= Chris Nickols =

Air Marshal Chris Nickols CB CBE DL FRAeS
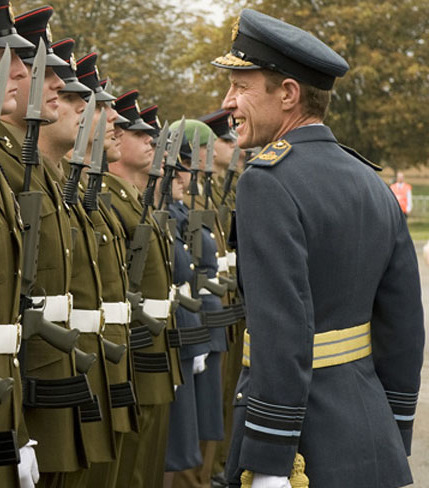
- Air Marshal Nickols inspects troops in 2010
- Born: 23 July 1956 (age 70)
- Military career
- Allegiance: United Kingdom
- Branch: Royal Air Force
- Service years: 1974–2012
- Rank: Air Marshal
- Commands: Air Warfare Centre; RAF Lossiemouth; No. 2 Squadron
- Conflicts: Kosovo War; Iraq War
- Awards: Companion of the Order of the Bath; Commander of the Order of the British Empire

Air Marshal Christopher Mark Nickols, CB, CBE, DL, FRAeS (born 23 July 1956) is a retired senior officer in the Royal Air Force, whose final appointment was Chief of Defence Intelligence. Prior to that he served as Assistant Chief of the Defence Staff (Operations).

== RAF career ==
Educated at St Edmund's School in Canterbury and having read engineering at Downing College, Cambridge, Nickols joined the Royal Air Force in 1974. He served as a pilot, flying Jaguars in Germany for 9 years before becoming Officer Commanding No. 2 Squadron in 1993. He was appointed Director of the UK Combined Air Operations Centre in 1997, Deputy Assistant Chief of Staff at Permanent Joint Headquarters at Northwood during the Kosovo War and then Station Commander at RAF Lossiemouth in 2000. He was also Air Commodore Offensive Operations at Headquarters No. 1 Group, and was Director of the Combined Air Operations Centre for four months in 2003 during the Iraq War. He was made Assistant Chief of the Defence Staff (Operations) in 2005 and Chief of Defence Intelligence in 2009.

Nickols is Chairman of the RAF Polo Association, and a Deputy Lieutenant of Kent.

Military offices
Preceded by Nick Houghton	Assistant Chief of the Defence Staff (Operations); 2005–2008	Succeeded by Andrew Pulford
Preceded by Stuart Peach	Chief of Defence Intelligence; 2009–2012	Succeeded by Alan Richards
