= Watson baronets =

Set index for Watson baronets

There have been seven baronetcies created for persons with the surname Watson, one in the Baronetage of England, one in the Baronetage of Great Britain and five in the Baronetage of the United Kingdom. As of 2026 one creation is extant.

- Watson baronets of Rockingham Castle (1623): see Marquess of Rockingham
- Watson baronets of Fulmer (1760)
- Watson, later Kay baronets, of East Sheen (1803): see Kay baronets
- Watson baronets of Henrietta Street (1866)
- Watson baronets of Earnock (1895)
- Watson baronets of Sulhamstead (1912)
- Watson baronets of Newport (1918)
