= David Richards, Baron Richards of Herstmonceux =

British general and Peer (born 1952)

Field Marshal The Right Honourable The Lord Richards of Herstmonceux GCB CBE DSO DL
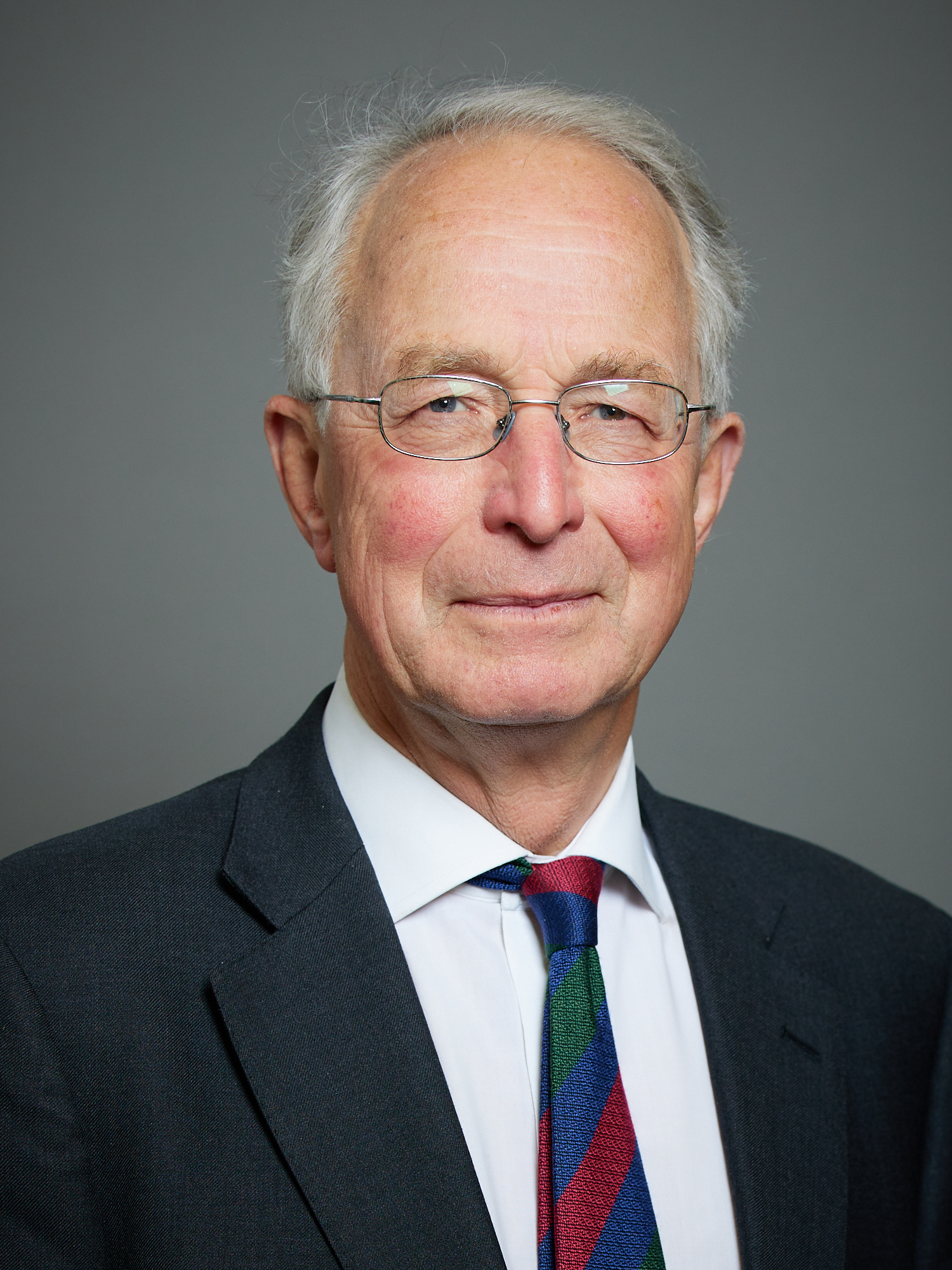
- Richards in 2022
- Born: 4 March 1952 (age 74); RAF Fayid, Kingdom of Egypt
- Military career
- Allegiance: United Kingdom
- Branch: British Army
- Service years: 1971–2013
- Rank: Field Marshal
- Service number: 491024
- Unit: Royal Artillery
- Commands: Chief of the Defence Staff; Chief of the General Staff; International Security Assistance Force; Allied Rapid Reaction Corps; 4th Armoured Brigade; 3rd Regiment Royal Horse Artillery
- Conflicts: The Troubles; International Force East Timor; Sierra Leone Civil War; War in Afghanistan
- Awards: Knight Grand Cross of the Order of the Bath; Commander of the Order of the British Empire; Companion of the Distinguished Service Order; Mentioned in Despatches; Commander of the Order of Rokel (Sierra Leone)
- Other work

Member of the House of Lords
- Lord Temporal
- Life peerage 24 February 2014

Personal details
- Party: Crossbencher

Field Marshal David Julian Richards, Baron Richards of Herstmonceux (born 4 March 1952), is a retired senior British Army officer and Peer who was formerly the Chief of the Defence Staff, the professional head of the British Armed Forces. He succeeded Air Chief Marshal Sir Jock Stirrup in this role on 29 October 2010.

Richards served in the Far East, Germany and Northern Ireland with the Royal Artillery before commanding forces in East Timor and most notably Sierra Leone, where his action without official sanctioning protected Freetown from rebel attacks during the Sierra Leone Civil War. Richards has also served with NATO as a major general, and as a lieutenant general he commanded the International Security Assistance Force in Afghanistan between 2006 and 2007 during its expansion across the whole country.

Richards became Commander-in-Chief, Land Forces of the British Army in 2008 and held this role until 2009 when he was appointed Chief of the General Staff, the head of the British Army. He was appointed as Chief of the Defence Staff the following year. He was succeeded by General Sir Nicholas Houghton on 18 July 2013.

In 2014, Richards was created a life peer taking the title Baron Richards of Herstmonceux. He currently sits in the House of Lords as a crossbencher. In December 2015, it was announced that he had joined the global advisory board of asset management firm CQS. He has also worked as an advisor to the government of the United Arab Emirates and US-based arms company DynCorp.

== Early life ==
Richards was born on 4 March 1952 to John Downie Richards and Pamela Mary Richards (née Reeves). Having been born at Fayid in Egypt where his father was an officer in the Royal Army Pay Corps, the family later moved to Devizes in Wiltshire and Cyprus before settling near Herstmonceux, East Sussex. He attended Eastbourne College, and was commissioned into the Royal Artillery as a second lieutenant in 1971. Posted to 29th Commando Regiment Royal Artillery, he passed the Commando course at the Commando Training Centre at Lympstone before deployment to Singapore. He then attended University College, Cardiff, graduating in 1974 with a degree in international relations.

== Army career ==
Richards served with the Royal Artillery in the Far East, Germany and the United Kingdom, including three tours in Northern Ireland, and served on the staff of the 11th Armoured Brigade in Germany. He was promoted lieutenant in 1974, and captain in 1977. He attended the Staff College, Camberley in 1984. Promoted to major that year, he returned to 11th Armoured Brigade to command a field battery in 47th Field Regiment. He then served as the Chief of Staff of the Berlin Brigade for two years, before being promoted lieutenant colonel on 30 June 1989. He served as an instructor at the Staff College for three years, and was then given command of the 3rd Regiment Royal Horse Artillery.

In 1994 Richards joined the Ministry of Defence as Colonel Army Plans. In December 1995, after completing the Higher Command and Staff course, he was promoted brigadier and then became Commander of the 4th Armoured Brigade in Germany. He became Chief of Joint Rapid Deployment Force Operations (soon shortened to Chief of Joint Force Operations) at the Permanent Joint Headquarters in March–April 1998. In this role, as the default commander for short notice expeditionary operations, he commanded the UK Contingent in East Timor as part of INTERFET in 1999 and twice commanded a UK Joint Task Force in Sierra Leone in 2000.

In 2000, during the Sierra Leone Civil War, Richards was in command of Operation Palliser, ostensibly to rescue British and other foreign nationals but which he then independently transformed into a commitment to support the embattled national president Ahmad Tejan Kabbah and lead the defence of his capital Freetown against the Revolutionary United Front. Although not initially sanctioned by London, the action was cited as a second example of the kind of liberal military intervention previously seen in Kosovo, and as such attributed to British Prime Minister Tony Blair.

In April 2001 Richards became Chief of Staff of NATO's Allied Rapid Reaction Corps, with the rank of major general. He became the British Assistant Chief of the General Staff in 2002, and on 19 January 2005 became the Commander of the Allied Rapid Reaction Corps, which carried promotion to lieutenant general.

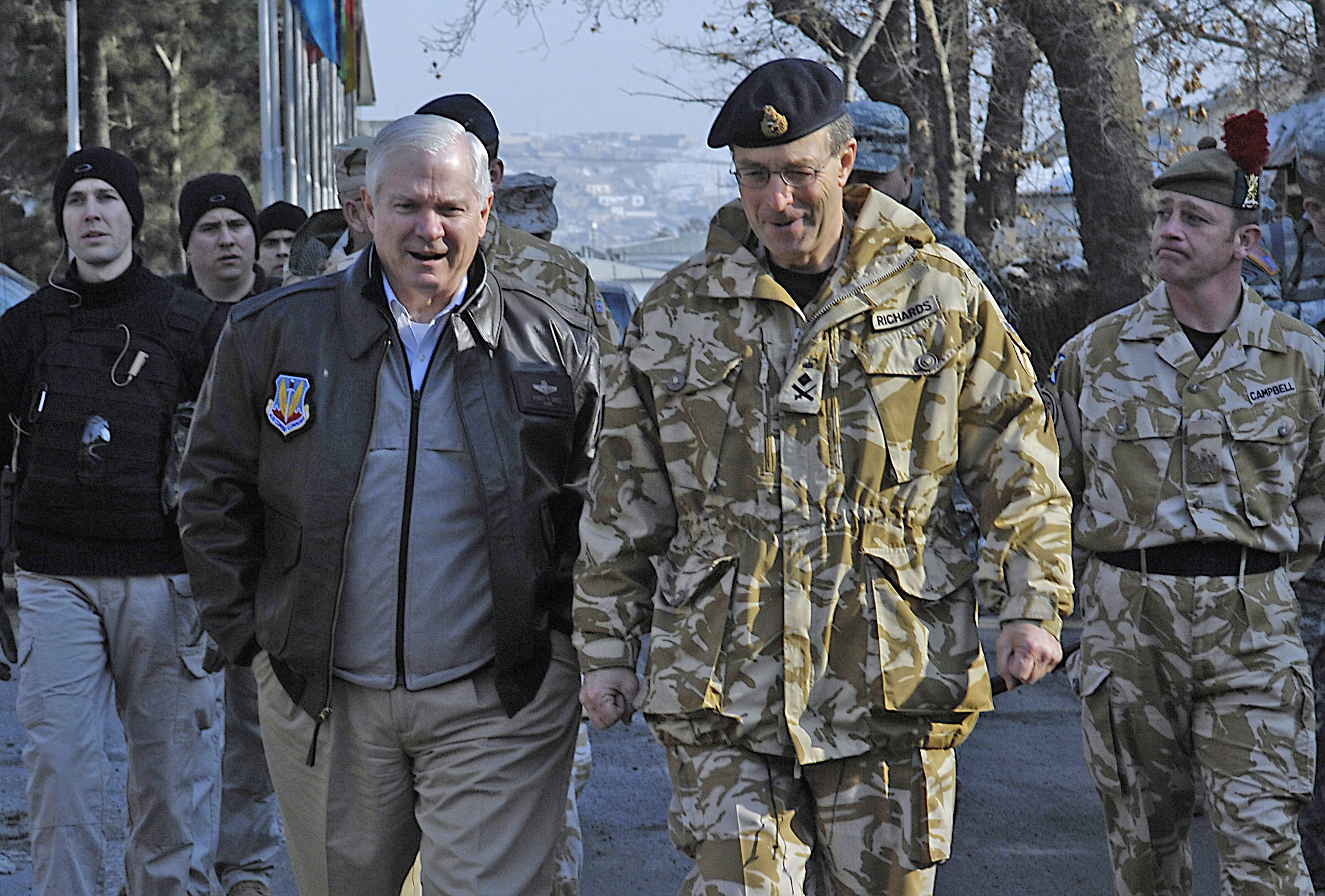
General Sir David Richards (right) during his tenure as ISAF commander, with U.S. Secretary of Defense Robert Gates in 2007

In July 2006, command of the international forces (the International Security Assistance Force) in southern Afghanistan was passed to NATO forces under Richards's command and he was promoted to the acting rank of full general (4-star). During his tenure, he oversaw the formation of a Policy Action Group to coordinate ISAF with President Hamid Karzai and the Afghan government, as well as establishing Afghan Development Zones to provide targeted developmental aid. On returning from Afghanistan in February 2007, he reverted to his previous rank of lieutenant general, and spent another year commanding the ARRC. On 1 February 2008 he was promoted to substantive General and appointed Commander-in-Chief, Land Forces in succession to General Sir Redmond Watt, and on 12 June 2008 he was appointed Aide-de-Camp General (ADC Gen) to The Queen.

== Chief of the Defence Staff (2009–2013) ==
On 17 October 2008, The Independent revealed Richards's appointment as the next Chief of the General Staff, the professional head of the Army. The Ministry of Defence later confirmed that he would take up the post in August 2009. In early August 2009, just before taking up his post, Richards was widely criticised when he claimed that British troops may have a role in Afghanistan for up to 40 years. General Sir Richard Dannatt handed over his appointment as Chief of the General Staff at midday on 28 August 2009 to Richards.

In February 2010, Richards said that a "turning point" had been reached in the battle against the Taliban. He suggested troop numbers could begin to decline as early as 2011 while the majority would be withdrawn by 2015. Richards said "we are now seeing some very optimistic signs" in the latest military offensive, Operation Moshtarak (togetherness), in Helmand. The Taliban had been forced to give "serious consideration" about continuing the fight. Richards said that: "We expect the military conflict to trail off in 2011," who was visiting British front-line forces for the first time since taking command of the Army last year. "The combat role will start to decline in 2011, but we will remain militarily engaged in training and support roles for another five years, and we will remain in a support role for many years to come."

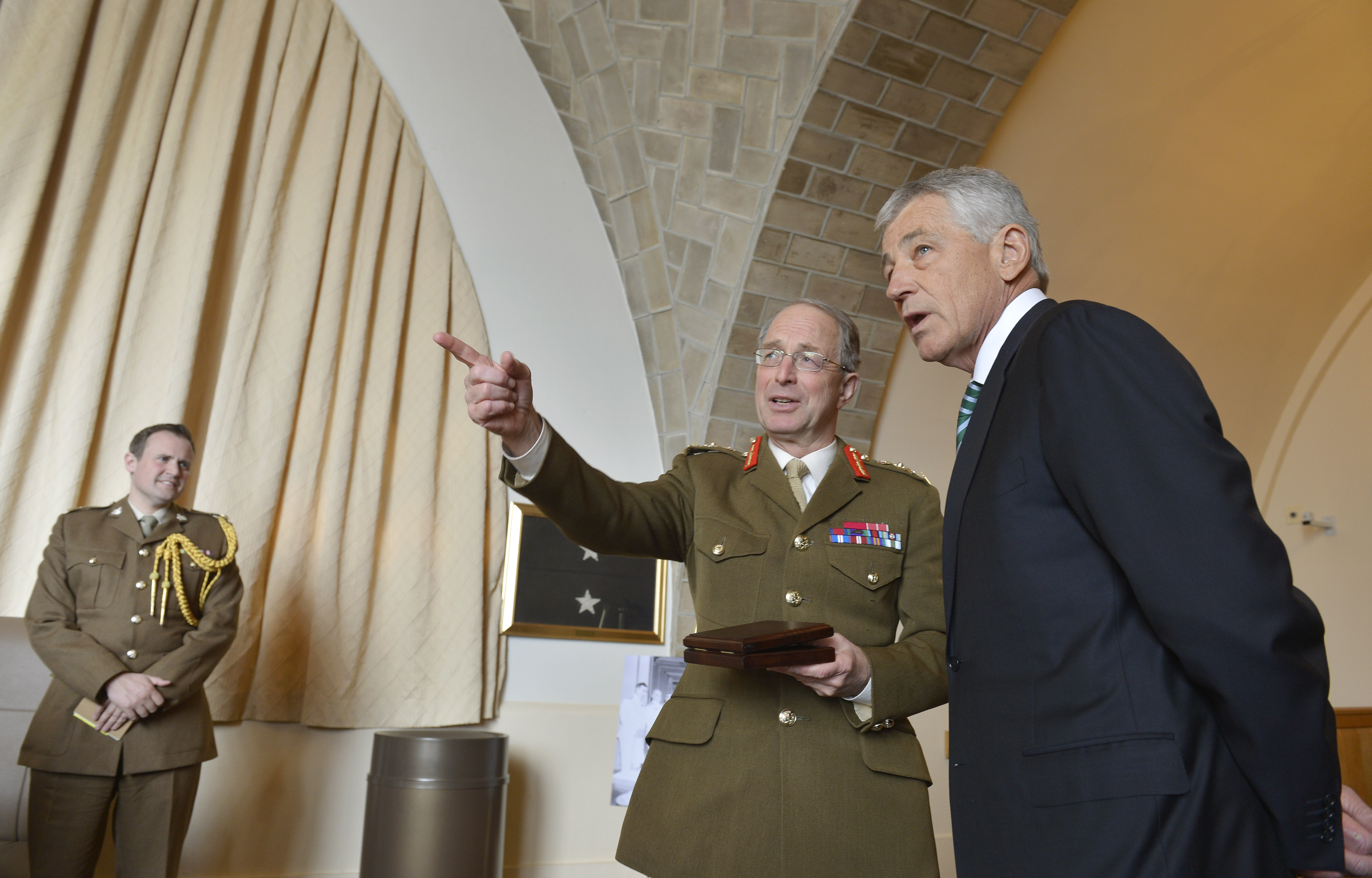
General Sir David Richards and Tom Tugendhat with U.S. Secretary of Defense Chuck Hagel in 2013

Richards said that "The Taliban is now beginning to realise that they can lose this war, which was not the view they had a year ago. We have to reinforce the view that they can, and will, be beaten." In 2010, however, he also stated in a radio interview that "I think there's no reason why we shouldn't be looking at [talking to the Taliban] pretty soon".

On 14 July 2010, the Ministry of Defence announced that in October 2010 Richards would become the next Chief of the Defence Staff in succession to Air Chief Marshal Sir Jock Stirrup. Downing Street, in a press statement to announce the intended ennoblement of Sir Jock, also announced in the same release that Sir David would take up his new post as Chief of the Defence Staff on Friday 29 October 2010, immediately after the retirement of Sir Jock.

In November 2010, Richards said there was no desire to "open up another front" in the Middle East but suggested that in future it "might be" necessary. David Cameron told Parliament that Britain would "take every step to cut out the terrorist cancer that lurks in the Arabian Peninsula", but Gen Richards said an intelligence-led approach was the current strategy. Richards added: "Clearly, the primary agencies dealing with this are our intelligence and security agencies. But the military are already helping with their [the Yemenis'] training. I don't think we want to open up another front there and nor do the Yemenis want us to do that. So we have to find other ways of doing these things and in the meantime making sure Afghanistan doesn't revert to becoming, if you like, a 'second Yemen' – that is the Army's primary duty at the moment. Our role is to remain very close to them, to help them where they most need it and in the meanwhile focus our efforts on Afghanistan and assisting Pakistan to ensure they don't become the threat Yemen is beginning to be.

In May 2011, Richards and other senior NATO officers expressed a wish for backing from member states to intensify the war effort in Libya by directly targeting Col Gaddafi's regime, rather than simply protecting Libyan civilians. "The military campaign to date has been a significant success for NATO and our Arab allies, but we need to do more. If we do not up the ante now there is a risk that the conflict could result in Gaddafi clinging to power," said Gen Richards. He added that, while NATO forces were not targeting Col Gaddafi directly, he could nevertheless become a legitimate target if he was caught directly attacks against Libyan civilians. "The United Nations resolution allows Nato to use 'all necessary means' in Libya," he said. "We are not targeting Gaddafi directly, but if it happened that he was in a command and control centre that was hit by Nato and he was killed, then that is within the rules."

During the Syrian Civil War, Richards drew up plans to train and equip a Syrian rebel army of 100,000 to overthrow President Bashar al-Assad, as an alternative option to the government's plan for limited direct military involvement. The plans were rejected by the National Security Council as too ambitious. Consequently, his alternative advice was "to let Assad win and quickly and to stop encouraging and supplying opposition groups with insufficient support to ensure their success" to reduce the humanitarian consequences, which was not accepted. Ultimately on 29 August 2013, parliament refused to support the government's plan to participate in military strikes against the Syrian government.

Richards was succeeded as Chief of the Defence Staff by General Sir Nicholas Houghton on 18 July 2013.

== Later life ==
Richards worked as a consultant for the government of the United Arab Emirates and has advised American arms company DynCorp.

From October 2013, Richards has worked as a Senior Adviser to the International Institute for Strategic Studies.

Richards is a patron of the Armed Forces Muslim Association.

On 26 June 2014, Richards said that Britain's Armed Forces will be like a "banana republic" if the Ministry of Defence kept cutting costs, and criticised the "bean counters" who cut perks for his successors. He is believed to have said Defence Secretary Philip Hammond "would never be a good soldier". Richards was concerned about a controversial plan to replace regular troops with reservists. On pay to soldiers, he said:

But because we look after them and because it's socially at every level acceptable to be in the Army, whether you're a private in the Green Howards from Yorkshire or the heir to the throne and you are a captain in some smart organisation, the fact is there is a consensus that it's a good to be in the armed forces. If you lose that, because you don’t look after your people well, you will have an army, a navy and an air force, but it will be the sort of army, navy and air force with which we don’t associate with the British, that you associate with banana republics ultimately. We have outstanding people and we need to look after them.

On 7 October 2014, Richards criticised the contemporary Western strategy employed to defeat ISIS. He said that air strikes are:

...never going to be sufficient. The trouble is that once they get into built-up areas it's very difficult for air power alone to dislodge them and obviously all our air forces take a lot of trouble about not causing civilian casualties.

Richards wrote an autobiography, Taking Command, which was published by Headline in October 2014.

In a November 2016 interview with the parliamentary magazine The House, Richards said of Western involvement in the Syrian Civil War:

If the humanitarian situation in Syria is our major concern, which it should be – millions of lives have been ruined, hundreds of thousands have been killed – I believe there is a strong case for allowing Assad to get in there and take the city back.

The alternative is for the West to declare a no-fly zone and that means you’ve got to be prepared to go to war with Russia ultimately. I see no appetite for that and nor, frankly, do I see much sense in it. It sticks in my throat to say it because I have no love for Assad.

The fact is, the only way to get it to stop now is to allow Assad to win and win quickly and then turn on Isis with the Russians.

In June 2022, Richards made similar criticisms of the West's incrementally developed approach to the 2022 Russian invasion of Ukraine. He suggested the long-term strategy should be to persuade Russia not to align with China.

Richards was promoted to the honorary rank of field marshal in June 2025.

== Honours ==
Richards attended the US Brigade Commanders, Combined Joint Force Land Component Commanders, and Joint Task Force Commanders (Pinnacle) Courses. His operational awards include a Mention in Despatches for services in Northern Ireland. Richards was appointed a Commander of the Order of the British Empire (CBE) for services in East Timor, and made a Companion of the Distinguished Service Order (DSO) for services in Sierra Leone (Operation Barras).

Richards was appointed and knighted as a Knight Commander of the Order of the Bath (KCB) in the July 2007 operational and gallantry awards list for his services in Afghanistan. In 2014, he was made a Commander of the Order of the Rokel, Sierra Leone's highest honour, for "gallant leadership of the British Military intervention in the Sierra Leone Civil War."

Richards was appointed Honorary Colonel of the Royal Rifle Volunteers on 1 September 2003, Colonel Commandant of the Royal Artillery on 19 January 2005, and on 1 April 2007 he was appointed Colonel Commandant of the Brigade of Gurkhas. Richards was advanced to Knight Grand Cross of the Order of the Bath (GCB) in the 2011 New Years Honours.

Richards was created a life peer on 24 February 2014 taking the title Baron Richards of Herstmonceux, of Emsworth in the County of Hampshire. He was chosen to carry the Sword of Spiritual Justice at the Coronation of Charles III.

On 14 June 2025, Richards, alongside his successor, The Lord Houghton of Richmond, was promoted honorary Field Marshal in the British Army.

== Personal life ==
In 1978 Richards married Caroline Reyne (née Bond). Lady Richards of Herstmonceux is a trustee of charities Plant for Peace and The Afghan Appeal. They have two daughters, Joanna and Pippa.

Richards is a keen student of military history and a qualified offshore yachtsman. He is Admiral of the British Kiel Yacht Club and Royal Artillery Yacht Club.

== Honours and awards ==
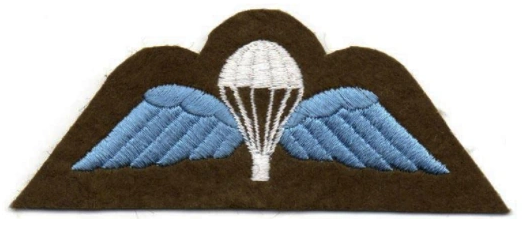

Ribbon	Description	Notes
	Knight Grand Cross of the Order of the Bath	Appointed in 2011
	Commander of the Order of the British Empire	Appointed in 2000
	Companion of the Distinguished Service Order	Appointed in 2001
	General Service Medal (1962)	Mentioned in Despatches
	Operational Service Medal for Sierra Leone	
	Operational Service Medal for Afghanistan	
	Queen Elizabeth II Golden Jubilee Medal	
	Queen Elizabeth II Diamond Jubilee Medal	
	Queen Elizabeth II Platinum Jubilee Medal	
	King Charles III Coronation Medal	
	Accumulated Campaign Service Medal	
	International Force East Timor Medal	
	Commander of the Order of Rokel	From Sierra Leone; Awarded in 2014

== Bibliography ==
- "[Untitled book review]". Book Reviews. Naval War College Review. 71 (3): 150–152. Summer 2018. Review of Ullman, Harlan (2017). Anatomy of failure : why America loses every war it starts. Annapolis: Naval Institute Press.
- Richards, David (2014), Taking Command. The Autobiography, Headline ISBN 978-1-4722-2084-4

Military offices
Preceded by Richard Dannatt	Assistant Chief of the General Staff; 2002–2005	Succeeded by Bill Rollo
Preceded by Sir Richard Dannatt	Commander Allied Rapid Reaction Corps; 2005–2007	Succeeded by Sir Richard Shirreff
Preceded by Mauro del Vecchio	Commander, International Security Assistance Force; 2006–2007	Succeeded by Dan K. McNeill
Preceded by Sir Redmond Watt	Commander-in-Chief, Land Forces; 2008–2009	Succeeded by Sir Peter Wall
Preceded by Sir Richard Dannatt	Chief of the General Staff; 2009–2010	Succeeded by Sir Peter Wall
Preceded by Sir Jock Stirrup	Chief of the Defence Staff; 2010–2013	Succeeded by Sir Nick Houghton
Orders of precedence in the United Kingdom
Preceded by The Lord Thomas of Cwmgiedd	Gentlemen; Baron Richards of Herstmonceux	Followed by The Lord Farmer
