= Air and Space Warfare Centre =

Air Space Warfare Centre at RAF Waddington, Lincolnshire, England

- Unit badge
- Active: October 1993 – present
- Country: United Kingdom
- Branch: Royal Air Force
- Type: Research, development and integrated mission support organisation
- Part of: No. 1 Group
- Headquarters: RAF Waddington
- Mottos: Arma judicare consilium dare (Latin for 'To test the weaponry and give advice')

Commanders
- Current commander: Air Commodore Steven Berry

The Air and Space Warfare Centre (ASWC) is a Royal Air Force research and testing organisation based at RAF Waddington in Lincolnshire. It has a training branch nearby as a lodger unit of RAF Cranwell and other branches elsewhere, including at RAF High Wycombe, RAF Brize Norton, MoD Boscombe Down, and RAF Odiham.

== History ==
The Air Warfare Centre was established in October 1993 and serves RAF Air Command by developing and implementing operational-level and tactical-level air doctrine. In early 2020, the organisation was renamed to the Air and Space Warfare Centre to better reflect the RAF's increasing involvement in the space domain. Additionally, the Air and Space Warfare Centre HQ hosts to the Strategic Command Joint Electronic Warfare Operational Support Centre (JEWOSC), which contributes to the operational capability of the three British armed forces by providing Electronic Warfare support directly to the Permanent Joint Headquarters in Northwood and to various operational units.

During 1993 it was parent to:

- Central Trials & Tasks Organisation at RAF Boscombe Down
- Department of Air Warfare at RAF Cranwell
- Strike Attack Operational Evaluation Unit at RAF Boscombe Down
- Tornado F.3 Operational Evaluation Unit at RAF Coningsby
- Long-Range Maritime Patrol Cell at Northwood Headquarters
- Operational Research Branch at RAF High Wycombe
- Support Helicopter Trials & Tactics Flight at RAF Odiham
- Electronic Warfare Operational Support Establishment at RAF Wyton
- Air Defence Ground Environment Operational Evaluation Unit at RAF Ash

On 4 September 1995, the Thomson building opened to house the centre.

The Air and Space Warfare Centre (ASWC) Mission is to contribute to the military capability of Air Command by developing and implementing operational and tactical doctrine and providing essential and timely integrated mission support to RAF operational units in peace and in war.

== Structure ==
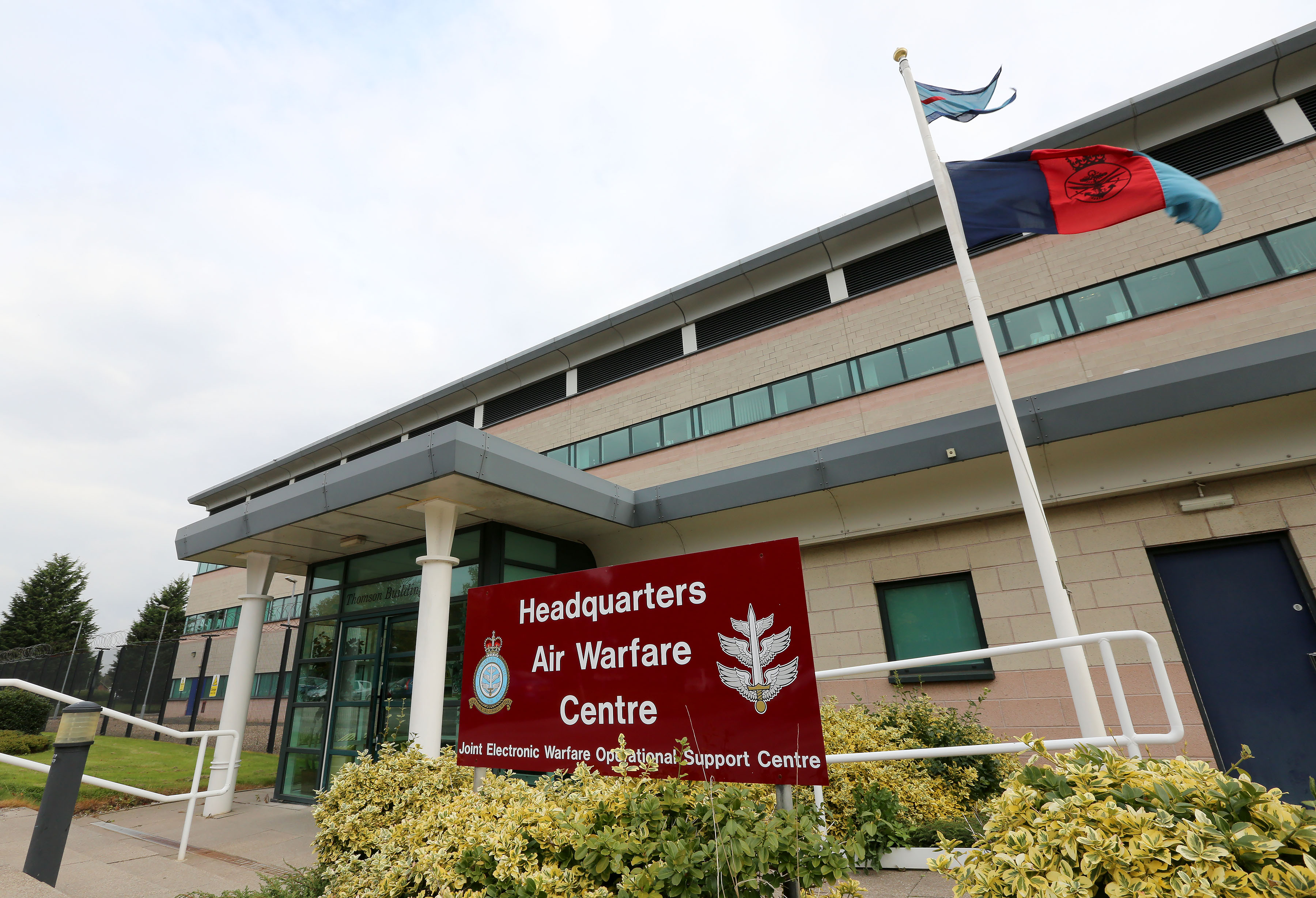
The Thomson Building at RAF Waddington, headquarters of the Air and Space Warfare Centre.

Based at RAF Waddington, and eleven other locations throughout the UK, the primary mission of the ASWC is the provision of timely integrated mission support to the front line. The Defence Electronic Warfare Centre is an integral part and is jointly staffed by Royal Navy, Army, RAF and civilian personnel. Operational level Doctrine and Development (D&D) issues are addressed as part of the remit of the Doctrine and Collective Training staff of the Operations Division, in addition to their responsibilities for providing (in conjunction with the Liaison Officers from the Royal Navy, Army and United States Air Force) operational support to air and joint headquarters and training tasks. The great majority of the remainder of ASWC personnel provide: tactical level mission support in the form of production and maintenance of the Defence Electronic Warfare Database; Electronic Warfare Operational Support (EWOS) for all aircraft, ships and some Army units; operational evaluation of all aircraft types, associated equipment and weapons through the various Test and Evaluation Squadrons; administration and instruction of all joint air warfare courses. Scientific support to all ASWC activities is provided by the Operational Analysis staff. There are 6 separate, albeit integrated, areas of responsibility as follows:

== Development Division ==
Development Division is responsible for de-risking the future of airpower, both in conceptual terms and in practical terms: it is also responsible for shaping, and preparing for, the Test and Evaluation (T&E) of new capabilities to the Air environment.

== Operations Division ==
Operations Division co-ordinates and provides Integrated Mission Support (IMS) for operations, training and trials. Included in the Division's responsibilities are the development, dissemination and teaching of Air Environmental Doctrine, Air Warfare Training and the co-ordination of Synthetic Command and Control Training as well as wargaming, developing air tactics and weaponeering (92 Sqn). Operations Division is responsible for the development of Air Command and Control capability through workshop, study and experimentation. In addition, it provides Tactical Leadership and Combined Qualified Weapons Instructor training, and it co-ordinates the activities of the Command and Battlespace Management (Air) Working Group. Within Operations Division, the Information Operations Group is responsible for Operational Security (OPSEC) training and the integration of kinetic and non-kinetic effects within collective training exercises.

== Integrated Mission Support ==
The Integrated Mission Support (IMS) cell was formally opened on 1 July 2013 by the AWC Commandant. The purpose of the IMS Cell is to support the AWC activity by enabling collaborative working, assuring output, and gathering feedback from the war-fighter to refine the future process through a continuous improvement ethos. The Integrated Mission Support process combines subject matter expertise across the ASWC to deliver timely, impartial and authoritative advice to meet the needs of the Customer. RAF personnel in the cell are drawn from several backgrounds.

The purpose of the IMS Cell is to support the AWC activity by enabling collaborative working, assuring output, and gathering feedback from the war-fighter to refine the future process through a continuous improvement ethos. The Integrated Mission Support process combines subject matter expertise across the ASWC to deliver timely, impartial and authoritative advice to meet the needs of the Customer.

The IMS Cell is the center cog in a much larger machine. IMS has "Champions" throughout the ASWC. When an IMS task comes in the IMS Cell ratifies the enquiry, then distributes it to the "Champions". The "Champions" then return their input to a final product, whether that is a Document, PowerPoint or Brief, IMS then assure the product to ensure the original enquiry has been answered. The final product is then distributed to the customer.

== Operations Support Division ==
Operations Support Division provides timely, fused, all-source operational air intelligence support and intelligence planning. It acts as the focus for targeting issues and supports the ASWC's Integrated Mission Support responsibilities. It is responsible for the management of the Defence Electronic Warfare Centre and specifically for the maintenance and segmental development of the database, as well as the provision of associated data and information to all 3 Services, including the provision of the national Electronic Order of Battle. The Division encompasses 591 Signals Unit, 7006(VR) Squadron, 7010(VR) Squadron and 7630(VR) Squadron RAuxAF and is Operational Sponsor for the Operations Support (Intelligence) Specialisation and Intelligence Analyst (Intelligence) Trade.

== Operational Analysis (OA) Element ==
The Operational Analysis Element supports all the divisions of the AWC. It conducts studies and provides scientific and technical advice on any issue which affects the conduct of air operations. It plans, directs and manages activities to meet the scientific studies and advice requirements of Air Command. The work includes the support of test and evaluation of aircraft, weapons (air-to-air, air-to-surface and surface-to-air), countermeasures and associated systems involving the design, management, analysis and reporting of flight and ground trials. Direct support of front line operations comprises advice to HQs and tactical advice to squadrons including targeting (weapon to target matching and collateral damage modelling) and threat assessment. Higher level analysis tasks include information and influence operations, psychological effects studies and campaign effectiveness assessment.

== Flying Division ==
Flying Division is responsible for integrating air power expertise with test, evaluation, tactical-development and operational-employment activities, in order to deliver capability in support of current operations, while developing capabilities to meet requirements of the future. To achieve this, it conducts flight and ground tests to assess, develop, evaluate, and clear aircraft for the front line, together with airborne weapons and sensors. As well as trialling new or modified systems and software in order to ensure they are safe and effective, Flying Division also ensures they are delivered with mature tactics ready for operational deployment. It also conducts developmental and research flying. Flying Division is supported by, and delivers its activities through, 206 Sqn, the tri-service Rotary Wing Test and Evaluation Squadron (RWTES) and the Empire Test Pilot School (ETPS) at MOD Boscombe Down, and 17 TES and 41 Sqn at RAF Coningsby. Much of its activity at Boscombe Down is conducted in partnership with the defence science and technology company, QinetiQ, as part of the Air Test & Evaluation Centre (ATEC). The Heavy Aircraft Test Squadron was formerly responsible for testing heavy aircraft.

== Test and Evaluation Division ==
T&E Division are responsible for the Joint Airborne Delivery T&E Unit, 56 Test & Evaluation Squadron, the 216 Unmanned Aerial Systems T&E Squadron, the trials coordination cell and all military personnel employed as fixed/rotary-wing mission systems / air-launched munitions specialists who directly support Air T&E activity. This division are also the prime interface between the AWC, QinetiQ and the Ministry of Defence T&E Simulation and Training Project Team, providing a focus for MOD programmes at Boscombe Down supported under the Long Term Partnering Agreement. The T&E Division is commanded by the AWC's principal engineer and is responsible to the Commandant AWC for all professional engineering matters.

== Joint Air Delivery Test and Evaluation Unit ==
The JADTEU mission is "To enable the delivery by air of manpower, machines and materiel through development, trials and training, in order to enhance Defence Capability."

The unit is located at RAF Brize Norton and comprises 124 [Royal Navy, Army, Royal Air Force and Civil Service] personnel commanded by a lieutenant colonel.

== Commandants ==
- Air Commodore John Lumsden 1993–1996
- Air Commodore R V Morris 1996–1998
- Air Commodore Ray Horwood 1998–2000
- Air Commodore Stuart Peach 2000–2003
- Air Commodore Chris Nickols 2003–2005
- Air Commodore Tim Anderson 2005–2007
- Air Commodore Julian Stinton 2007–2009
- Air Commodore Edward Stringer 2009–2011
- Air Commodore Stu Evans 2011–2013
- Air Commodore Bruce Hedley 2013–2015
- Air Commodore Alistair Seymour 2015–2019
- Air Commodore Richard Davies 2019–2022
- Air Commodore Blythe Crawford 2022–2025
- Air Commodore Steven Berry 2025-Present

== See also ==
- List of Royal Air Force units & establishments

== Citations ==
=== Bibliography ===
- March, Peter R. (1996). Royal Air Force Yearbook 1996. Fairford, UK: Royal Air Force Benevolent Fund.
- Sturtivant, Ray; Hamlin, John; Halley, James J. (1997). Royal Air Force flying training and support units. UK: Air-Britain (Historians). ISBN 0-85130-252-1.
