= Gordon Messenger =

Retired British Royal Marines general (born 1962)

General Sir Gordon Messenger KCB DSO & Bar OBE
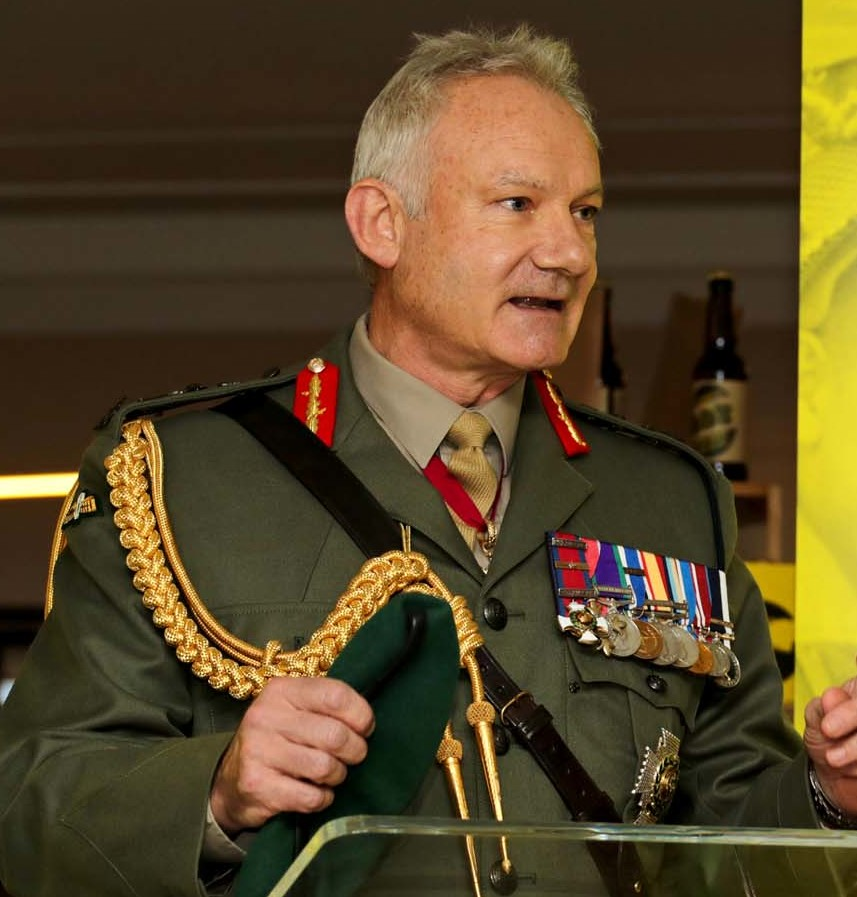
- General Messenger in 2019
- Born: 15 April 1962 (age 64); Dundee, Scotland
- Military career
- Allegiance: United Kingdom
- Branch: Royal Marines
- Service years: 1983–2019
- Rank: General
- Commands: Vice-Chief of the Defence Staff (2016–19); Task Force Helmand (2008–09); 3 Commando Brigade (2008–09); 40 Commando (2002–04)
- Conflicts: War in Afghanistan; Iraq War
- Awards: Knight Commander of the Order of the Bath; Companion of the Distinguished Service Order & Bar; Officer of the Order of the British Empire
- Other work: Rear-Admiral of the United Kingdom (2021–present); Constable of the Tower of London (2022–present); Lord High Steward (6 May 2023)

General Sir Gordon Kenneth Messenger, KCB, DSO & Bar, OBE (born 15 April 1962) is a retired senior Royal Marines officer who served as Vice-Chief of the Defence Staff from May 2016 to May 2019. As a colonel he commanded 40 Commando during the Iraq War, and led the Commando in the assault on the Al-Faw Peninsula. He served as British Commander of Task Force Helmand, during the 3 Commando Brigade deployment to Helmand Province, Afghanistan on Operation Herrick IX from 2008 to 2009. After his retirement, Messenger has held ceremonial positions, including Lord High Steward at the coronation of King Charles III in 2023.

== Early life and education ==
Messenger was born on 15 April 1962 in Dundee, Scotland. He was educated at King Edward VI School, Southampton, then an all-boys school. He studied geography at the University of Leicester, graduating with a Bachelor of Science degree in 1983.

== Military career ==
On 15 September 1983, Messenger was appointed an acting lieutenant on a short career graduate commission, (with seniority from 1 September 1982), transferring to a full career commission on 21 May 1986 with seniority from 1 September 1984. At this time he also qualified as a Mountain Leader. In 1995 he graduated from the Canadian Forces Command and Staff Course No 21. He was promoted substantive major on 30 June 1997, having previously held the rank locally.

Messenger served with British forces in the former Yugoslavia in 2000 (Kosovo), for which he was appointed Officer of the Order of the British Empire (OBE). In 2001 he took command of 40 Commando. He was promoted substantive colonel on 30 June 2002, having previously held the rank on an acting basis. For his leadership of 40 Commando (and attached army units) in Iraq, including the initial assault on Al Faw peninsular, and an action against Iraqi armour at Abu Al Khasib, he was appointed a Companion of the Distinguished Service Order (DSO) on 31 October 2003. After a sabbatical in Geneva, he joined the Joint Force Headquarters as Chief of Staff in July 2004, a job that saw him on various operations worldwide, including Operation Garron, the 2004 tsunami relief effort, Operation Highbrow, the Lebanon evacuation operation, and a six-month tour in command of the Operation Herrick preliminary operation in Afghanistan. He graduated from the UK Higher Command and Staff Course in 2007 and was promoted brigadier on 24 April 2007. On 1 April 2008 he was appointed an aide-de-camp to the Queen.

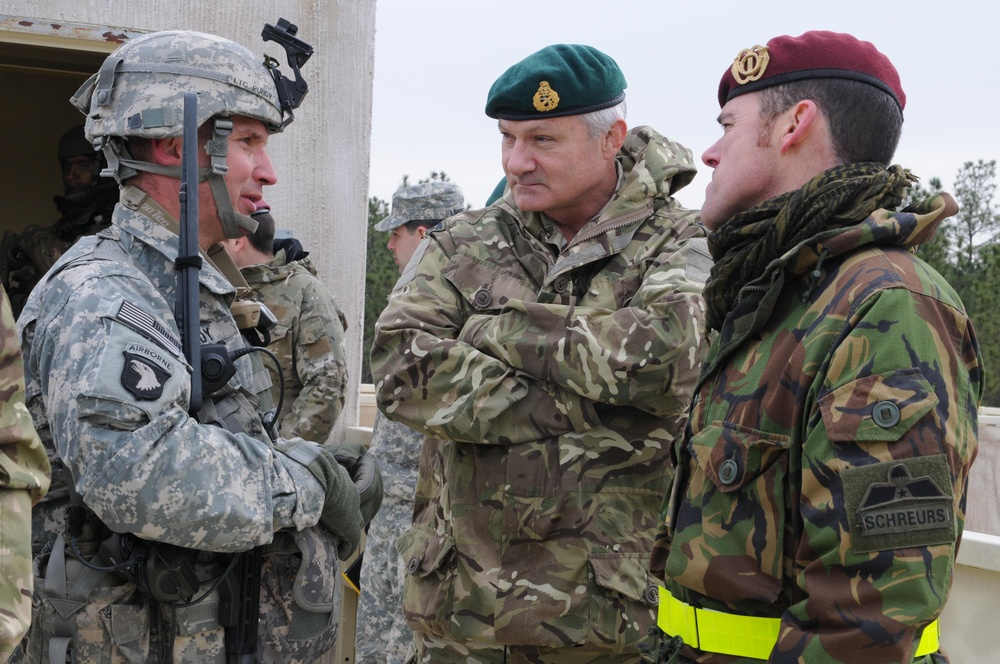
Lt. Gen. Messenger during a NATO exercise in 2014

Messenger served as the British Commander of Task Force Helmand, during the 3 Commando Brigade deployment to Helmand Province, Afghanistan on Operation Herrick IX in 2008–2009. For his leadership during this operation he was awarded a Bar to his DSO on 11 September 2009, the first member of the Naval Service to receive the DSO and Bar for over 50 years. He was promoted major general in late 2009, and appointed lead spokesman on British operations in Afghanistan. He went on to be Chief of Staff (Operations) at Permanent Joint Headquarters, Northwood in 2011 and became Director Force Reintegration HQ International Security Assistance Force in October 2012. He served as Deputy Commander of NATO Allied Land Command (LANDCOM)-Izmir from January 2013 until June 2014 when he was assigned to the post of Deputy Chief of the Defence Staff (Operations) in the Ministry of Defence. He was promoted to lieutenant general on 14 January 2013.

On 1 December 2015, Messenger appeared in front of the Defence Select Committee of the House of Commons in relation to the military situation in Syria. On 15 March 2016, he was in South Korea to observe British troops participating in Operation Key Resolve. Messenger handed over his role of Deputy Chief of the Defence Staff (Operations) to Lieutenant General Mark Carleton-Smith on 18 April 2016. He was appointed as Vice Chief of the Defence Staff in spring 2016, in succession to Air Chief Marshal Stuart Peach. Messenger was formally promoted to full general on 16 May 2016. He is the first four-star Royal Marine general since 1977.

Messenger was appointed a Companion of the Order of the Bath in the 2015 Birthday Honours, and a Knight Commander of the Order of the Bath in the 2016 Birthday Honours. He is patron of the Defence Medical Welfare Service, and honorary Colonel of 131 Commando Squadron Royal Engineers.

Messenger retired from the Royal Marines in May 2019. On 6 December 2021 Messenger was appointed Rear-Admiral of the United Kingdom, the first time that a Royal Marine has held the role.

== Later life ==
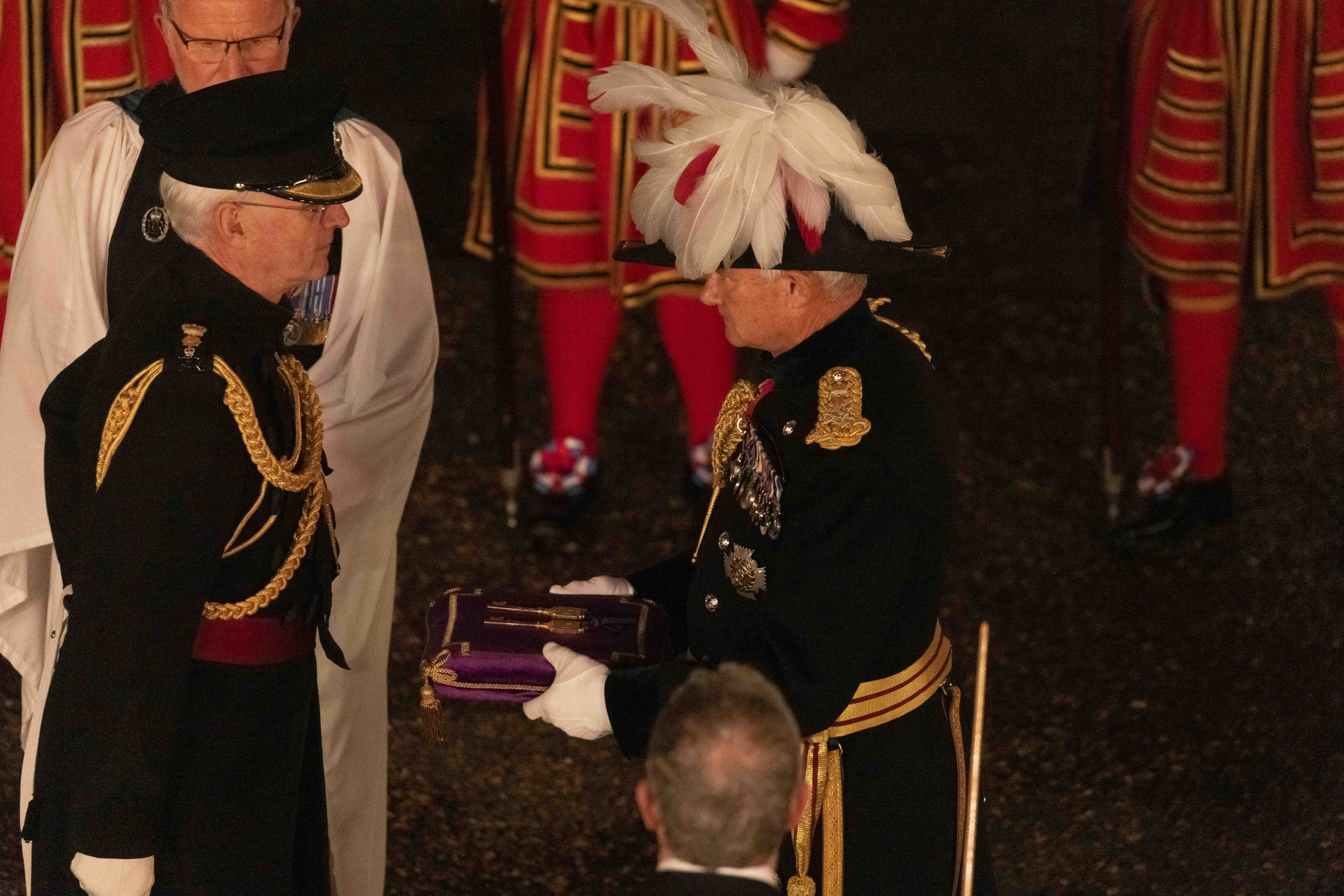
Messenger receiving The Monarch's Keys from the Comptroller of the Lord Chamberlain's Office during his installation as Constable

In April 2022, it was announced that he had been appointed Constable of the Tower of London. He took up the post on 1 August 2022, and is the first Royal Marine to hold the post. On 5 October 2022, he was officially installed as the 161st Constable of the Tower during a service at the Tower of London.

Messenger served as Lord High Steward at the coronation of King Charles III and Queen Camilla in 2023. He carried St Edward's Crown in the Royal procession.

=== Messenger review ===
Messenger was appointed in October 2021 to lead a review of leadership in the English NHS. The review considered the "pay and incentives" offered to the service's most senior figures, as well as the "effective systems for intervention and recovery in both providers and integrated care systems", and was to report by May 2022. The King's Fund produced a timeline of recent major NHS reviews, most of which had little impact. Sajid Javid welcomed the report saying: "The findings in this report are stark, it shows examples of great leadership but also where we need to urgently improve," but according to the Health Service Journal it was full of well-meaning and often well-judged sentiments – but the recommendations were either peripheral or so vague as to be virtually worthless with the only significant recommendation being the introduction of a single set of "core leadership and management standards". It also overlapped with the review of the application of the Fit-and-proper-person test to the NHS. The Daily Telegraph said the review addressed "none of the issues that affect the great majority of people, or at least not directly", and that it also contained contradictory positions on diversity, inclusion and bullying. It was also pointed out that – by any reasonable definition – the NHS has "far too few managers" with low spending on administration and planning compared to other healthcare systems.

== Family ==
Messenger is married to Sarah and they have three children. He enjoys running, rugby, rock climbing, golf, gardening and real ale.

Military offices
| Preceded by James Everard | Deputy Chief of the Defence Staff (Operations); 2014–2016 | Succeeded by Mark Carleton-Smith |
| Preceded by Sir Stuart Peach | Vice-Chief of the Defence Staff; 2016–2019 | Succeeded by Tim Fraser |
Honorary titles
| Preceded by Sir Kenneth Eaton | Rear-Admiral of the United Kingdom; 2021–present | Incumbent |
| Preceded by Lord Houghton of Richmond | Constable of the Tower of London; 2022–present | Incumbent |
Court offices
| Vacant Title last held by The Viscount Cunningham of Hyndhope | Lord High Steward; 2023 | Vacant |
