= David Capewell =

Royal Marines Lieutenant General (born 1959)

Lieutenant General Sir David Capewell KCB OBE
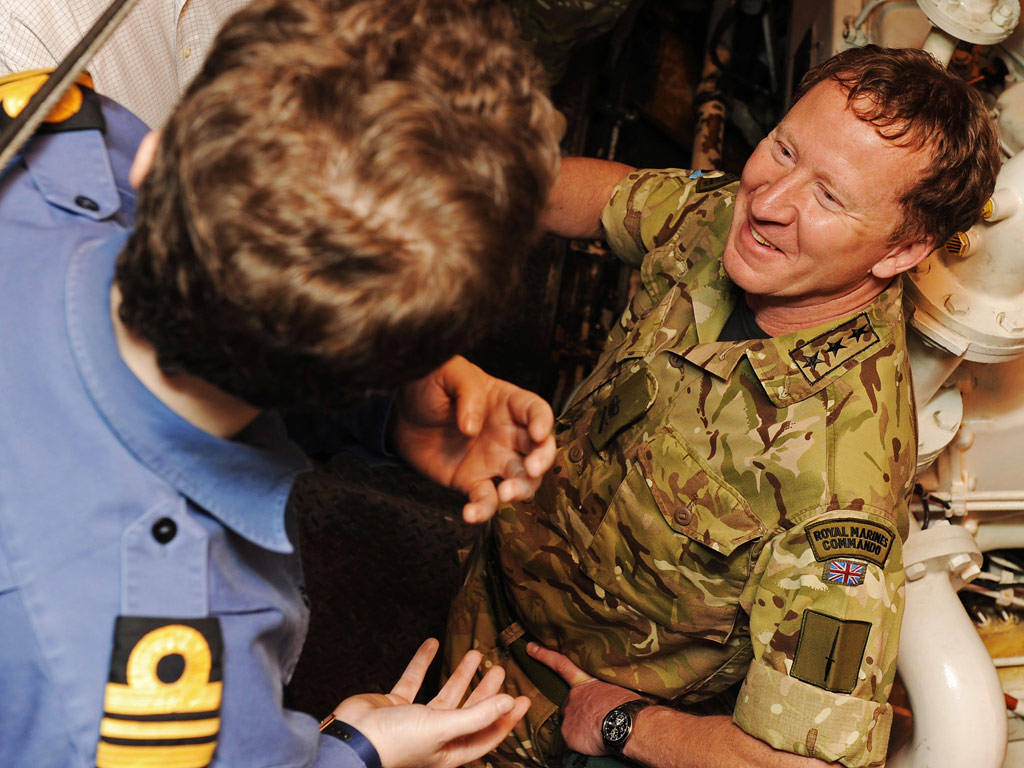
- Lieutenant General Capewell (right) in 2013
- Born: 21 August 1959 (age 67)
- Military career
- Allegiance: United Kingdom
- Branch: Royal Marines
- Service years: 1979–2016
- Rank: Lieutenant General
- Commands: Chief of Joint Operations; 3 Commando Brigade; 40 Commando
- Conflicts: Operation Banner; International Force for East Timor; War in Afghanistan; Iraq War
- Awards: Knight Commander of the Order of the Bath; Officer of the Order of the British Empire

Lieutenant General Sir David Andrew Capewell, KCB, OBE (born 21 August 1959) is a retired Royal Marines officer who served as Chief of Joint Operations from 2011 to 2015.

== Early life and education ==
Capewell was born on 21 August 1959 in Huddersfield, Yorkshire, England. He was educated at Holme Valley Grammar School, a grammar school in Holme Valley, Yorkshire.

== Military career ==
Capewell was commissioned into the Royal Marines in 1979, holding a special short-service commission. He was confirmed in the rank of lieutenant on 1 September 1983 (seniority from 1 February), and was transferred to a full career commission on 29 October 1985 (seniority from 1 February 1983).

As a junior officer, Capewell served in Northern Ireland, Zimbabwe and South Africa. He was promoted to major on 31 December 1994. He became chief of staff of 3 Commando Brigade in 1998. He was promoted to colonel on 31 December 1999 and appointed commanding officer of 40 Commando in March 2000. In January 2002, he was appointed chief of staff, UK Joint Force Headquarters, in which role he served as chief of operations and intelligence to the British commander for the invasion of Iraq. He was appointed an Officer of the Order of the British Empire in the 2002 Birthday Honours for service in Northern Ireland and Afghanistan.

Capewell went on to be British liaison officer to the Joint Chiefs of Staff in the United States in 2004, and was promoted to brigadier on 18 October 2004. He became assistant chief of staff (Operations) at Permanent Joint Headquarters in May 2005 and commander of 3 Commando Brigade in June 2007. Promoted to major general on 6 May 2008, on his appointment as Deputy Commander NATO Rapid Deployable Italian Corps, he became Assistant Chief of the Defence Staff (Operations) at the Ministry of Defence in August 2010 and Chief of Joint Operations at Permanent Joint Headquarters in December 2011, with the rank of lieutenant general from 13 December.

Capewell was appointed Knight Commander of the Order of the Bath in the 2014 New Year Honours for commanding UK Global Operations during a period of unprecedented volatility.

== Family ==
Capewell is married to Deborah and has two daughters.

Military offices
Preceded by Sir Stuart Peach	Chief of Joint Operations; 2011–2015	Succeeded by John Lorimer
