= Glenn Torpy =

Royal Air Force Air Chief Marshal (born 1953)

Air Chief Marshal Sir Glenn Torpy GCB CBE DSO
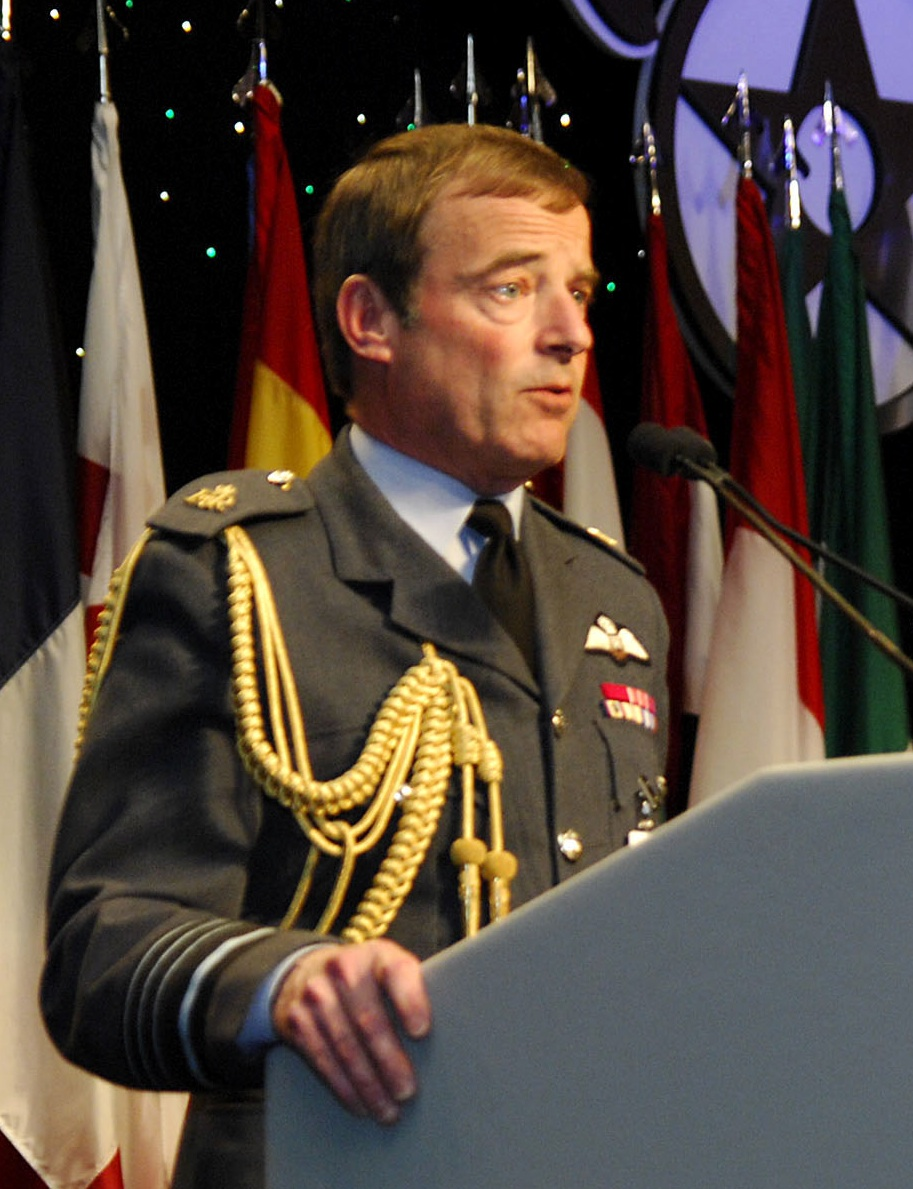
- Air Chief Marshal Sir Glenn Torpy in September 2007
- Born: 27 July 1953 (age 73); Ely, Cambridgeshire
- Military career
- Allegiance: United Kingdom
- Branch: Royal Air Force
- Service years: 1974–2009
- Rank: Air Chief Marshal
- Commands: Chief of the Air Staff (2006–09); Chief of Joint Operations (2004–06); No. 1 Group (2001–03); RAF Bruggen (1995–97); No. 13 Squadron (1989–92)
- Conflicts: Gulf War; Iraq War
- Awards: Knight Grand Cross of the Order of the Bath; Commander of the Order of the British Empire; Companion of the Distinguished Service Order; Officer of the Legion of Merit (United States)

Air Chief Marshal Sir Glenn Lester Torpy, GCB, CBE, DSO (born 27 July 1953) is a retired senior Royal Air Force (RAF) commander. He was a fast jet pilot in the late 1970s and 1980s, saw active service during the Gulf War and then went on to higher command. He was the air component commander on Operation Telic (British operations in Iraq) and served as Chief of the Air Staff, the professional head of the RAF, from 2006 to 2009. In that role Torpy hosted the RAF's biggest air display in two decades, and argued for consolidation of all British air power in the hands of the RAF.

== Early life ==
The son of Gordon Torpy and Susan Torpy (née Lindsey), Torpy obtained a BSc degree in aeronautical engineering from Imperial College London.

== Military career ==
Torpy joined the Royal Air Force as a pilot officer on 8 September 1974, and spent his early career undertaking flying duties in Jaguar aircraft before qualifying as a weapons instructor on Hawk aircraft. He was promoted to flying officer on 8 March 1975, with seniority backdated to 8 June 1973, flight lieutenant on 8 December 1975, and squadron leader on 1 July 1983.

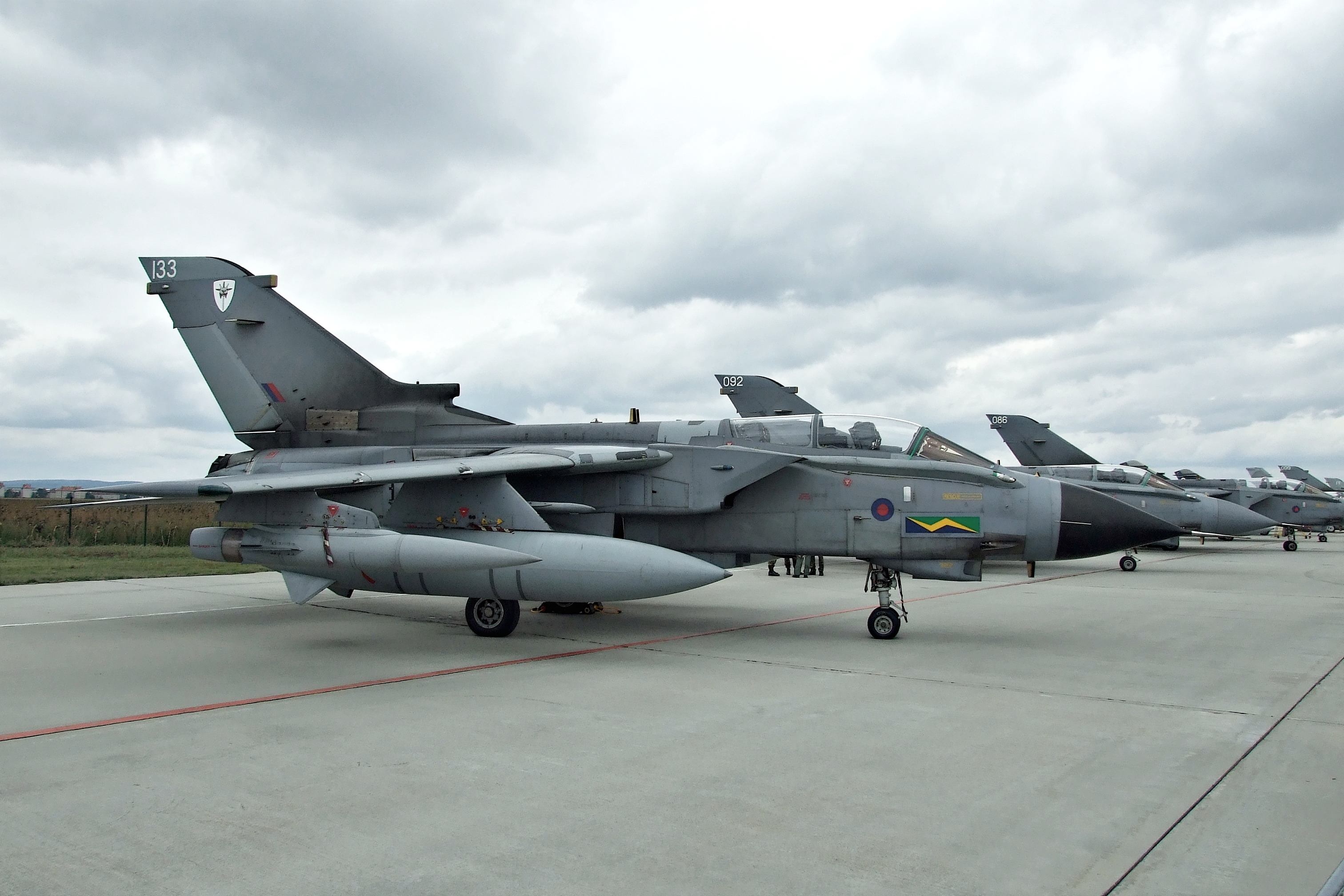
Tornado, a type flown by Torpy in the 1990s

Torpy's early commands included a tour as a squadron leader with No. 41 Squadron flying Jaguar aircraft before being appointed Officer Commanding No. 13 Squadron in 1989. Having been promoted to wing commander on 1 July 1989, Torpy saw active service during the Gulf War with No. 13 Squadron and was subsequently appointed a Companion of the Distinguished Service Order. He was made personal staff officer to the Air Officer Commanding RAF Strike Command in 1992.

Promoted to group captain on 1 July 1993, Torpy was appointed station commander at RAF Bruggen, Germany, in 1995. After promotion to air commodore on 1 January 1997, he attended the Royal College of Defence Studies in 1997. He was appointed Assistant Chief of Staff (Operations) at Permanent Joint Headquarters in Northwood in 1998 and director of air operations at the Ministry of Defence in 1999. Torpy was appointed a Commander of the Order of the British Empire in the 2000 New Year Honours and became Assistant Chief of Defence Staff (Operations) at the Ministry of Defence in 2000.

From 2001 to 2003 Torpy was Air Officer Commanding No. 1 Group, and also served as the air component commander for Operation Telic (British operations in Iraq). He was awarded the Legion of Merit (Degree of Officer) from the United States in "recognition of gallant and distinguished services during coalition operations in Iraq" in 2003. He was promoted to air vice marshal on 1 January 2001, and to air marshal on 18 July 2003.

From 2003 to 2004 Torpy was deputy commander-in-chief at RAF Strike Command. On 26 July 2004, he was appointed chief of joint operations at the Permanent Joint Headquarters in Northwood. He was appointed Knight Commander of the Order of the Bath in the 2005 New Year Honours.

With promotion to air chief marshal on 13 April 2006, Torpy became Chief of the Air Staff and an air aide-de-camp to Her Majesty the Queen on 13 April 2006. He was appointed Knight Grand Cross of the Order of the Bath in the 2008 Birthday Honours. In July 2008, Torpy hosted the RAF's biggest air display in two decades, as a 35-mile-long (56 km) procession of aircraft flew past the queen to commemorate the service's 90th anniversary. Controversially, in June 2009, he argued for consolidation of all British air power in the hands of the RAF, effectively questioning the future of the Royal Navy's jet aircraft.

Torpy retired from the RAF in July 2009, and became senior military advisor to BAE Systems. He was also Chairman of the Trustees of the RAF Museum and a governor of Haberdashers' Aske's Boys' School.

== Personal life ==
Torpy married Christine Jackson in 1977. His interests include golf, sailing, hill walking, military history and cabinet making.

Military offices
Preceded by R.A. Wright	Station Commander RAF Bruggen; 1995–1996	Succeeded by Nigel Maddox
Preceded by P.V. Harris	Air Officer Commanding No. 1 Group; 2001–2003	Succeeded by Chris Moran
Preceded by Sir Brian Burridge	Deputy Commander-in-Chief Strike Command; 2003–2004	Succeeded by Sir Clive Loader
Preceded by Sir John Reith	Chief of Joint Operations; 2004–2006	Succeeded by Nick Houghton
Preceded by Sir Jock Stirrup	Chief of the Air Staff; 2006–2009	Succeeded by Sir Stephen Dalton
Honorary titles
Preceded by Sir Jock Stirrup	Honorary Colonel of 73 Engineer Regiment (Volunteers); 30 July 2008 – present	Incumbent
