= The House (magazine) =

British political magazine

- Editor in Chief: Alan White
- Editor: Francis Elliott
- Categories: Politics
- Frequency: Weekly
- Founded: 1976
- Company: Total Politics Group
- Country: United Kingdom
- Based in: London
- Language: English
- Website: The House

The House is a weekly political magazine relating to the British Houses of Parliament.

== History and profile ==
It was founded in 1976 by MPs including Mike Thomas, Richard Faulkner and Patrick Cormack. It is published weekly when Parliament is sitting, and offers interviews with politicians, news, opinion, analysis and coverage from both the House of Commons and the House of Lords.

As of March 2022, The House magazine and sister outlet Politics Home had a combined monthly readership of up to one million.

In June 2023, the magazine announced Francis Elliott, former Political Editor of The Times, had been appointed as its new Editor, succeeding Rosa Prince.
