= Roland Watson =

British journalist

Sir Roland Victor Watson, 6th baronet (born 4 March 1966) is a British journalist who is currently foreign editor for The Times, a role he began in 2014.

== Early life ==
Watson was born 4 March 1966 to James Andrew Watson and Christabel Mary Watson (née Carlisle), making him one of the Watson Baronets of Henrietta Street. He was educated at Eton College.

== Career ==
He was previously political editor of The Times from 2010 to 2013, having joined The Times in 1998 as a political correspondent.

Media offices
Preceded by Philip Webster	Political Editor of The Times; 2010–2013	Succeeded by Francis Elliott
