= Strike Attack Operational Evaluation Unit =

- Active: 5 October 1987 – 31 March 2004
- Disbanded: 31 March 2004
- Country: United Kingdom
- Branch: Royal Air Force
- Type: Flying squadron
- Role: Test and evaluation
- Part of: Air Warfare Centre (from 1994)
- Station: Boscombe Down
- Aircraft: BAE Harrier T4A & GR5/7; Panavia Tornado GR1/1A/1B; SEPECAT Jaguar GR1A, T2 & T2B

The Strike Attack Operational Evaluation Unit (SAOEU) or Strike Attack OEU, was a unit of the Royal Air Force based at Boscombe Down airfield in Wiltshire between 1987 and 2004. The unit operated the Panavia Tornado GR1 and GR4, BAE Harrier GR5 & T4A and SEPECAT Jaguar aircraft. The role of the SAOEU was to evaluate new and existing equipment and to develop fast-jet ground attack tactics to provide timely advice to the front line.

== History ==
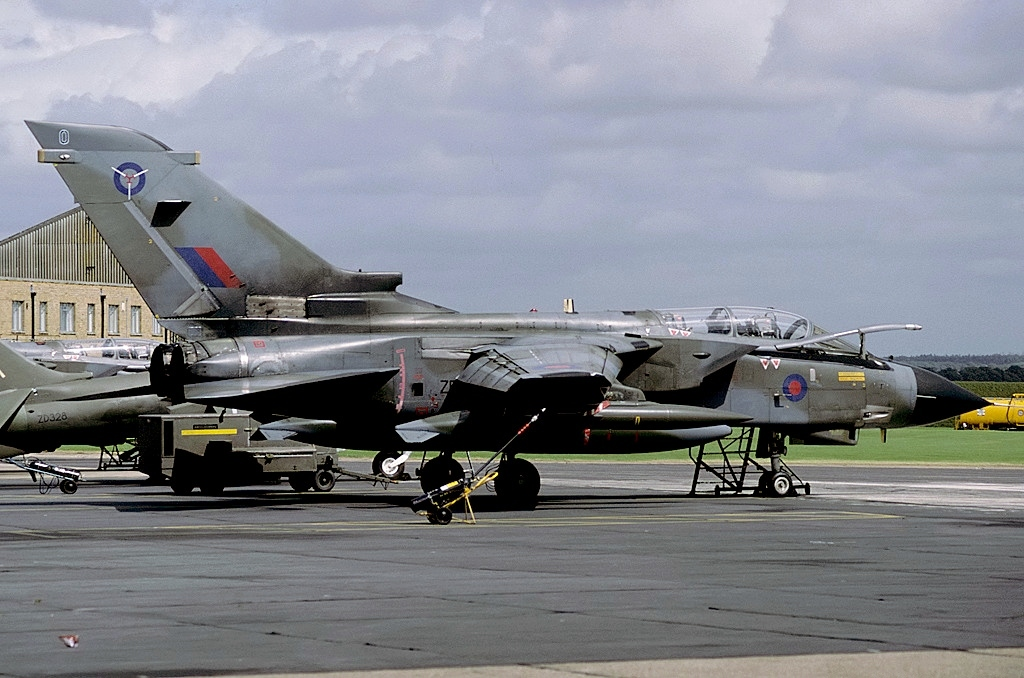
A Panavia Tornado GR1 of the Strike Attack Operational Evaluation Unit at Boscombe Down in July 1998

=== Tornado Operational Evaluation Unit ===
The Strike Attack Operational Evaluation Unit originated in the RAF's Tornado Operational Evaluation Unit (TOEU). The unit was formed on 1 September 1983 after the earlier introduction of the Panavia Tornado GR1 to the RAF during 1981. Boscombe Down airfield in Wiltshire was chosen as the home of the TOEU, and it benefited from working alongside the Aeroplane and Armament Experimental Establishment, which had already carried out various aircraft and weapons trials. Equipped with two Tornado GR1s, the TOEU's role was to test and evaluate the Tornado's weapons aiming systems & terrain following radar and conduct other trials as required. Although only anticipated to exist for two years, further requirements for development and trial work, led to the unit's retention.

=== Establishment ===
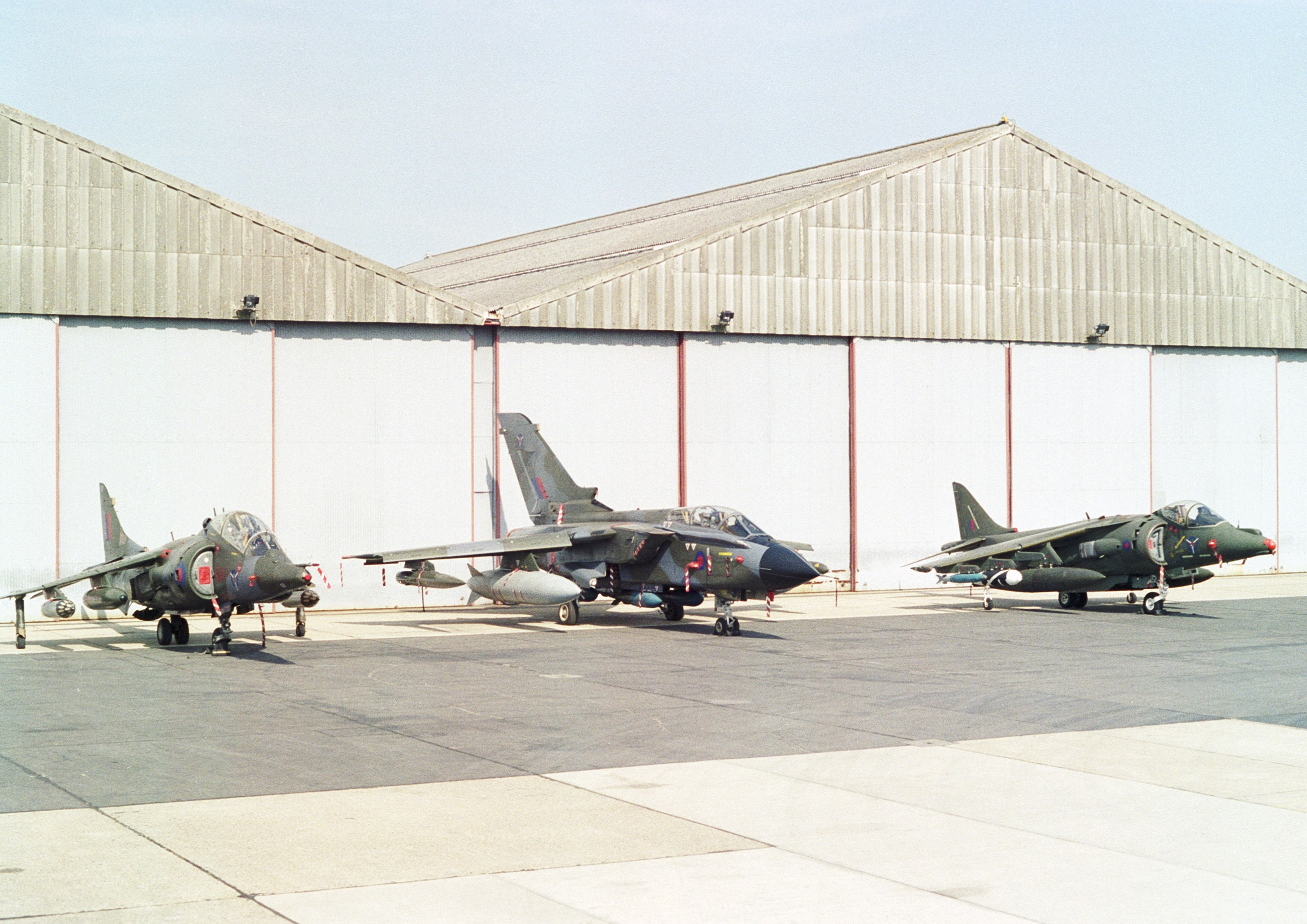
A Panavia Tornado GR1 and British Aerospace Harriers of the Strike Attack Operational Evaluation Unit at Boscombe Down in 1992

The Tornados were joined by the British Aerospace Harrier GR5 in 1988 and later by a Harrier T4A.. To reflect the wider range of aircraft operated, the unit was officially retitled as the Strike Attack Operational Evaluation Unit (SAOEU) on 5 October 1987. The majority of work involving the Harrier focussed on developing tactics and operating procedures for the new Harrier GR7.

During the mid-1990s, the RAF upgraded the SEPECAT Jaguar fleet; which led to the Jaguar being added to the SAOEU's fleet in 1996.

By 2001, the unit operated three Tornados, three Harriers and one Jaguar.

=== Merger ===
On 1 April 2004, after sixteen years of operations, the SAOEU was merged with the Panavia Tornado F3 Operational Evaluation Unit, based at RAF Coningsby in Lincolnshire, and the Air Guided Weapons Operational Evaluation Unit, based at RAF Valley in Anglesey. Together they formed the Fast Jet Weapons Operational Evaluation Unit (FJWOEU), which was established at RAF Coningsby. The FJWOEU later merged with the Fast Jet Test Squadron on 1 April 2006 and took on the No. 41 Squadron numberplate, to become No. 41 (Test and Evaluation) Squadron.

== Operations ==
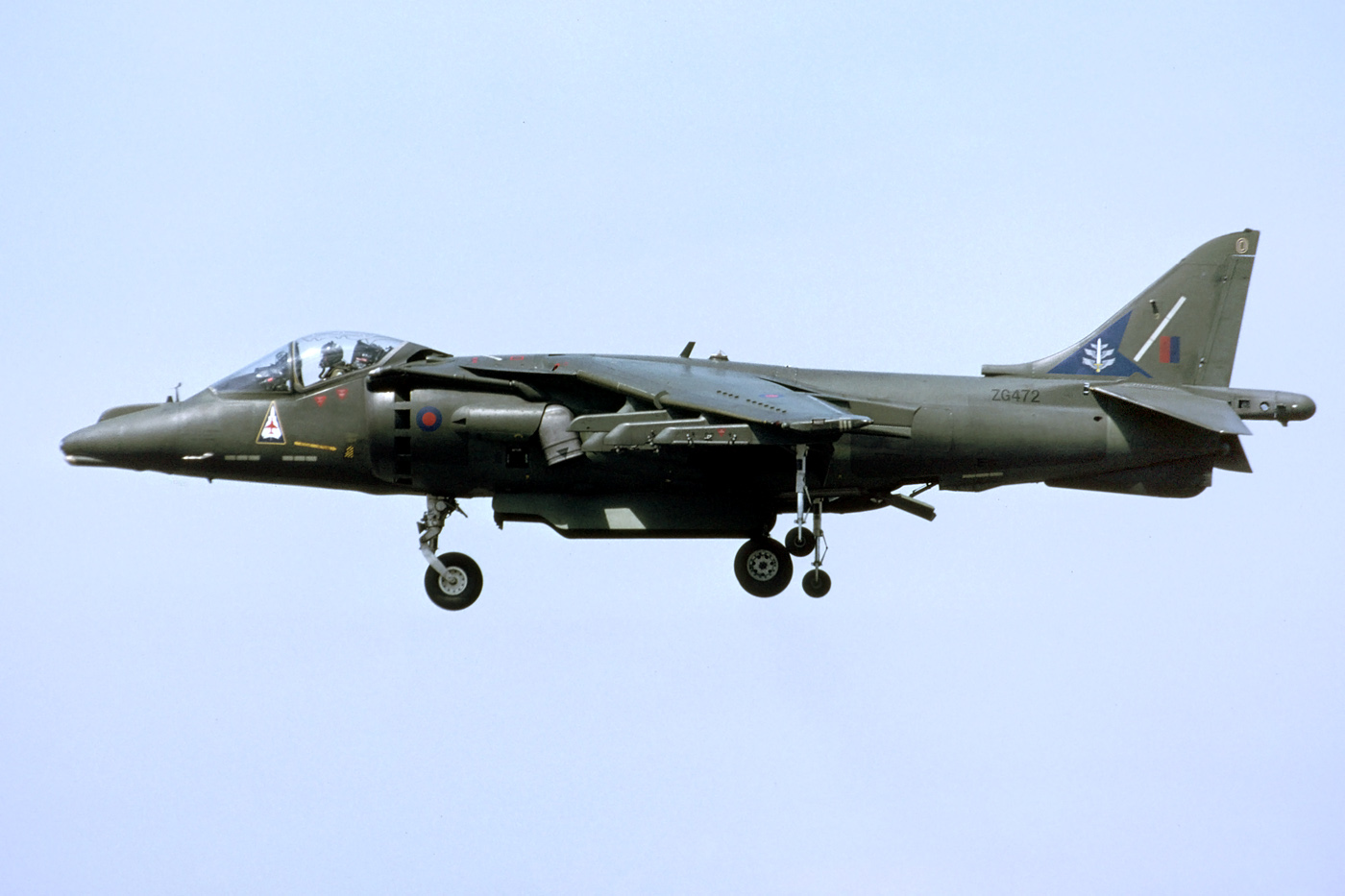
A BAE Harrier GR7 of the Strike Attack Operational Evaluation Unit during 1996

The role of the SAOEU was to evaluate new and existing equipment and develop fast-jet ground attack tactics to provide timely advice to the front line.

All aircrew were either Qualified Weapons Instructors (QWIs) or Electronic Warfare Instructors (EWIs), each with over 1,500 flying hours on their respective aircraft. Around 65 engineering personnel maintained the SAOEU fleet.

SAOEU work was tasked by the Air Warfare Centre, Headquarters of No. 1 Group or Headquarters of RAF Strike Command.

=== Special Projects Team ===
The Special Projects Team (SPT) flight was led by a Flight Lieutenant and was tasked with fitting experimental modifications for trial or urgent requirements to all three of the SAOEU's aircraft types. The team was responsible for drafting the engineering procedures to allow others to implement the modifications once approved.

=== Deployments ===
The unit deployed to the United States annually for a series of trials codenamed Exercise Highrider. Based at Naval Air Weapons Station (NAWS) China Lake in California, the unit took advantage of the favourable climate and extensive range facilities at China Lake and the Nellis Test and Training Range in Nevada. Highrider exercises allowed the unit to drop live weaponry on a more reliable basis than in the UK, where the only range where live weapons can be used is at Cape Wrath in the Scottish Highlands.

The SAOEU also regularly participated in Combined Qualified Weapons Instructor (CQWI) courses and NITEX exercises at RAF Leuchars in Fife, where they operated alongside other RAF and NATO units.

== See also ==
- List of Royal Air Force units & establishments

== Sources ==
- Hunter, J. (2001). "The Evaluators". The Royal Air Force Yearbook 2001. The RAF Benevolent Fund Enterprises. ISSN 1465-5829.
- March, P. (1989). Royal Air Force Yearbook 1989. Fairford, UK: Royal Air Force Benevolent Fund.
- Sturtivant, R.; Hamlin, J. (2007). Royal Air Force flying training and support units since 1912. UK: Air-Britain (Historians). ISBN 978-0851-3036-59.
