= Stuart Peach =

Royal Air Force officer (born 1956)

Air Chief Marshal The Right Honourable The Lord Peach KG GBE KCB DL
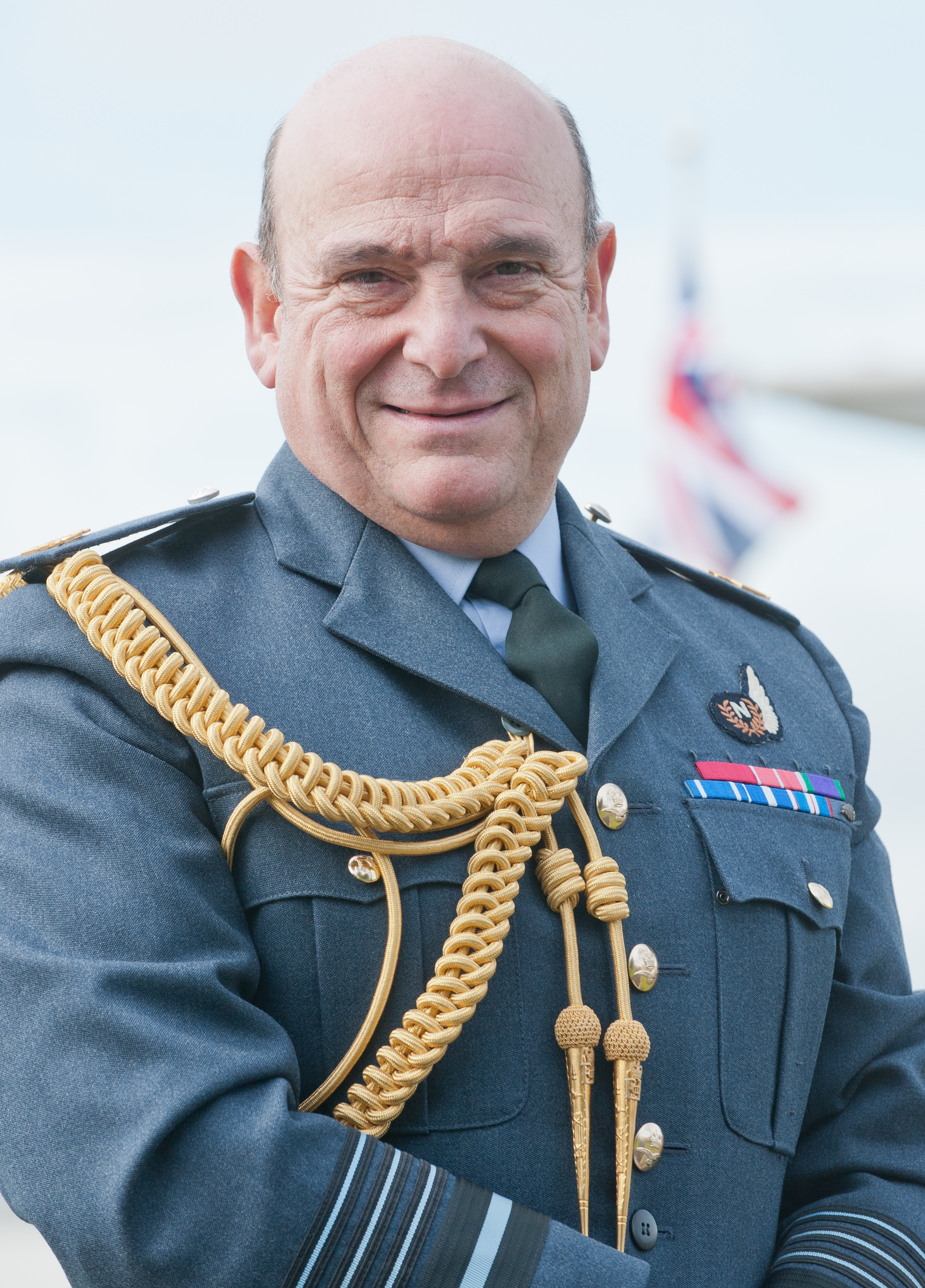
- Peach in 2012

Member of the House of Lords
- Lord Temporal
- Life peerage 21 November 2022

Chair of the NATO Military Committee
- In office 29 June 2018 – 25 June 2021
- Preceded by: Petr Pavel
- Succeeded by: Rob Bauer

Personal details
- Born: 22 February 1956 (age 70) Walsall, Staffordshire, England
- Party: Crossbencher
- Spouse: Brigitte Ender (m. 1986)
- Children: 2
- Education: University of Sheffield; Downing College, Cambridge

Military service
- Allegiance: United Kingdom
- Branch/service: Royal Air Force
- Years of service: 1974–2022
- Rank: Air Chief Marshal
- Commands: Chair of the NATO Military Committee; Chief of the Defence Staff; Joint Forces Command; Chief of Joint Operations; Chief of Defence Intelligence; Air Warfare Centre; NATO Air Commander (Forward), Kosovo; IX (Bomber) Squadron
- Battles/wars: Operation Jural; Kosovo
- Awards: Knight Companion of the Order of the Garter; Knight Grand Cross of the Order of the British Empire; Knight Commander of the Order of the Bath; Queen's Commendation for Valuable Service in the Air; Commander First Class of the Order of King Abdulaziz (Saudi Arabia); Commander of the Legion of Merit (United States); National Intelligence Distinguished Service Medal (United States)

Air Chief Marshal Stuart William Peach, Baron Peach (born 22 February 1956) is a British retired senior Royal Air Force officer. After training as a navigator, Peach commanded IX (Bomber) Squadron and then became Deputy Station Commander RAF Bruggen. He was deployed as NATO Air Commander (Forward) in Kosovo in 2000. He went on to be Chief of Defence Intelligence in 2006, Chief of Joint Operations in 2009 and the first Commander of Joint Forces Command in December 2011 before being appointed Vice-Chief of the Defence Staff in May 2013. Peach succeeded General Sir Nick Houghton as Chief of the Defence Staff on 14 July 2016. He succeeded General Petr Pavel as Chairman of the NATO Military Committee on 29 June 2018, serving as such until his retirement from NATO in June 2021.

== Early life and education ==
Peach was born on 22 February 1956 in Walsall, Staffordshire to Clifford Peach and Jean Mary Peach (nee Noakes). He was educated at Aldridge Grammar School, in Aldridge, Staffordshire. He studied geography, economics, and social history at the University of Sheffield, graduating with a Bachelor of Arts (BA) degree in 1977. He later studied at Downing College, Cambridge, and completed a Master of Philosophy (MPhil) degree in 1997.

== Service career ==
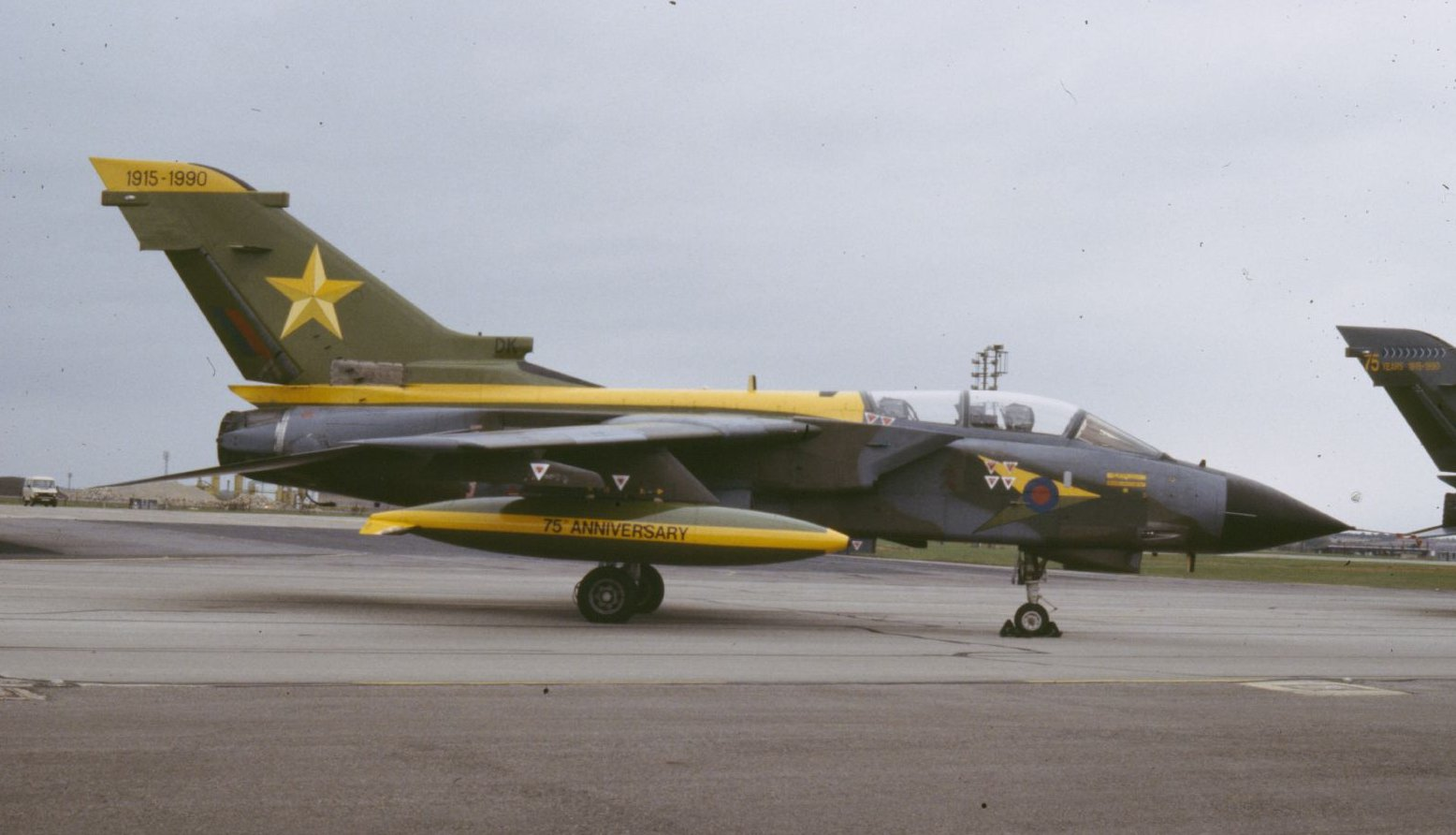
A Tornado GR1 in 1988: Peach served as a navigator on this type of aircraft

Peach was appointed an acting pilot officer on 1 September 1974 and was commissioned on graduation from university as a substantive pilot officer on 15 July 1977; he was promoted to flying officer on 15 January 1978 and to flight lieutenant on 15 October 1978. A navigator, Peach was posted to No. 13 Squadron in 1979 and served a tour on the English Electric Canberra in the photographic reconnaissance role before being transferred to IX (Bomber) Squadron in 1982 where he served on the ground attack variant of the Panavia Tornado in the UK. He transferred to No. 31 Squadron in 1984 and served on the Tornado in Germany. Promoted to squadron leader on 1 July 1986, he became a Qualified Weapons Instructor and received the Queen's Commendation for Valuable Service in the Air in the 1990 Birthday Honours List.

After Staff College in 1990 he returned to Germany to serve as Personal Staff Officer to, in turn, Deputy Commander RAF Germany, Commander-in-Chief RAF Germany and Commander Second Allied Tactical Air Force (of which RAF Germany formed a part), being promoted to wing commander on 1 July 1991. Peach saw action as a Detachment Commander in Saudi Arabia during Operation Jural. From 1994 to 1996 Peach commanded IX (Bomber) Squadron operating in the Strike, Attack and SEAD role, also acting as Deputy Station Commander RAF Bruggen.

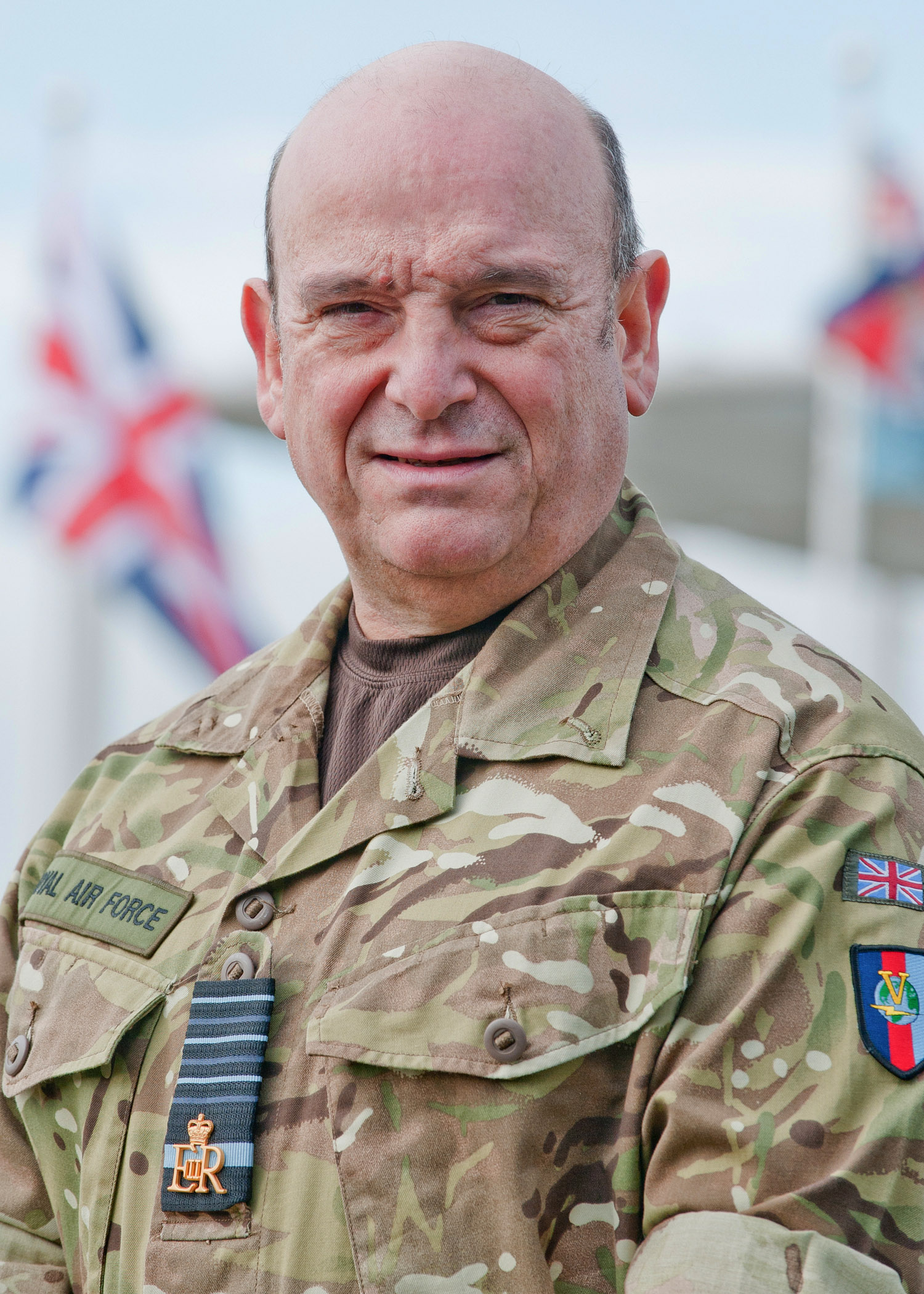
Stuart Peach in MTP Uniform, 2012

Following promotion to group captain on 1 July 1996, Peach became Director Defence Studies (Royal Air Force) in 1997, commissioning scholarship, editing books and writing articles on air power: he secured an MPhil from Downing College, Cambridge at that time. In 1999 he was appointed Assistant Director of the Higher Command and Staff Course at the Joint Services Command and Staff College (having previously graduated from that course). He served as Commander British Forces Italy from 1999 to 2000 and NATO Air Commander (Forward) in Kosovo in 2000, as a result of which he was appointed a Commander of the Order of the British Empire on 6 April 2001.

=== Air officer ===
From July 2000 to June 2003, Peach was Commandant of the Air Warfare Centre, and Assistant Chief of Staff Intelligence at RAF Strike Command. He was promoted to air commodore on 1 January 2001.

Promoted to air vice marshal on 1 August 2003, Peach served as Director General Intelligence Collection from July 2003 to March 2006. He was promoted to air marshal on 17 March 2006, and appointed Chief of Defence Intelligence, becoming Chief of Joint Operations in March 2009, having been appointed Knight Commander of the Order of the Bath (KCB) in the 2009 New Year Honours List.

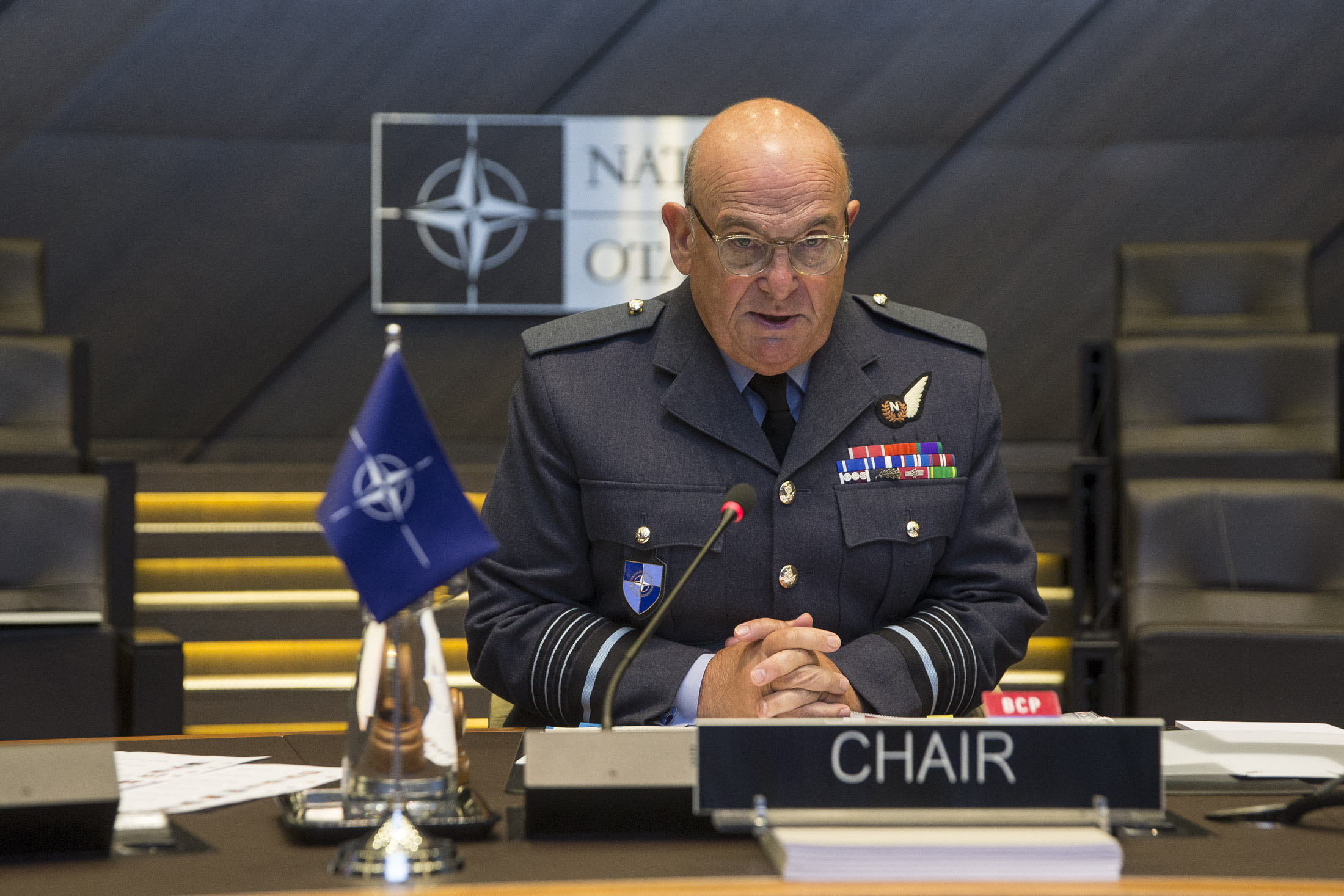
Peach as Chairman of the NATO Military Committee, 2020

Peach was promoted to air chief marshal and appointed the first commander of the new Joint Forces Command in December 2011. He went on to become Vice-Chief of the Defence Staff in May 2013. As of 2015, Peach was paid a salary of between £190,000 and £194,999 by the department, making him one of the 328 most highly paid people in the British public sector at that time. He was appointed Knight Grand Cross of the Order of the British Empire (GBE) in the 2016 New Year Honours.

On 22 January 2016, the Ministry of Defence announced that Peach would succeed General Sir Nick Houghton as Chief of the Defence Staff in summer 2016. Peach took over on 14 July 2016. He succeeded General Petr Pavel as Chairman of the NATO Military Committee on 29 June 2018. For his services in the role, Peach was awarded the Joint Staff Medal from Italy, appointed a Commander First Class of the Order of King Abdulaziz by Saudi Arabia, and award the Commander of the Legion of Merit and National Intelligence Distinguished Service Medal by the United States. In December 2021 Peach became the Prime Minister's Special Envoy for the Western Balkans. He retired in March 2022.

== House of Lords ==
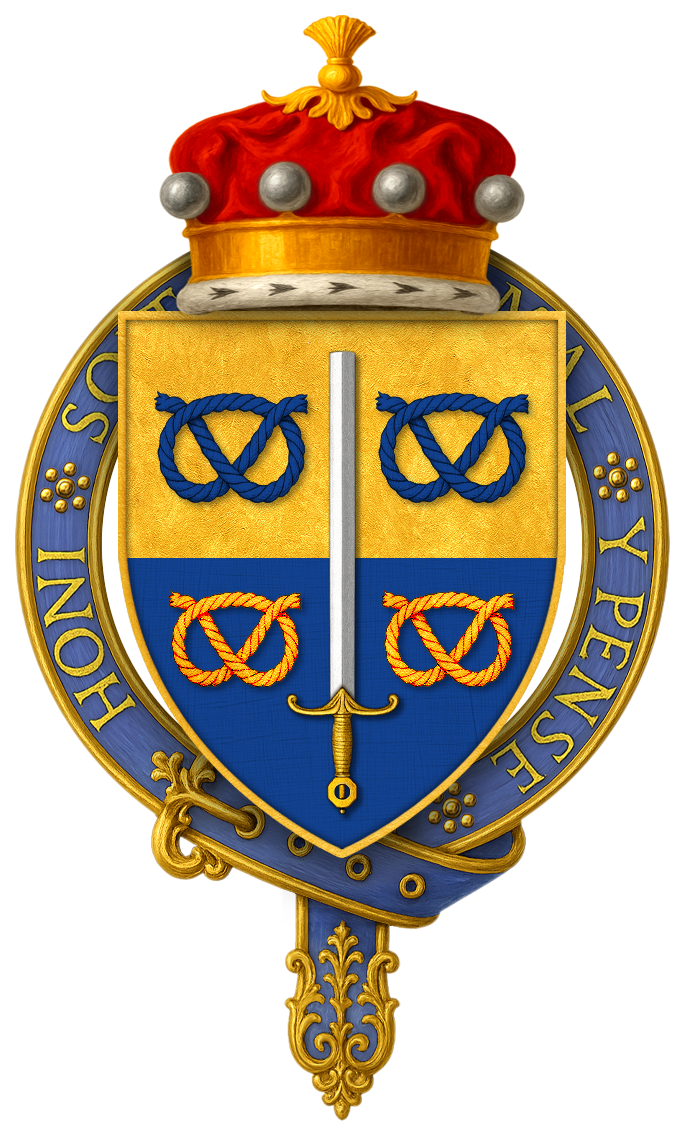
Garter-encircled arms of Lord Peach: Per fess Or and Azure the Sword of Mercy erect pommel in base Proper between four Stafford Knots all counterchanged.

It was announced on 14 October 2022 that Peach would be appointed a life peer by King Charles III. On 21 November 2022, he was created Baron Peach, of Grantham in the County of Lincolnshire. He sits as a crossbencher.

He carried Curtana, the Sword of Mercy, at the Coronation of Charles III and Camilla.

On St George's Day 2024, Peach was appointed a Knight Companion of the Order of the Garter.

== Family and personal life ==
Peach married Brigitte Ender in 1986; they have one son and one daughter. He was President of the RAF Rugby League; he is interested in sports, military history and cooking.

Peach has an honorary DTech degree from Kingston University and an honorary LittD degree from the University of Sheffield. He is an Honorary Fellow of Downing College, Cambridge.

== Books ==
- Peach, Stuart, ed. (1998). Perspectives on Air Power: air power in its wider context. The Stationery Office. ISBN 978-0117728882.

Military offices
Preceded by R J Horwood	Commandant Air Warfare Centre; 2000–2003	Succeeded by Chris Nickols
Preceded by Michael Laurie	Director General Intelligence Collection; 2003–2006	Succeeded by John Rose
Preceded by Andrew Ridgway	Chief of Defence Intelligence; 2006–2009	Succeeded by Chris Nickols
Preceded by Nick Houghton	Chief of Joint Operations; 2009–2011	Succeeded by David Capewell
New title	Commander, Joint Forces Command; 2011–2013	Succeeded by Sir Richard Barrons
Preceded by Sir Nick Houghton	Vice-Chief of the Defence Staff; 2013–2016	Succeeded by Sir Gordon Messenger
Preceded by Sir Nick Houghton	Chief of the Defence Staff; 2016–2018	Succeeded by Sir Nick Carter
Preceded by Petr Pavel	Chair of the NATO Military Committee; 2018–2021	Succeeded by Rob Bauer
Orders of precedence in the United Kingdom
Preceded by The Lord Prentis of Leeds	Gentlemen; Baron Peach	Followed by The Lord Watson of Wyre Forest
