= Watson baronets of Henrietta Street (1866) =

Watson baronets
- Arms of the Watson baronets of Henrietta Street
- Creation date: 1866
- Status: extant
- Motto: Πάθηματα Μάθηματα, Sufferings are lessons
- Arms: Azure, on a fesse dancetté between three crescents Argent, as many martlets Sable.
- Crest: A gryphon's head erased Azure, ducally crowned Or, between two branches of palm Proper

The Watson baronetcy, of Henrietta Street, Cavendish Square, in the parish of St Marylebone in the County of Middlesex, was created in the Baronetage of the United Kingdom on 27 June 1866 for the physician Sir Thomas Watson, Bt. He was President of the Royal College of Physicians and physician in ordinary to Queen Victoria.

The Official Roll marks the title "vacant".

== Watson baronets, of Henrietta Street (1866) ==
- Sir Thomas Watson, 1st Baronet (1792–1882)
- Sir Arthur Townley Watson, 2nd Baronet (1830–1907)
- Sir Charles Rushworth Watson, 3rd Baronet (1865–1922)
- Sir Thomas Aubrey Watson, 4th Baronet (1911–1941)
- Sir James Andrew Watson, 5th Baronet (1937–2025)
- Sir Roland Victor Watson, presumed 6th Baronet, (born 1966)
