= Watson baronets of Newport (1918) =

Watson baronets
- Arms of the Watson baronets of Newport, quartering Harrison
- Creation date: 1918
- Status: extinct
- Arms: Quarterly, 1st and 4th: Argent, on a chevron Azure, between three martlets Sable, as many roses Argent, barbed and seeded Proper (Watson); 2nd and 3rd: Argent, a bend embattled, counter-embattled Gules, over all in chief a portcullis Azure, all within a bordure of the Second (Harrison).
- Crest: In front of an increscent Argent, a gryphon’s head erased Sable, collared Or.

The Watson baronetcy, of Newport in the County of Monmouth, was created in the Baronetage of the United Kingdom on 13 February 1918 for Thomas Edward Watson, of Pyman & Watson, shipbrokers and coal merchants of Cardiff. The title became extinct on the death of the 3rd Baronet in 1959.

== Watson baronets, of Newport (1918) ==
- Sir Thomas Edward Watson, 1st Baronet (1851–1921). He married Elizabeth, daughter of Thomas Harrison, of Scarborough.
- Sir Wilfrid Hood Watson, 2nd Baronet (1875–1922)
- Sir Geoffrey Lewin Watson, 3rd Baronet (1879–1959)
Escutcheon of the Watson baronets of Newport, original version
