= Francis Elliott (journalist) =

British journalist

- Education: University of Oxford
- Occupation: Journalist
- Employer: The Times

Francis Elliott is a British journalist. He was political editor of The Times from 2013 to 2021.

Elliott read politics, philosophy and economics (PPE) at the University of Oxford. He worked for the New Statesman before stepping back to regional papers in Carlisle and Edinburgh. He was named Westminster editor for Scotland on Sunday in 1999, before spending two years at The Sunday Telegraph, including as deputy political editor.

After joining the Independent on Sunday politics team in 2003, Elliott moved to the position of Whitehall editor. In 2005 he was shortlisted by What the Papers Say for its 'Scoop of the Year' award in recognition of his work on Labour Party politician David Blunkett's business interests.

Elliott joined The Times as chief political correspondent in May 2007. As deputy political editor of the paper in 2010, Press Gazette named him the fifteenth highest-rated political reporter working in the UK. In September 2010, Elliott succeeded Jeremy Page as India correspondent for The Times. Based in Delhi, the role also involved Elliott reporting in countries such as Pakistan in wider South Asia.

Elliott wrote Cameron: Practically a Conservative, a biography of Prime Minister David Cameron co-authored with Independent on Sunday deputy editor James Hanning. In June 2013, he replaced Roland Watson as political editor of The Times. He handed over to Steven Swinford in 2021. After leaving The Times he began working as director of advocacy at the Engage Britain organisation and writing fortnightly political interviews for the i.

Elliott lives in East London with his wife and two children.

== Bibliography ==
- Elliott, Francis; Hanning, James (2007). Cameron: The Rise of the New Conservative. 4th Estate. ISBN 978-0007243662.
- Elliott, Francis; Hanning, James (2009). Cameron: Practically a Conservative. 4th Estate. ISBN 978-0007436422.

Media offices
Preceded by Roland Watson	Political Editor of The Times; 2013–2021	Succeeded by Steven Swinford
