= Nick Houghton =

British retired army officer (born 1954)

Field Marshal The Right Honourable The Lord Houghton of Richmond GCB CBE DL
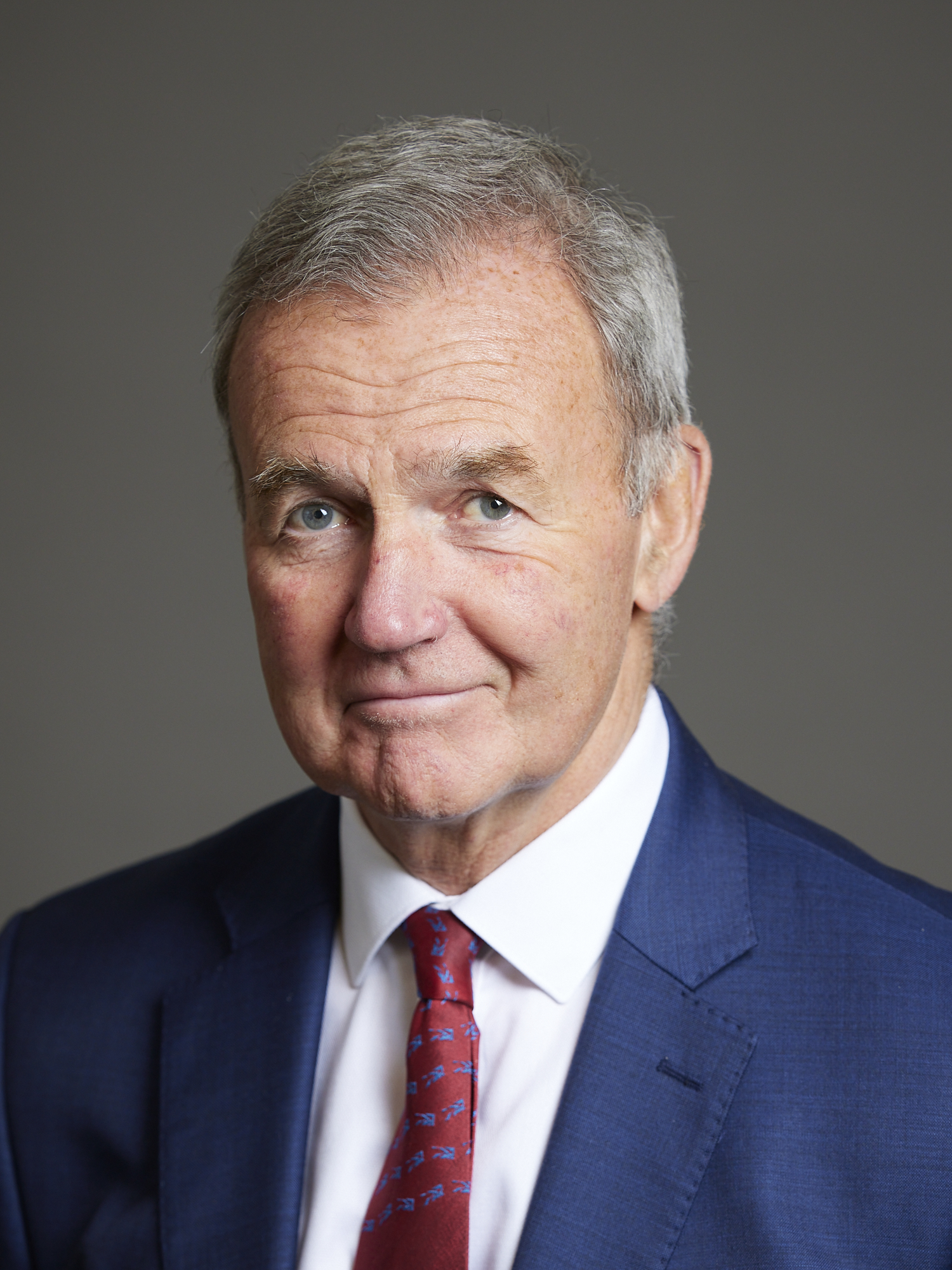
- Official portrait, 2023
- Born: 18 October 1954 (age 72); Otley, West Yorkshire, England
- Spouse: Margaret Glover (m. 1982)
- Military career
- Allegiance: United Kingdom
- Branch: British Army
- Service years: 1974–2016
- Rank: Field Marshal
- Service number: 497441
- Commands: Chief of the Defence Staff (2013‍–‍2016); Vice-Chief of the Defence Staff (2009‍–‍2013); Chief of Joint Operations (2006‍–‍2009); 39th Infantry Brigade (1997‍–‍1999); 1st Battalion, the Green Howards (1991‍–‍1994)
- Conflicts: The Troubles; Iraq War
- Awards: Knight Grand Cross of the Order of the Bath; Commander of the Order of the British Empire; Officer of the Legion of Merit (United States); Knight Grand Commander of the Order of Military Service (Malaysia)
- Other work: Constable of the Tower (2016‍–‍2022)

Member of the House of Lords
- Lord Temporal
- Life peerage 20 November 2017

Personal details
- Party: Crossbencher

Field Marshal John Nicholas Reynolds Houghton, Baron Houghton of Richmond, GCB, CBE, DL (/ˈhɔːtən/ HAW-tən; born 18 October 1954) is a retired senior British Army officer and former Chief of the Defence Staff (CDS) of the British Armed Forces. He was appointed CDS in July 2013, following the retirement of General Sir David Richards. He served as commanding officer of the 1st Battalion, the Green Howards in Northern Ireland during The Troubles and later became Commander of the 39th Infantry Brigade in Northern Ireland. He deployed as Senior British Military Representative and Deputy Commanding General, Multi-National Force – Iraq during the Iraq War. Later, he became Chief of Joint Operations at Permanent Joint Headquarters and served as Vice-Chief of the Defence Staff until assuming the position of CDS. Houghton retired from the British Army in July 2016, and was succeeded as CDS by Air Chief Marshal Sir Stuart Peach.

== Early life ==
Houghton was born on 18 October 1954 in Otley, near Leeds, and is the son of Frank and Peggy Houghton. He was educated at Woodhouse Grove School, a private school near Bradford. In 1977, he graduated from St Peter's College, Oxford, having taken an in-Service Bachelor of Arts degree in Modern History.

== Military career ==
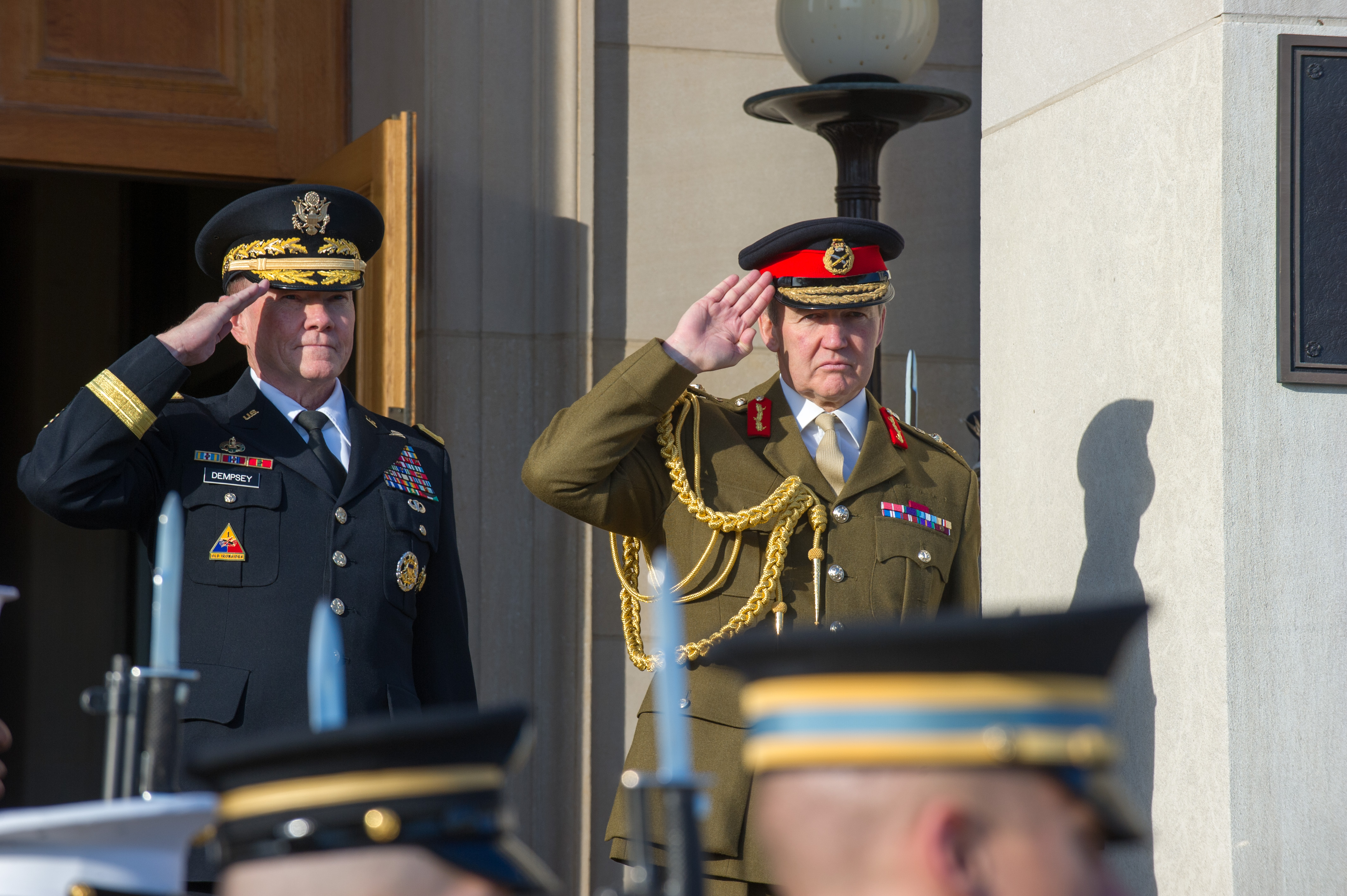
Houghton (right) taking the salute alongside his American counterpart in 2013

After attending Royal Military Academy Sandhurst, Houghton was commissioned into the Green Howards as a second lieutenant on 9 March 1974. He was promoted to lieutenant on 9 March 1976, to captain on 9 September 1980 and to major on 30 September 1986. He was appointed Military Assistant to the Chief of Staff British Army of the Rhine and subsequently became a member of the Directing Staff at the Royal Military College of Science, Shrivenham. Promoted to lieutenant colonel on 30 June 1991, he became commanding officer of 1st Battalion The Green Howards in 1991 and was deployed to Northern Ireland in 1993.

Houghton was made Deputy Assistant Chief of Staff at HQ Land Command in 1994 and he attended the Higher Command and Staff Course in 1997. Promoted to brigadier on 31 December 1997 with seniority from 30 June 1997, he became Commander of 39 Infantry Brigade in Northern Ireland in 1997 and was Director of Military Operations at the Ministry of Defence from December 1999 to July 2002. He was promoted to major general on 26 July 2002 and was made Chief of Staff of the Allied Rapid Reaction Corps that year before becoming Assistant Chief of the Defence Staff (Operations) in 2004.

Promoted to lieutenant general on 14 October 2005, Houghton was deployed as Senior British Military Representative and Deputy Commanding General, Multi-National Force – Iraq in October 2005. He became Chief of Joint Operations at Permanent Joint Headquarters (UK) in 2006 and, after being relieved of that post on 13 March 2009, he was promoted to general and appointed Vice-Chief of the Defence Staff on 5 May 2009.

Houghton took over as Chief of the Defence Staff on 18 July 2013. He stated that one of his key objectives was to re-shape the Armed forces in the post-Afghanistan era. Houghton also raised concerns about the Armed Forces' abilities with the personnel and budget cuts. As of 2015, Houghton was paid a salary of between £255,000 and £259,999 by the department, making him one of the 328 most highly paid people in the British public sector at that time.

In January 2016, the government announced that Houghton would be replaced by Sir Stuart Peach as Chief of the Defence Staff in the summer of 2016. Houghton handed over to Peach on 14 July 2016.

== Retirement ==
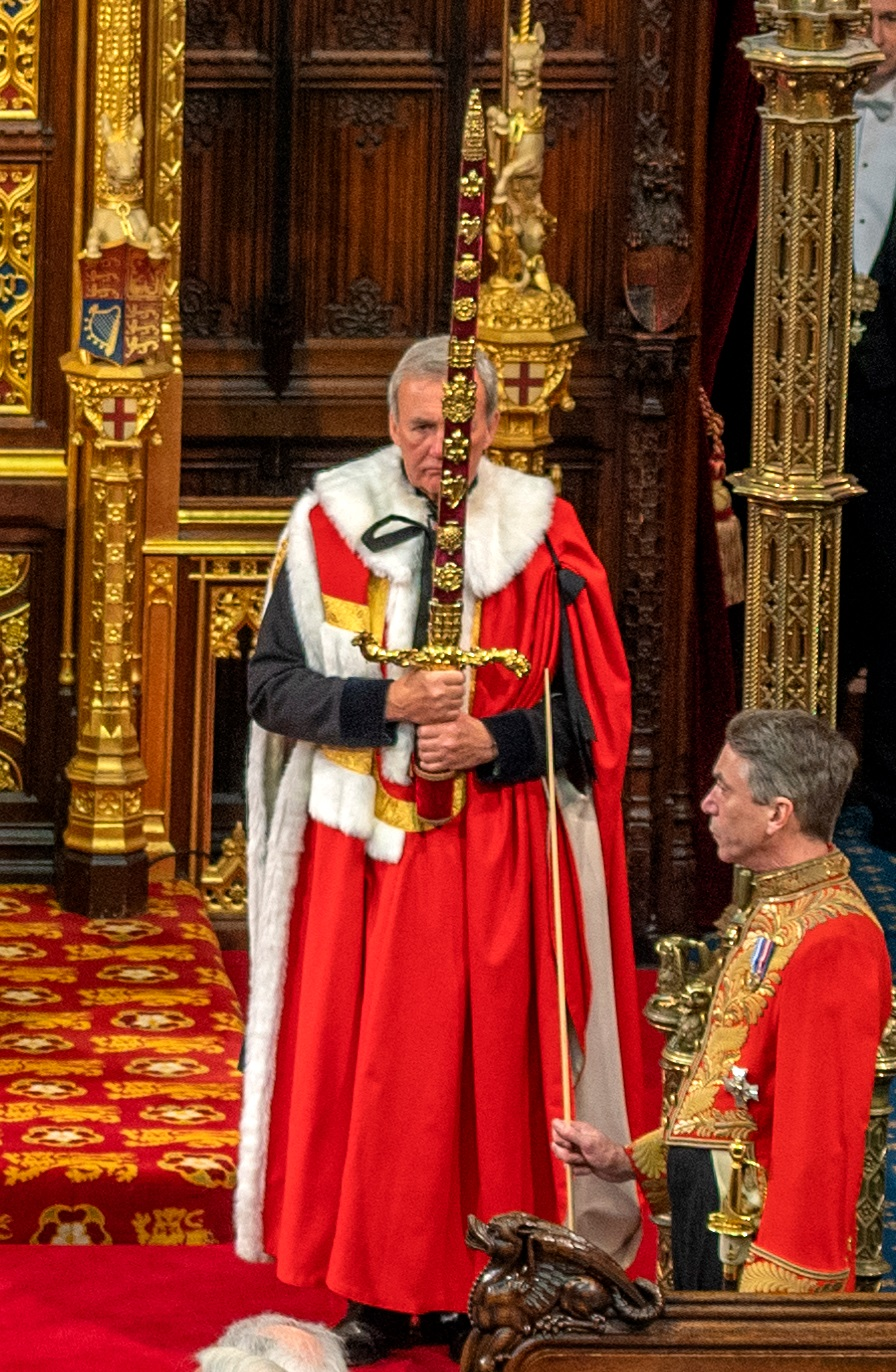
Holding the Sword of State in Parliament, 2022

In 2016, Houghton was appointed Constable of The Tower of London, as the monarch's representative for five years, replacing Richard Dannatt, Baron Dannatt. This is primarily a ceremonial post but the Constable is also a trustee of Historic Royal Palaces and the Royal Armouries. He left his role in 2022 with Sir Gordon Messenger replacing him.

In October 2017, it was announced that a life peerage would be conferred on Houghton. On 20 November of the same year, he was created Baron Houghton of Richmond, of Richmond in the County of North Yorkshire. He joined the House of Lords as a crossbencher. He has been a member of the International Relations and Defence Committee, a select committee of the House of Lords, since January 2024.

He was chosen to carry the Sword of Temporal Justice at the 2023 Coronation.

== Honours and decorations ==
On 12 October 1993, Houghton was appointed Officer of the Order of the British Empire (OBE) "in recognition of distinguished service in Northern Ireland". He was appointed Commander of the Order of the British Empire (CBE) on 14 April 2000 "in recognition of gallant and distinguished services in Northern Ireland during the period 1 April 1999 to 30 September 1999". In 2006, he was made an Officer of the Legion of Merit by the United States government "in recognition of gallant and distinguished services during coalition operations in Iraq". He was appointed Knight Commander of the Order of the Bath (KCB) in the 2008 Birthday Honours, and Knight Grand Cross of the Order of the Bath (GCB) in the 2011 Birthday Honours.

Houghton was Colonel of the Regiment of 158 (Royal Anglian) Transport Regiment (Volunteers) from 1 November 2003 to 1 September 2008 and honorary Colonel Commandant of the King's Division from 10 December 2005 to 10 December 2008 as well as Colonel of the Regiment of The Yorkshire Regiment from 6 June 2006 to 6 June 2011. He was appointed Colonel Commandant of the Intelligence Corps on 19 July 2008 and Aide-de-Camp General (ADC Gen) to The Queen on 1 October 2009.

In June 2015, Houghton also received an honorary Panglima Gagah Angkatan Tentera (PGAT) award from the Deputy Minister for Defence of Malaysia.

On 14 June 2025, Houghton, alongside his predecessor, The Lord Richards of Herstmonceux, was promoted honorary Field Marshal in the British Army.

== Personal life ==
In 1982 Houghton married Margaret Glover: they have one son, the comedian Hon. Thomas Houghton (born 1984), and one daughter. His interests include golf, sailing, shooting, cooking and history.

== Honours and awards ==

Ribbon	Description	Notes
	Knight Grand Cross of the Order of the Bath	Appointed in 2011
	Commander of the Order of the British Empire	Appointed in 2000
	General Service Medal (1962)	With "Northern Ireland" Clasp
	UN medal for the Mission in Cyprus	
	Iraq Medal	
	Queen Elizabeth II Golden Jubilee Medal	6 February 2002
	Queen Elizabeth II Diamond Jubilee Medal	6 February 2012
	Queen Elizabeth II Platinum Jubilee Medal	6 February 2022
	King Charles III Coronation Medal	6 May 2023
	Accumulated Campaign Service Medal	
	Medal for Long Service and Good Conduct (Military)	With 2 bars
	Officer of the Legion of Merit	Presented in 2006
	Courageous Commander of the Most Gallant Order of Military Service	From Malaysia; Presented in 2015

== Arms ==
Coat of arms of Nick Houghton
Granted 03/01/2018 Coronet Coronet of a Baron Crest A Hound statant proper, the dexter paw resting on a Trumpet Or Torse Mantling Argent and Vert. Helm Helmet of a Peer Escutcheon Vert, between in chief three Roses Argent, barbed and seeded Or, and in base a representation of the White Tower of London Argent, two Swords in saltire Argent hilted Or. Supporters Dexter: A Lion rampant Gules, armed and langued Azure, statant upon a Mask of Comedy Argent. Sinister: A Horse rampant Or, statant upon a closed Book Gules charged with a Quill pen Or, feathered Argent, bendwise. Compartment A Mount Vert. Motto BONE ET FIDELIS; Latin: Good and Faithful Orders The circlet, laurel branches and collar as Knight Grand Cross of the Order of the Bath (Appointed KCB 2008 and GCB 2011) Symbolism The White roses of Yorkshire represent his home. The swords represent his service in the army, and the castle represents Richmond Castle, in honor of his title as Lord Houghton of Richmond. The mask represents his comedian son, and the book represents his daughter. The supporter of a Lion represents Lord Houghton, while the horse represents Lady Houghton.

Military offices
Preceded by Robin Brims	Senior British Military Representative and Deputy Commanding General, Multinational Force, Iraq; 2005–2006	Succeeded by Robert Fry
Preceded by Sir Glenn Torpy	Chief of Joint Operations; 2006–2009	Succeeded by Sir Stuart Peach
Preceded by Sir Timothy Granville-Chapman	Vice-Chief of the Defence Staff; 2009–2013	Succeeded by Sir Stuart Peach
Preceded by Sir David Richards	Chief of the Defence Staff; 2013–2016	Succeeded by Sir Stuart Peach
New title	Colonel of the Yorkshire Regiment; 2006–2011	Succeeded by Graham Binns
Honorary titles
Preceded by The Lord Dannatt	Constable of the Tower of London; 2016–2022	Followed by Sir Gordon Messenger
Orders of precedence in the United Kingdom
Preceded by The Lord Hogan-Howe	Gentlemen; Baron Houghton of Richmond	Followed by The Lord Tyrie
