= Permanent Joint Headquarters =

British Armed Forces tri-service headquarters in Northwood, London

Coordinates: 51°37′10″N 0°24′34″W

- Active: 1996–present
- Country: United Kingdom
- Branch: Royal Navy; British Army; Royal Air Force
- Type: Joint command
- Part of: Cyber & Specialist Operations Command
- Location: Northwood Headquarters, Hertfordshire, England
- Nickname: PJHQ

Commanders
- Current commander: Air Marshal Allan Marshall

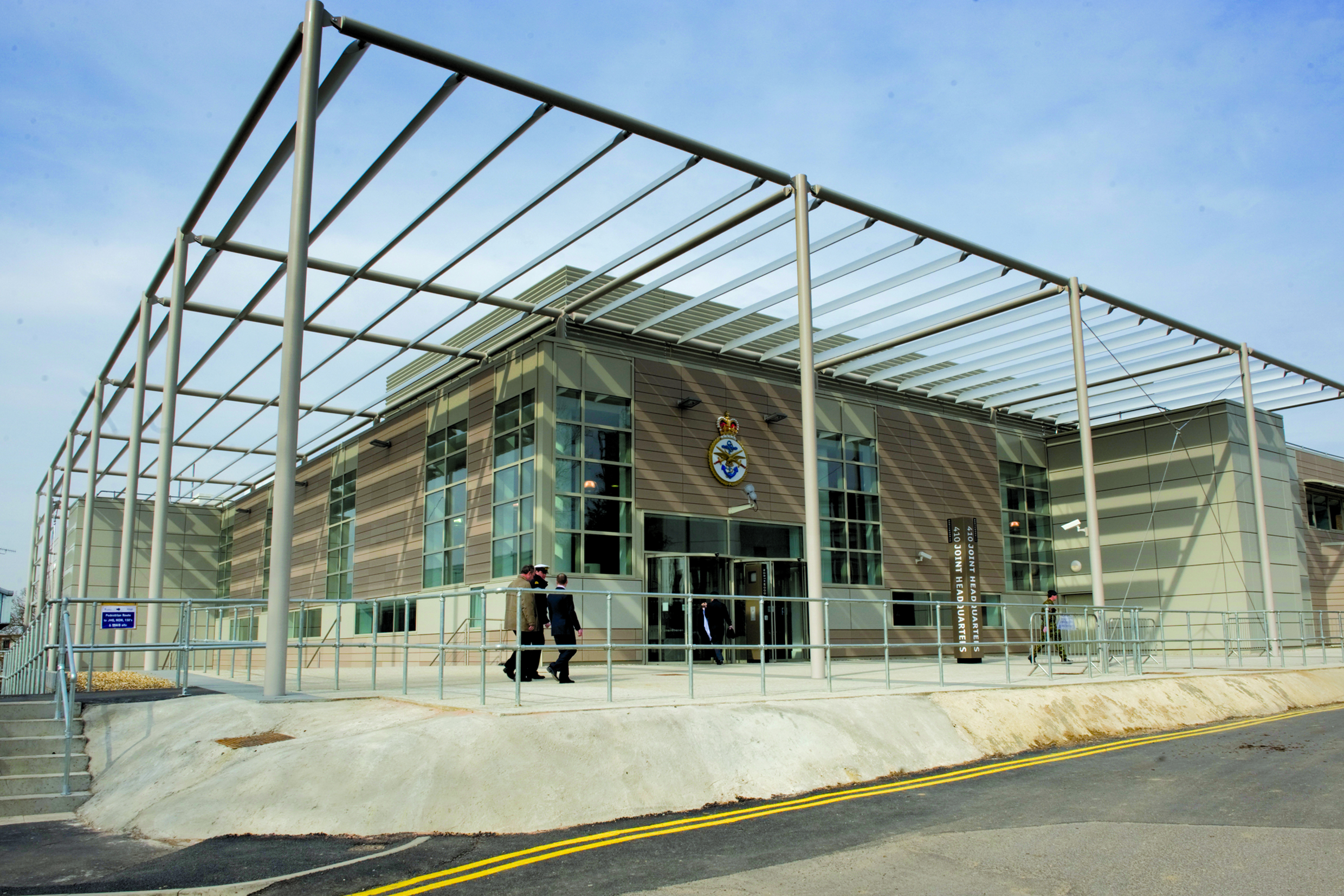
Permanent Joint Headquarters (PJHQ) at Northwood MOD

The Permanent Joint Headquarters (PJHQ) is the British tri-service headquarters from where all overseas military operations are planned and controlled. It is situated at Northwood Headquarters in Northwood, London. The Permanent Joint Headquarters is commanded by the Chief of Joint Operations (CJO), the position of which is currently held by Air Marshal Allan Marshall.

== History ==
Major General Christopher Wallace led the team that began establishing the headquarters from 1994. "Senior officers in the Army and RAF did not welcome this initiative and Wallace had to deploy his considerable skills of advocacy to win that battle" (to establish the new joint headquarters).

The Permanent Joint Headquarters was established on 1 April 1996 to enhance the operational effectiveness and efficiency of UK-led joint, potentially joint and multi-national operations, and to exercise operational command of UK forces assigned to multinational operations led by others. Wallace was appointed as CJO in the rank of lieutenant general. The PJHQ started to assume responsibility for military operations worldwide (fully operational) on 1 August 1996. The 35-hectare Northwood Headquarters site has belonged to the RAF since 1938.

By mid-1998, a short-notice deployable headquarters commanded by a Brigadier-equivalent officer, the Joint Force Headquarters (JFHQ) was being established within PJHQ. The JFHQ was an outgrowth of the PJHQ's J3 Operations staff. The JFHQ was described as 'capable of deploying into the field at very short notice,' by its first commander, Brigadier David Richards. Richards was appointed as Chief Joint Rapid Deployment Force Operations, and also to expand the concept that underpinned its creation, the Joint Rapid Reaction Forces. The JRRFs were to be "a pool of highly capable force elements, maintained at high and very high readiness," from which the UK was to meet all short notice contingencies. Initially planned to have a staff of 24, Richards expanded the JFHQ to 55 strong, 'something our training and experience on exercise was proving necessary.'

In 2007-2008, the PJHQ' s budget was estimated around £475 million.

In 2010, the PJHQ and its 600 staff officers and enlisted personnel moved to a contemporary building in Northwood, London. For the first time, all PJHQ staff were gathered under the same roof.

Among the operations supervised by PJHQ have been Operation Veritas (Afghanistan, 2001); Operation Telic (2003 invasion of Iraq); Operation Herrick (UK operations in Helmand Province, Afghanistan, from 2006); and Operation Pitting (evacuation of UK nationals and at-risk Afghanistanis from Kabul in 2021).

== Mission and duties ==
The PJHQ's mission is as follows:

"CJO is to exercise operational command of UK forces assigned to overseas joint and combined operations; and to provide politically aware military advice to the MOD in order to achieve MOD UK’s strategic objectives on operations"

PJHQ operates cyber operations in coordination with the Government Communications Headquarters in Cheltenham.

There are certain areas that the headquarters will not be involved in:

- Strategic Nuclear Deterrent (the Royal Navy Commander Operations is responsible)
- Defence of the UK Home Base, Territorial Waters and Airspace (Standing Joint Command is responsible)
- Northern Ireland (Army HQ Northern Ireland is responsible)
- Counter-terrorism in UK (Home Office is responsible)
- NATO Article V (General War) (NATO Military Command Structure is responsible)

As of November 2022, there were 567 military and civil service personnel assigned to PJHQ.

== Commanders ==
The Chief of Joint Operations (CJO) is the appointment held by the three star ranked officer that leads PJHQ.

Date of Appointment	Rank	Name	Branch
April 1996	Lieutenant General	Sir Christopher Wallace	British Army
February 1999	Vice Admiral	Sir Ian Garnett	Royal Navy
August 2001	Lieutenant General	Sir John Reith	British Army
26 July 2004	Air Marshal	Sir Glenn Torpy	Royal Air Force
March 2006	Lieutenant General	Sir Nicholas Houghton	British Army
13 March 2009	Air Marshal	Sir Stuart Peach	Royal Air Force
December 2011	Lieutenant General	Sir David Capewell	Royal Marines
January 2015	Lieutenant General	Sir John Lorimer	British Army
June 2017	Vice Admiral	Tim Fraser	Royal Navy
April 2019	Vice Admiral	Sir Ben Key	Royal Navy
November 2021	Lieutenant General	Sir Charles Stickland	Royal Marines
November 2024	Lieutenant General	Nick Perry	British Army
July 2026	Air Marshal	Allan Marshall	Royal Air Force

== See also ==
- Northwood Headquarters
