= FJCA =

FJCA may refer to:

- Fiji Court of Appeal
- Joint Combat Aircraft
