= Robert Oxland =

English Royal Air Force Air Vice-Marshal (1889-1959)

Air Vice Marshal Robert Oxland CB CBE
- Oxland in March 1944
- Born: 4 April 1889
- Died: 27 October 1959 (aged 70)
- Military career
- Allegiance: United Kingdom
- Branch: British Army (1915–18); Royal Air Force (1918–46)
- Service years: 1915–46
- Rank: Air Vice-Marshal
- Commands: No. 1 (Bomber) Group (1940–43); No. 503 Squadron RAF (1925–26); No. 502 Squadron RAF (1918–19)
- Conflicts: First World War; Second World War
- Awards: Companion of the Order of the Bath; Commander of the Order of the British Empire; Mentioned in Despatches (2); Commander's Cross with Star of the Order of Polonia Restituta (Poland)

Air Vice Marshal Robert Dickinson Oxland, CB, CBE (4 April 1889 – 27 October 1959) was a senior Royal Air Force officer and member of Bomber Command during the Second World War. He was air officer commanding No. 1 Group from 1940 to 1943.

== Early life ==
Robert Dickinson Oxland was born in Sydenham on 4 April 1889, the son of Charles Oxland, a Mining Engineer, and his wife Eleanor. He was educated at Bedford Modern School.

== Career ==
At the outbreak of the First World War, Oxland joined the County of London Yeomanry. He was commissioned in 1915 and seconded to the Royal Flying Corps in 1916 having learned to fly in Norwich, earning RAeC Certificate No. 2444 on 9 February 1916. He was with No. 20 Squadron in France in 1916 and with No. 38 Squadron in 1918.

Oxland transferred to the Royal Air Force in 1918. As a qualified meteorological observer his first postings were in Iraq as a specialist staff officer. He returned to England in 1925 as a squadron leader and was the first commanding officer of No. 502 Squadron RAF. In 1926, he was responsible for organising the formation of No. 503 Squadron RAF and was its commanding officer until 1930.

Oxland was promoted to wing commander in 1930 and thereafter ‘took a series of staff appointments at home and overseas’. In 1934 he was appointed to the Directorate of Operations and Intelligence at the Air Ministry. In 1936, as Director of the Air Ministry's Operational Requirements, Oxland was Chairman of the Committee that decided to produce the four-engined heavy bombers resulting in the Stirling, Halifax and Lancaster. In 1938 he was promoted to air commodore and the post of Director of Personal Services at the Air Ministry.

In November 1940 he was promoted to air officer commanding (AOC) No. 1 Group. During his time at HQ Bomber Command, "he concentrated on the direction of operations in support of Operation Overlord whilst Hugh Walmsley oversaw the area bombing programme". In February 1943 he was succeeded as AOC of No. 1 Group by Air Vice Marshal Edward Rice. Thereafter he held a ‘special appointment' at HQ Bomber Command and his final position from 1945 was AOA, HQ Air Command South East Asia.

Oxland retired in May 1946.

== Awards and honours ==
Oxland was invested as an Officer of the Order of the British Empire in 1929. In 1942 he was invested as Commander of the Order of the British Empire and a Commander's Cross with Star of the Order of Polonia Restituta. In 1943 he was made Companion of the Order of the Bath.

Oxland was also twice mentioned in despatches, on 1 January 1943 and 8 June 1944.

== Family life ==
Oxland was a member of the United Service Club. In 1929 he married Ethel Barbara Williams, daughter of Colonel Henry David Williams. They had two daughters. He died in Maidenhead, Berkshire on 27 October 1959.

Military offices
Preceded by John Breen	Air officer commanding No. 1 Group; 1940–1943	Succeeded by Edward Rice
