= No. 100 Squadron RAF =

Defunct flying squadron of the Royal Air Force

- Squadron badge
- Active: 1917–1918 (RFC); 1918–1942; 1942–1959; 1962–1968; 1972–2022
- Disbanded: 31 March 2022
- Country: United Kingdom
- Branch: Royal Air Force
- Type: Flying squadron
- Mottos: Sarang tebuan jangan dijolok (Malay for 'Never poke a hornet's nest')

Insignia
- Squadron badge heraldry: In front of two bones in saltire, a skull. The badge was the official version of a motif used by the squadron on the Western Front in 1917. Approved by King George VI in November 1937.
- Squadron roundel
- Squadron codes: RA (Apr 1939 – Sep 1939); HW (Dec 1942 – Apr 1951); AS/GB (1946); CA–CZ (Hawks)

Number 100 Squadron is a former Royal Air Force squadron. It last operated the British Aerospace Hawk T1, providing 'aggressor' aircraft for air combat training from RAF Leeming in North Yorkshire, UK.

== History ==
=== First World War ===
No. 100 was established on 23 February 1917 at Hingham in Norfolk as the Royal Flying Corps' first squadron formed specifically as a night bombing unit and comprised elements of the Home Defence Wing. Its first commanding officer was Major Grahame Christie.

The unit was mobilised and crossed from Portsmouth on 21 March 1917 to France and was first based at St Andre-aux-Bois, where it received twelve Royal Aircraft Factory F.E.2Bs aircraft on complement. These aircraft had been withdrawn from other units where they had operated in daylight, so modifications were required to adapt them for 100 Squadron's operational role.

On 1 April 1917, the unit moved to Izel-le-Hameau and took a further four aircraft on complement, in the form of B.E.2es. The squadron began operations on the night of 5/6 April 1917, when eleven FE2b aircraft attacked La Brayelle Airfield, Douai, where Manfred von Richthofen's 'Flying Circus' was based; Richthofen referred to this raid in his book, 'Der Rote Kampfflieger'. One hundred and twenty-eight 20 lb (9 kg) and four 40 lb (18 kg) bombs were dropped; four aircraft hangars were reported as having been set on fire and one of the attacking aircraft was lost.

On 4 March 1918, the squadron was sent to Ochey, near Nancy, to form the nucleus of the Independent Air Force under Major General Hugh Trenchard. In August of that year, the unit converted to Handley Page 0/400 heavy bombers and therefore longer range sorties over industrial sites in Germany became possible. The squadron conducted these raids throughout the rest of the war; an aircraft from the unit was the last in war-time to return to base (on the night before the Armistice) from a raid. On 17 November 1918, 100 Squadron moved to RAF Saint Inglevert.

=== Inter war period ===
After the end of the war, the squadron remained on the continent until September 1919 as a cadre before transferring to RAF Baldonnel, near Dublin and re-forming to full strength, re-equipping with Bristol F.2 Fighters for army co-operation. Close air support operations were flown during the Irish War of Independence. Following the end of hostilities the squadron was moved to Spitalgate, Lincolnshire in February 1922, and converted to bombing, this time with Vickers Vimys and DH9As.

In May 1924, the unit was re-equipped with the Fairey Fawn. With these aircraft, the squadron performed air-mail carrying services breaking the General Strike of 1926. In September of that year, the squadron took Hawker Horsley aircraft on complement and in November 1930 moved to Donibristle, Fife, converting to torpedo-bombing. Its revised official designation as 'No. 100 (Torpedo-Bomber) Squadron' came later, in 1933.

A further re-equipment came in November 1932, when the Vickers Vildebeest came on complement and with this aircraft the squadron was deployed as part of the operation to defend Singapore, arriving at Seletar in January 1934.

=== Second World War ===
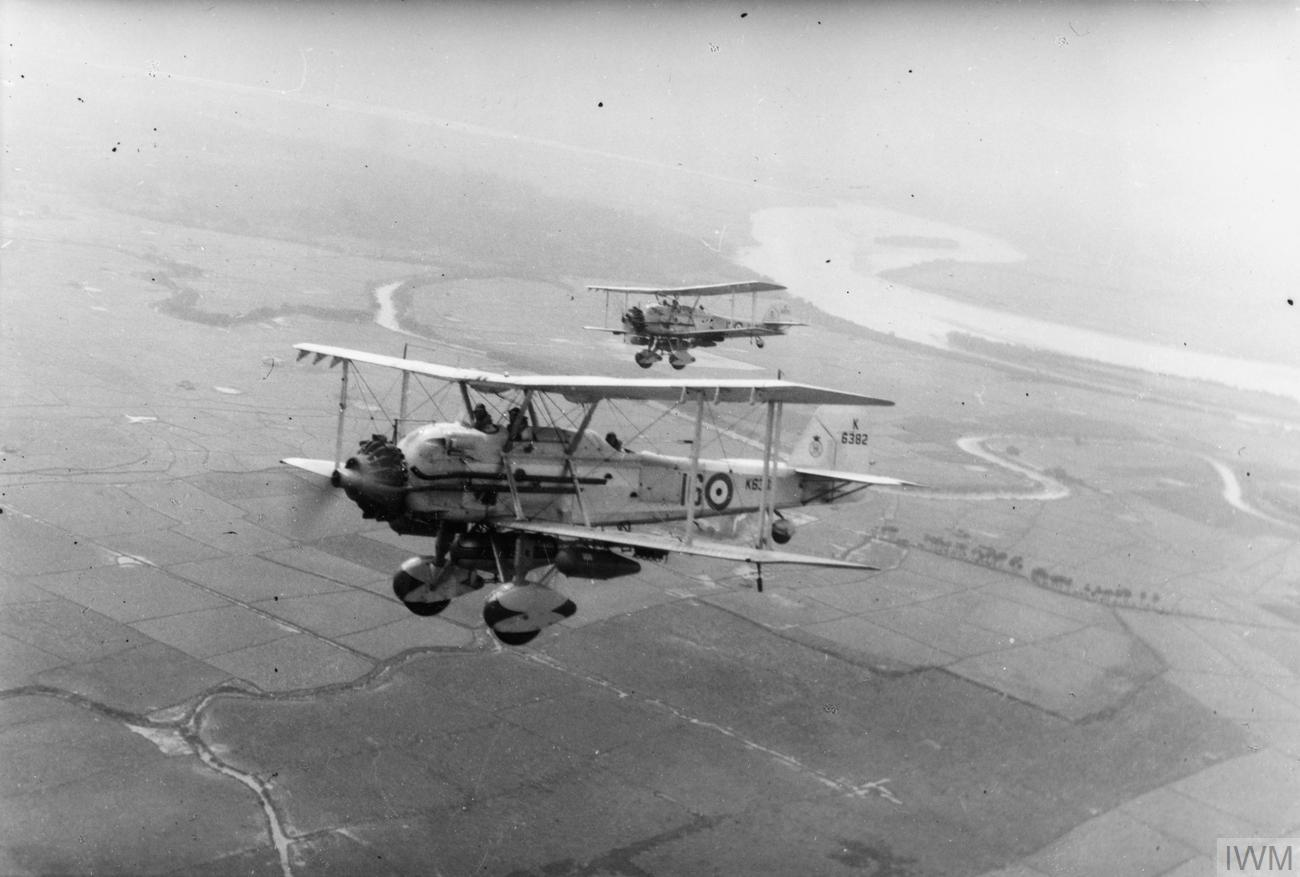
Vickers Vildebeest Mark III torpedo bombers of 100 Squadron approaching Tavoy, Burma. 11 February 1939

The squadron was put at readiness shortly after war was declared but, for the period to December 1941, there was little involvement operationally whilst still based at Seletar. In November and December 1941 detachments were sent to Fisherman's Bend, in Victoria, Australia. Intended replacement aircraft (Bristol Beauforts) for the remaining squadron were not forthcoming and, as part of operations against advancing Japanese forces, the unit's obsolete Vildebeest aircraft were used in strikes against enemy shipping. Because of this, during January 1942, the squadron lost most of its aircraft in engagements with Japanese fighters. Despite several attempts to remain operational as a combined unit along with No. 36 Squadron RAF, as Japan made advances in the Far East theatre, most personnel eventually became prisoners of war and the squadron records were lost.

On 15 December 1942, No. 100 Squadron RAF proper was re-formed in the UK, at RAF Grimsby, near Waltham, as a night-time heavy bomber squadron and was part of No. 1 Group RAF, RAF Bomber Command. In January 1943, the squadron received the first of its new complement of Avro Lancasters; the first operation of the squadron was on 4 March 1943 against a U-boat base at St Nazaire. A few days later the squadron was involved in a raid against Nuremberg in Germany and from then on, as part of Bomber Command's strategic role against Germany, took part in every major raid.

At the end of 1943, No. 100 Squadron had completed the second largest number of successful operations of units within No. 1 Group Bomber Command and had the lowest 'loss' rate. On the night of 16/17 December 1943, the squadron received orders to attack Berlin. The raid became known as 'Black Thursday' as Bomber Command lost 25 aircraft on the raid and 28 in crashes at fog-shrouded airfields. That night, No. 100 Squadron lost their commanding officer, David Holford, who crashed landed approaching RAF Grimsby. On the night of 5 June 1944, the squadron bombed heavy gun batteries in support of the D-Day invasion.

For the last month of the war, the squadron moved to Elsham Wolds in Lincolnshire. In the latter stages of the war and post-war, the squadron was involved in the humanitarian Operations Manna and Exodus. At the end of December 1945 the squadron moved to RAF Scampton, being the last squadron on that station to operate the Avro Lancaster The squadron then departed for RAF Lindholme in May, 1946.

=== Cold War ===
Between 1946 and 1950 No. 100 Squadron was based at RAF Hemswell operating Avro Lancasters and later Avro Lincolns. The squadron left Hemswell in 1950, relocating to Malaysia where it was involved with Operations Firedog and Musgrave. In January 1954, the unit deployed to Eastleigh in Kenya during the Mau Mau Uprising. Returning two months later, the squadron was re-equipped with English Electric Canberras, moving to Wittering in Cambridgeshire. It was disbanded on 1 September 1959 but re-formed at Wittering on 1 May 1962, equipped with Handley Page Victor B.2s, which, from early 1964, carried the Blue Steel missile nuclear weapon.

=== Target Facilities role ===
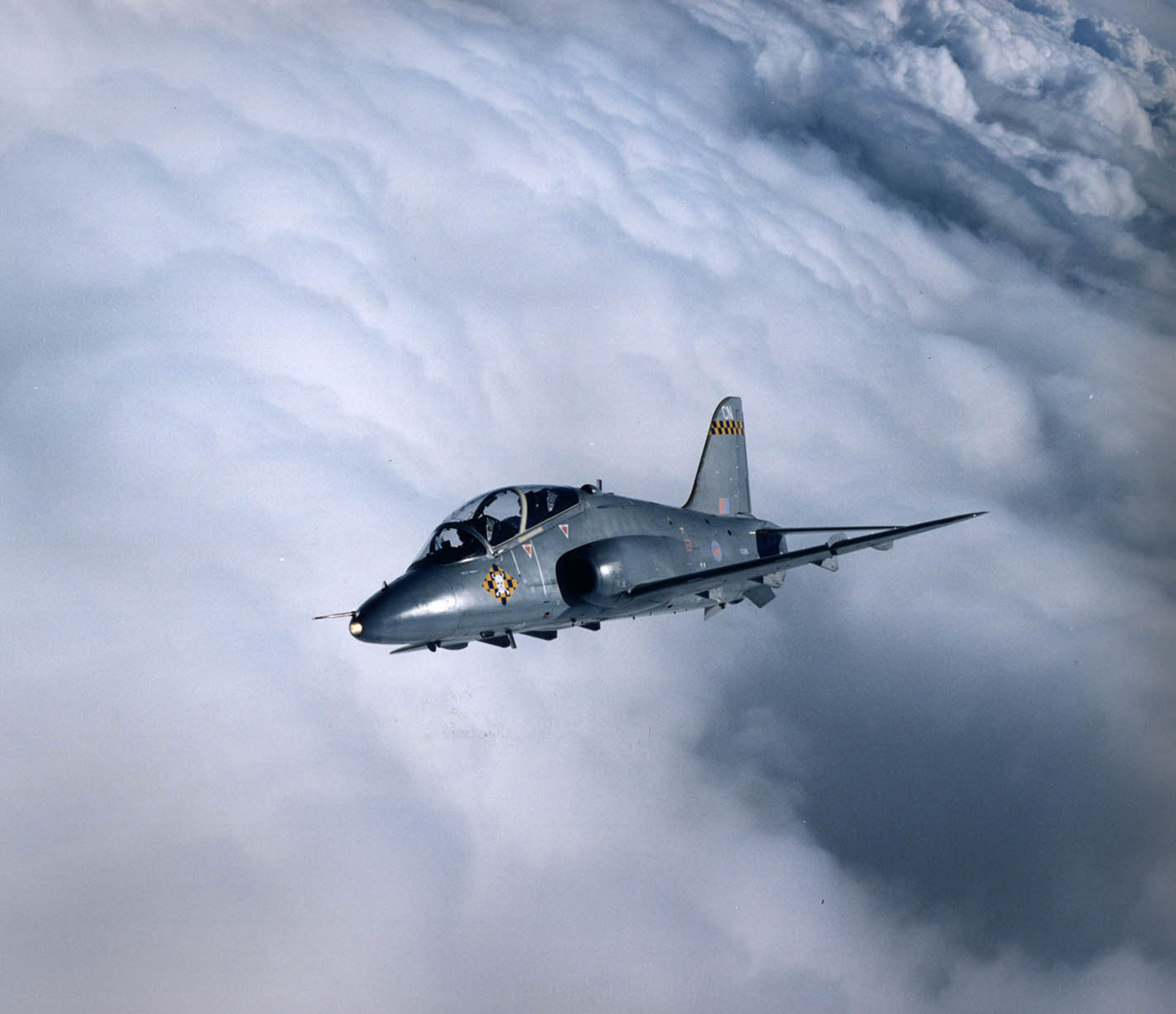
100 Squadron Hawk over Yorkshire, the flag can be seen below the cockpit.

Disbanded again on 30 September 1968, the squadron was re-formed as a target facilities unit in 1972, utilising Canberra aircraft at RAF West Raynham, in Norfolk. No. 100 Sqn combined with Nos. 85 and 98 Squadrons and operated 26 Canberra aircraft from RAF Marham before moving in 1982 to RAF Wyton in Cambridgeshire. In 1991, the squadron converted to the Hawker Siddeley Hawk T1, which are now used for training and front-line support roles. On 31 August 1994, the squadron moved to RAF Finningley in South Yorkshire. After the news that RAF Finningley would be shut, No. 100 Squadron moved without its ground crew to RAF Leeming.

=== Flying training ===
In January 2019, it was announced that, as No. 100 Squadron has a degree of spare capacity in terms of its operations, it would take on an additional role of fast jet flying training. This was undertaken owing to limited capacity in the RAF's existing operation using the Hawk T2 aircraft, and came three years after fast jet training using the Hawk T1 was officially ended with the disbanding of No. 208 Squadron in 2016.

The aircraft's role was to be replaced by the Air Support to Defence Operational Training (ASDOT) programme, which was intended to provide aggressor training to all three British armed services. However, in March 2019, the ASDOT programme was cancelled. The squadron was expected to retire its Hawk T1 aircraft in 2027, however, an announcement in July 2021 confirmed that apart from the Red Arrows, all other Hawk T1 aircraft in the British military would be retired by 31 March 2022. As a result, No. 100 Squadron disbanded on 31 March 2022.

== Notable personnel ==
- Grahame Christie, initial officer commanding, later British air attaché in Berlin (1927–30).
- Wing Commander R V McIntyre, commanding officer of the squadron from April to November 1943. Awarded the DFC after completing a successful bomb-drop over Bochum on 13 May 1943, despite the aircraft having lost two engines to flak hits over Cologne. On return, McIntyre brought the aircraft in to RAF Coltishall, Norfolk for a successful crash landing.
- Peter J. M. Squires, officer commanding from April 2009 to April 2011
- Rory Underwood, former England Rugby Union player

== Squadron flag ==
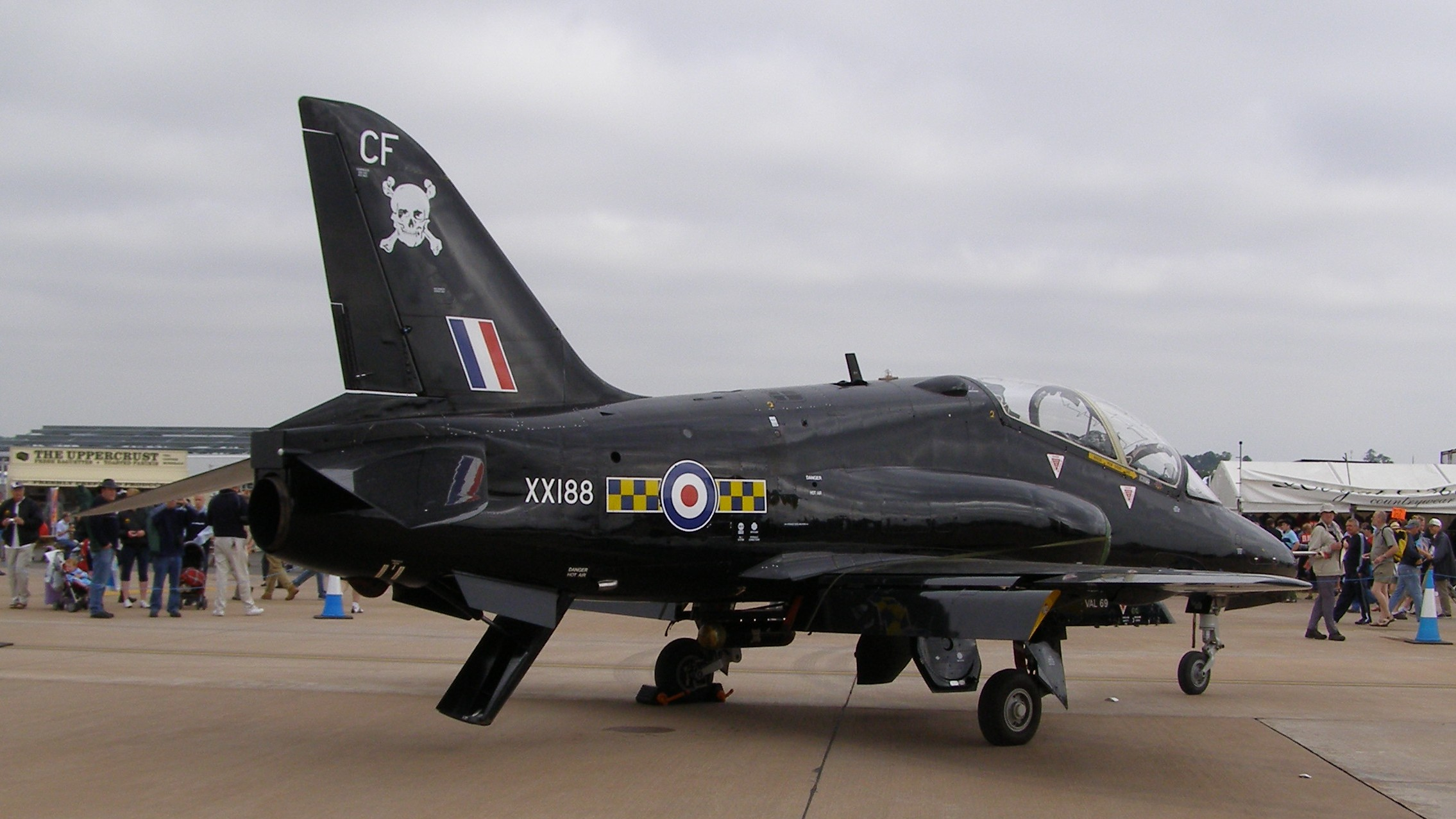
A 100 Squadron Hawk T1 in 2006

The squadron flag which depicts a skull and crossbones was apparently stolen from a French brothel in 1918. It was later embellished with the squadron name and the motto Blood and Bones. The original flag disintegrated while being looked after by a Flight Lieutenant Trillwood during his time as a Japanese prisoner of war. The flag was originally dark maroon in colour but was replaced by a black flag after the war. Following the 90th anniversary of the squadron, a replica of the original flag was presented to the squadron by Arthur White, a navigator with the squadron during the Second World War, in 2008.

== Aircraft operated ==
Aircraft operated included:

- Royal Aircraft Factory B.E.2c (February 1917 – January 1918)
- Royal Aircraft Factory F.E.2b (March 1917 – August 1918)
- Royal Aircraft Factory B.E.2e (April 1917 – August 1917)
- Royal Aircraft Factory F.E.2c (January 1918 – August 1918)
- Handley Page 0/400 (August 1918 – September 1919)
- Bristol F.2b Fighter (February 1920 – March 1922)
- Airco DH.9A (February 1920 – June 1921)
- Avro 504K (February 1922 – May 1924)
- Vickers Vimy (February 1922 – June 1923)
- Fairey Fawn Mk.II/Mk.III (May 1924 – December 1926)
- Hawker Horsley Mk.I/Mk.II (August 1926 – April 1933)
- Vickers Vildebeest Mk.I (November 1932 – September 1933)
- Vickers Vildebeest Mk.II (August 1933 – January 1941)
- Vickers Vildebeest Mk.III (December 1937 – February 1942)
- Bristol Beaufort Mk.I (December 1941 – January 1942)
- Avro Lancaster Mk.I/Mk.III (December 1942 – May 1946)
- Avro Lincoln B.2 (May 1946 – April 1954)
- English Electric Canberra B.2 (April 1954 – September 1959; February 1972 – September 1991)
- English Electric Canberra B.6 (August 1956 – September 1959)
- English Electric Canberra PR.7 (August 1956 – June 1957; June 1982 – December 1991)
- English Electric Canberra B(I).8 (August 1956 – September 1959)
- Handley Page Victor B.2 (June 1962 – June 1964)
- Handley Page Victor B.2R (March 1963 – September 1968)
- English Electric Canberra T.19 (February 1972 – July 1980)
- English Electric Canberra E.15 (February 1976 – September 1991)
- English Electric Canberra TT.18 (January 1982 – December 1991)
- British Aerospace Hawk T.1/T.1A (September 1991 – March 2022)

== Battle honours ==
No. 100 Squadron has received the following battle honours. Those marked with an asterisk (*) may be emblazoned on the squadron standard.

- Western Front (1917–1918)
- Ypres (1917)*
- Somme (1918)*
- Independent Force and Germany (1918)*
- Malaya (1941–1942)*
- Fortress Europe (1943–1944)*
- Biscay Ports (1943–1945)
- Ruhr (1943–1945)
- Berlin (1943–1945)*
- German Ports (1943–1945)
- Baltic (1943–1945)
- France and Germany (1944–1945)
- Normandy (1944)*
- Walcheren

== See also ==
- List of Royal Air Force aircraft squadrons
