= Lightning Force HQ =

Lightning Force Headquarters
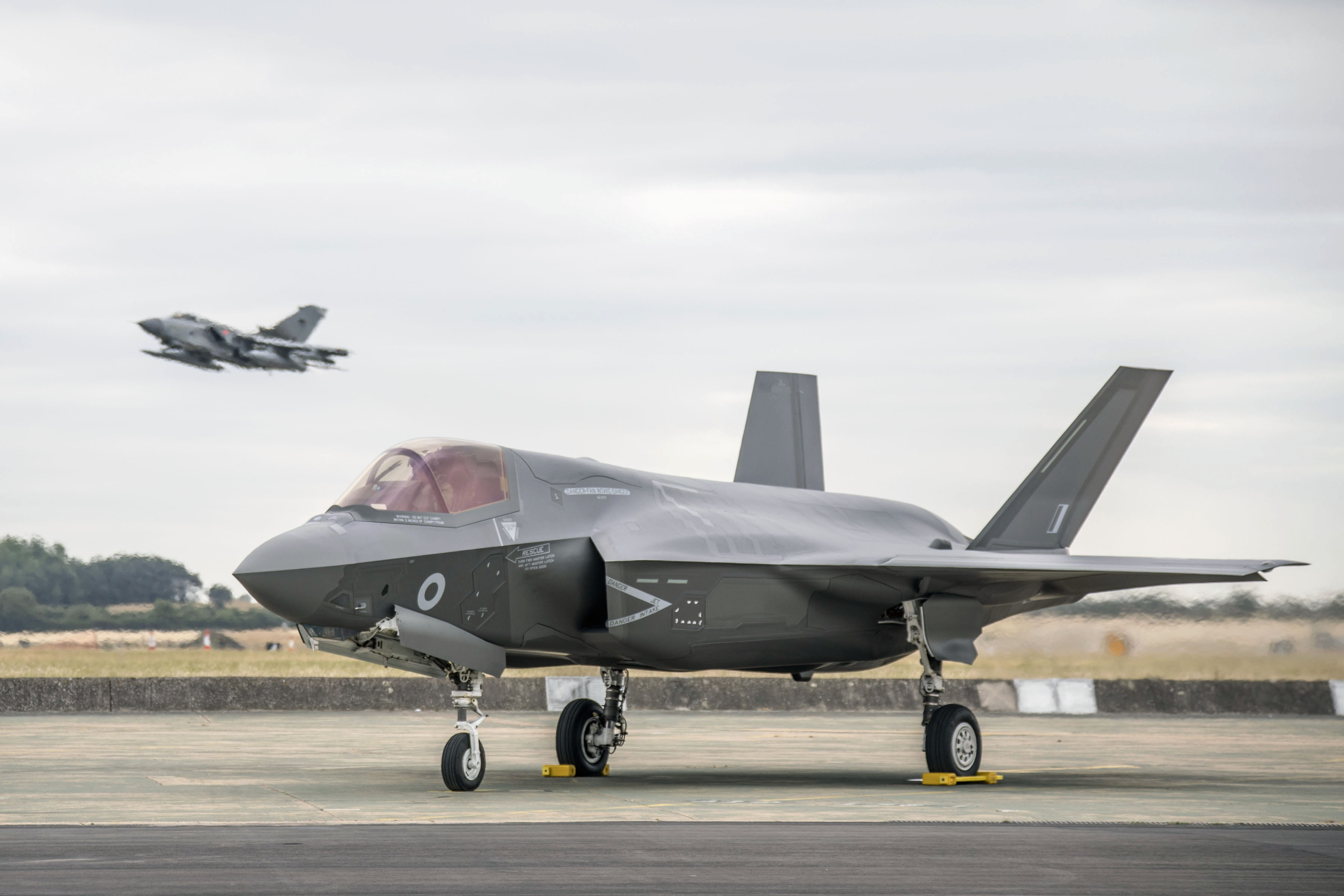
- F-35B Lightning of 617 Squadron
- Active: 2018 – disestablished before 2021
- Country: United Kingdom
- Branch: Royal Air Force; Royal Navy
- Type: Force headquarters
- Role: Coordination of UK F-35B Lightning operations
- Part of: No. 1 Group (RAF)
- Location: RAF Marham, Norfolk
- Aircraft: F-35B Lightning

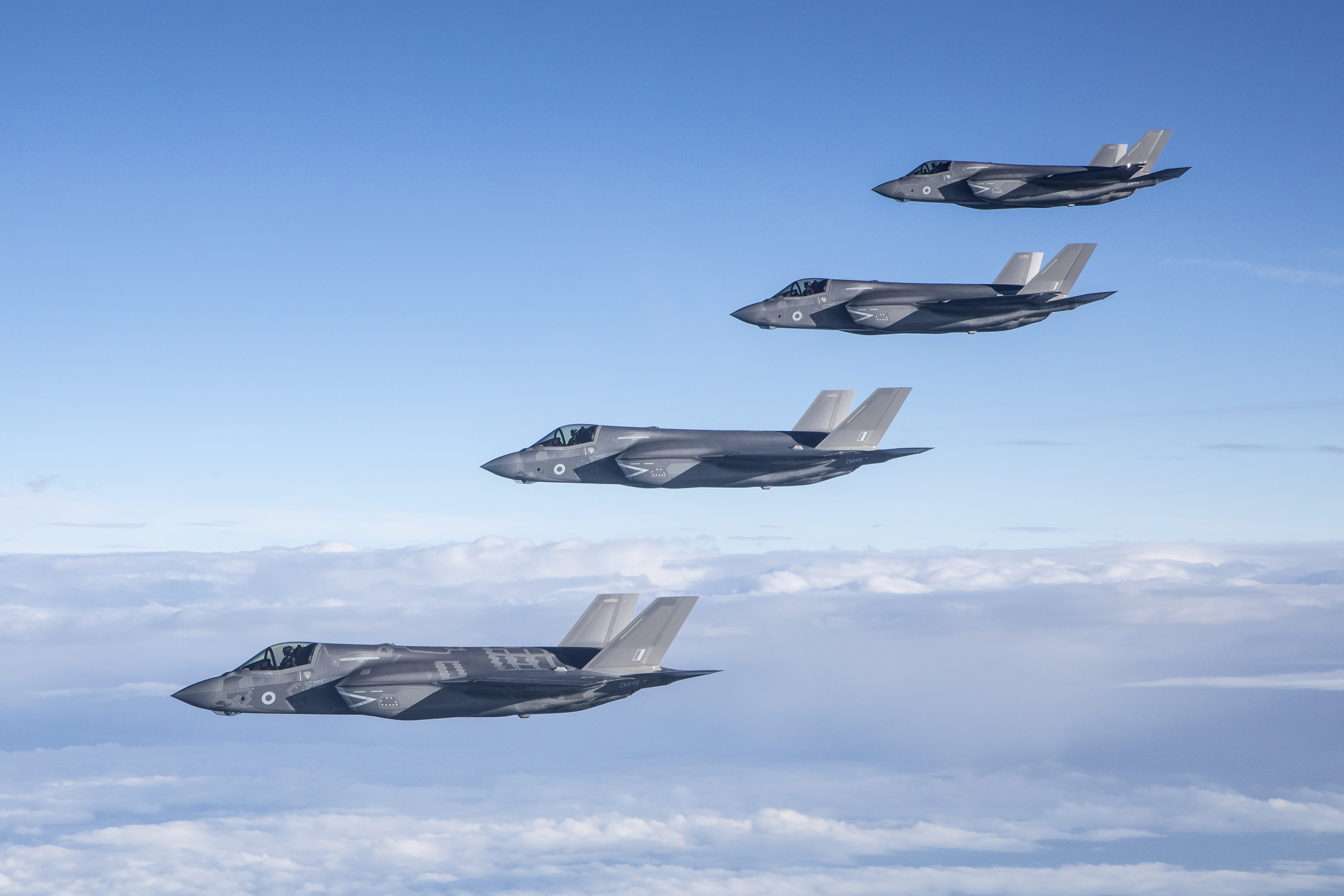
The first four Lightnings of 617 Squadron on their delivery flight to RAF Marham in June 2018

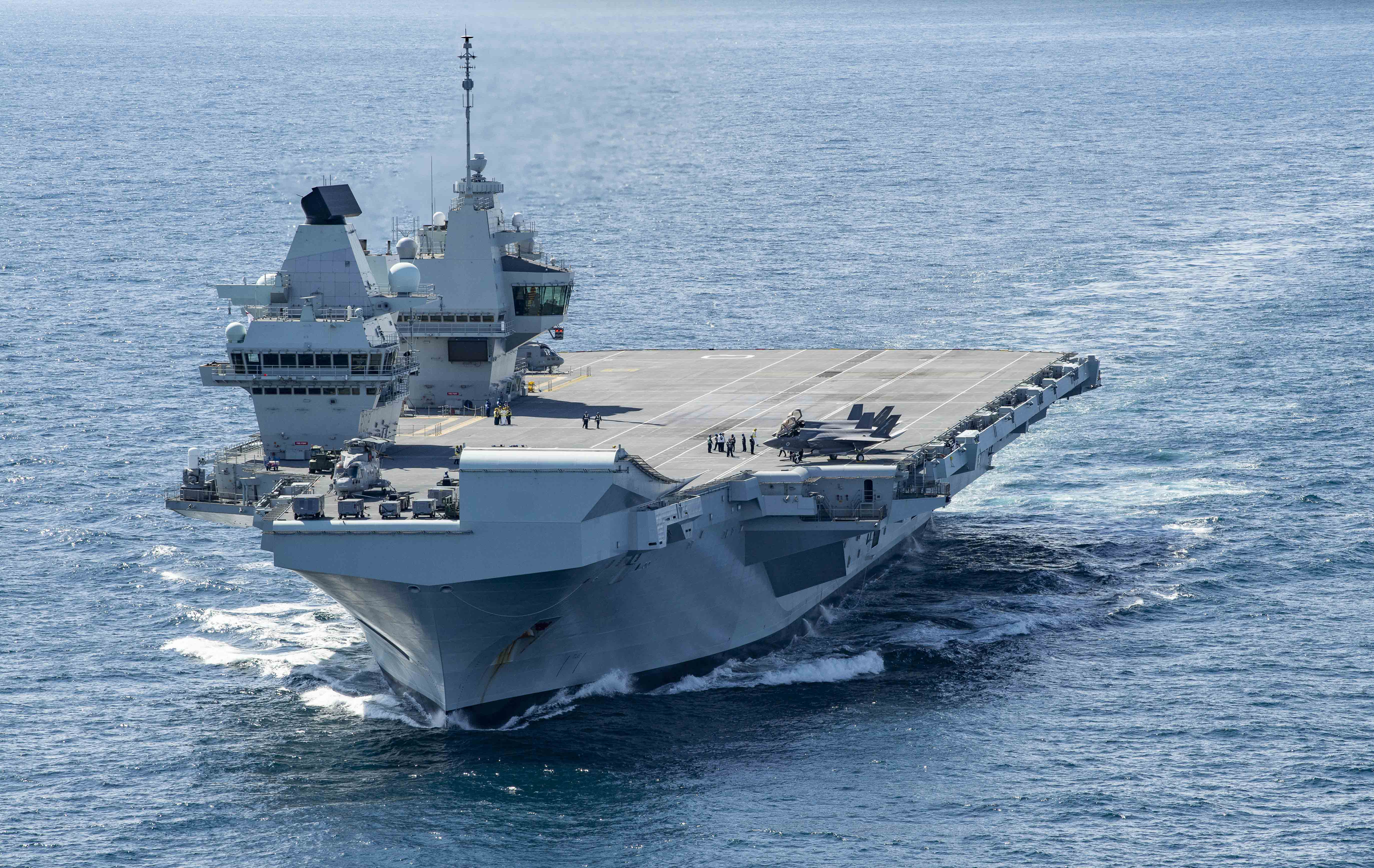
British F-35s operating from HMS Queen Elizabeth for the first time, October 2019

The Lightning Force HQ was the organisation controlling the operations of the Lockheed Martin F-35B Lightning aircraft of the Fleet Air Arm and Royal Air Force. Following on from the principles developed in the operation of the UK's previous STOVL aircraft, the Harrier, the formation is a joint organisation falling under RAF Air Command.

An FOI(A) answer in June 2021 made it clear that the Lightning Force had been superseded by the Combat Air Force.

== History ==
The Lightning Force concept was established during the planning stages for the introduction into UK service of the F-35B (the Joint Combat Aircraft), taking the idea that had previously been put in place for the operation of the Harrier. This saw the units of both the Fleet Air Arm and Royal Air Force amalgamated under a single command structure, with crews of both services intermixing in all units. Initially, two operational squadrons were formed to operate the F-35; in July 2013, 617 Squadron was announced as the first operational F-35 squadron, while in September 2013, 809 Naval Air Squadron became the first Fleet Air Arm squadron. These would be tasked primarily with operating from the Royal Navy's new Queen Elizabeth-class aircraft carriers, as well as from deployed air bases. The intention had been to form two further squadrons, one each from the Fleet Air Arm and RAF, as well as an Operational Conversion Unit, which was formed as 207 Squadron in August 2019.

The Lightning Force was formed as a command organisation in October 2015. In the summer of 2018, 617 Squadron began the process of bringing its new aircraft across the Atlantic to the home base of the new Lightning Force, RAF Marham in Norfolk. The first four aircraft made the transit on 7 June 2018, with another five following in August. In October 2018, HMS Queen Elizabeth undertook the first trial operations of F-35s during her deployment to the United States. 617 Squadron is planned to declare initial operating capability for land based operations by the end of 2018, before beginning carrier trials. 809 Naval Air Squadron had been intended to reform by 2023. Two further operational squadrons, one as part of the RAF and the other in the Fleet Air Arm, were also due to be formed. However, in April 2022 it was indicated that the number of frontline operational squadrons would likely be reduced to three, each with 12 to 16 aircraft. The formation of 809 Naval Air Squadron was also likely to be delayed until at least 2026 and the third squadron might not form before 2030.

However, 809 NAS formally stood-up at RAF Marham, Norfolk, on 8 December 2023 and is expected to be "deployable" in 2025. Initial operating capability was now anticipated by December 1, 2024.

In May 2019, 617 Squadron took six of its aircraft to RAF Akrotiri in Cyprus, the first time the United Kingdom had sent the F-35 on an overseas deployment. This was undertaken to test the capabilities of the F-35, its crews and support structures on an overseas tour. During this deployment, the aircraft undertook their first operational missions, being used on a total of 14 armed reconnaissance overflights of Syria and Iraq as part of Operation Shader.

In October 2019, Lightnings of 17 Squadron became the first UK-owned examples to begin operating from HMS Queen Elizabeth during the ship's Westlant 19 deployment to the United States, which saw the second-stage flying trials undertaken to continue preparations for the eventual declaration of carrier strike capability. This was followed in early 2020 by 207 Squadron undertaking its first period of carrier qualifications, which was also the first time that the Lightning had operated from a carrier in UK waters. In 2021, Queen Elizabeth sailed on her first operational deployment, with eighteen F-35s including as part of the ship's air group - of these, eight were British aircraft operated by 617 Squadron, with the remainder from VMFA-211, a squadron of the United States Marine Corps. While the ship was transiting through the Mediterranean towards the Suez Canal, F-35s from 617 Squadron were launched on strike missions against targets in Syria. An RAF Lightning was lost during a launch accident while the carrier was in the Mediterranean during its return to the UK.

According to an FOI(A) answered in June 2021, squadrons with the F-35 report to HQ Combat Air Force based at RAF Coningsby. This force in turn reports to No. 1 Group RAF.

== Lightning Force HQ units ==
- No. 17 Squadron RAF (2013-)
- No. 207 Squadron RAF (2019-)
- No. 617 Squadron RAF (2018-)
