= Fairey Fawn =

British single-engine light bomber of the 1920s

Fawn
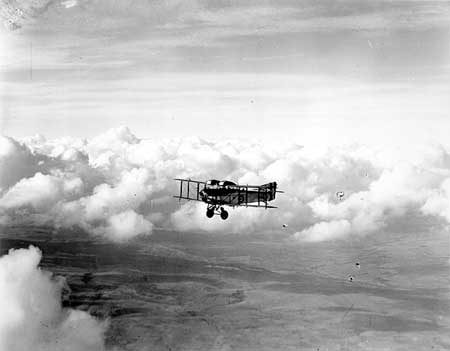

General information
- Type: Two-seat day light bomber
- National origin: United Kingdom
- Manufacturer: Fairey Aviation
- Designer: F Duncanson
- Primary user: Royal Air Force
- Number built: 75

History
- Introduction date: 1924
- First flight: 1923
- Retired: 1929

The Fairey Fawn was a British single-engine light bomber of the 1920s. It was designed as a replacement for the Airco DH.9A and served with the Royal Air Force between 1924 and 1929.

== Development ==
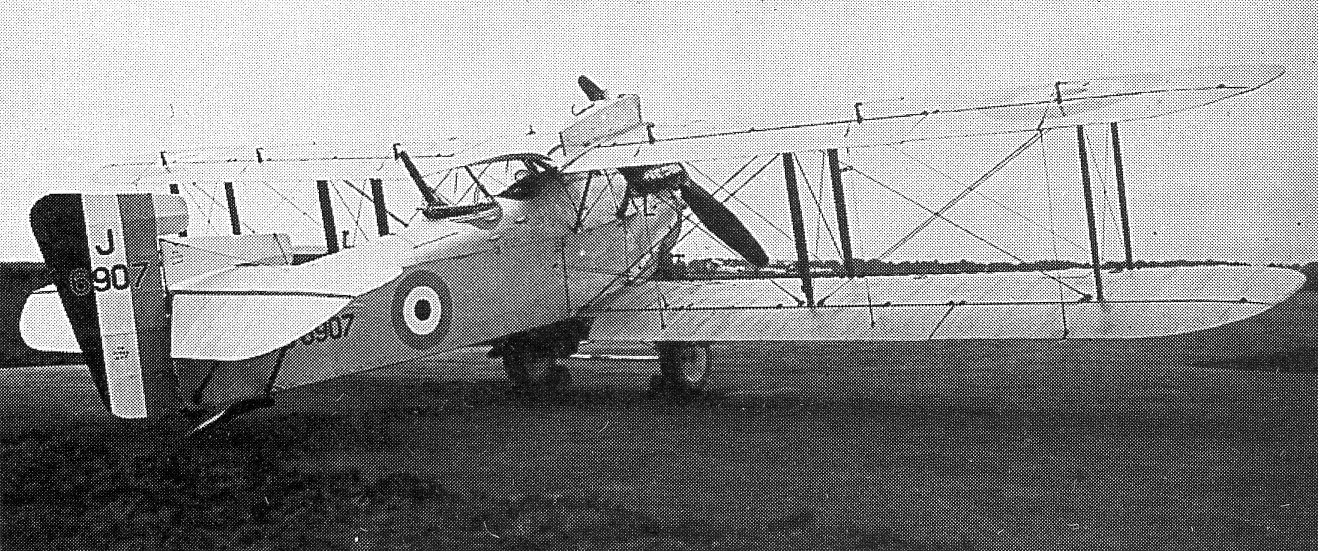
First prototype Fawn with short fuselage and single tank

The Fairey Fawn was designed by F Duncanson of Fairey Aviation as a replacement for the Airco DH.9A in the light day-bomber role, to meet the requirements of Specification 5/21 for an aircraft for reconnaissance and army cooperation duties. It was a development of the Fairey Pintail floatplane, powered by a Napier Lion engine.

The first of three prototypes flew on 8 March 1923. The second and third prototypes were fitted with lengthened fuselages to improve stability, and this was adapted for the production version. The Fawn was fitted with fuel tanks above the top wing in order to meet Air Ministry safety requirements. These tanks posed a hazard to the pilots if the aircraft overturned on landing.

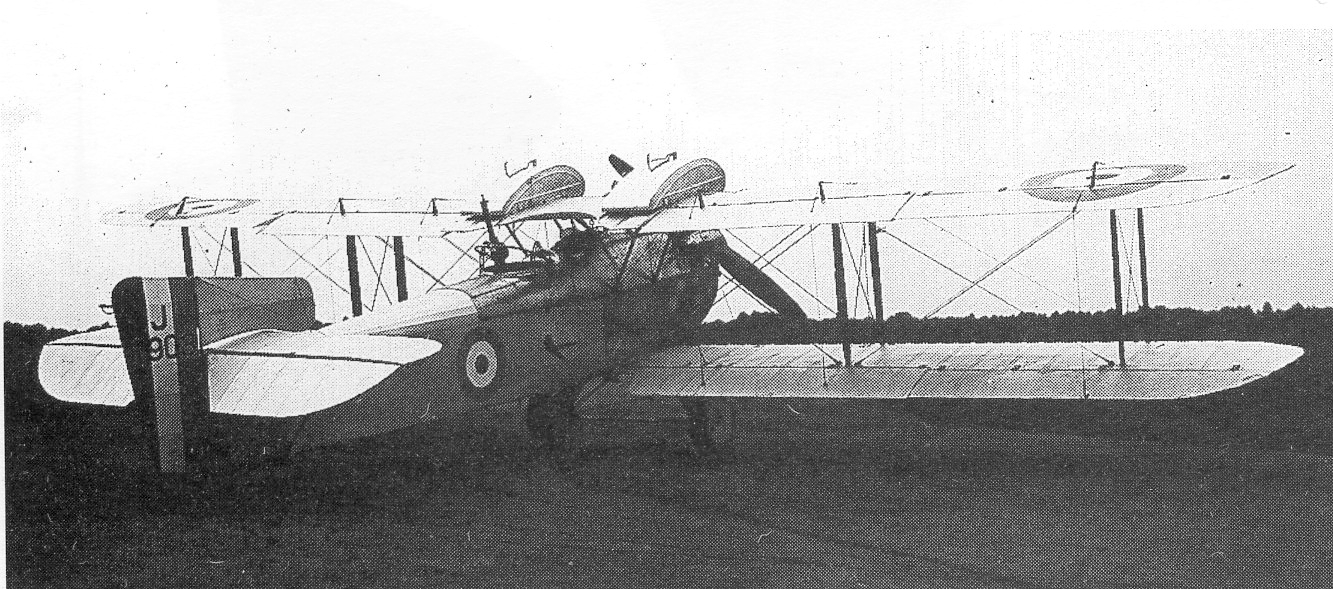
First prototype Fawn with lengthened fuselage, revised tail and overhead tanks; the basis for the production Fawn Mk II

A revised specification 20/23 was issued which added the bomber role. Two prototypes and 48 production Fawn Mk II aircraft were ordered against the new specification in August 1923 to re-equip the home based DH.9A squadrons of the RAF, although the first two production aircraft were completed as short fuselage Fawn Mk Is. The remainder of this order were full production long fuselage Fawn Mk IIs. The Fawn Mk III was fitted with a more powerful 468 hp (350 kW) Lion V engine, while the Fawn Mk IV was fitted with a supercharged Lion VI engine.

== Operational history ==
The Fawn entered service with 12 Squadron in March 1924, equipping two further regular squadrons, 11 Squadron and 100 Squadron. Despite the fact that the Fawn was originally intended to replace all the home-based DH.9A squadrons, four more squadrons continued to be equipped with the DH.9A for several more years before being replaced by other types.

The Fawn was not a popular aircraft in RAF service, having little better performance than the aircraft it replaced, and having a poor view for the pilot owing to the bulky Lion engine.

In 1926 the Fawn was replaced in the three regular squadrons by the Hawker Horsley and the Fairey Fox. The aircraft freed up were used to equip two Special Reserve and Auxiliary Air Force squadrons, these remaining in service until 1929.

== Variants ==
Fawn Mk I
J6907 Prototype Short fuselage – 450 hp (340 kW) Lion II engine, later converted to Mk III
J6908 Prototype built with Long Fuselage
J6909 Prototype built with Long Fuselage
Two further Mk I aircraft were built as part of the main Mk II production batch.
Fawn Mk II
J6990 Prototype to Specification 20/23 ordered in February 1923
J6991 Prototype to Specification 20/23 ordered in February 1923
Long Fuselage – 450 hp (340 kW) Lion II engine. Main production type – 48 production aircraft built.
Fawn Mk III
468 hp (349 kW) Lion V engine. 20 built.
Fawn Mk IV
Twelve Mk IIIs were converted with supercharged Lion VI engines for a proposed Mk IV variant but the trial was abandoned and the Mk Iv designation was not used.

== Operators ==
United Kingdom

- Royal Air Force
  - No. 11 Squadron RAF – April 1924 – May 1927
  - No. 12 Squadron RAF – May 1924 – December 1926
  - No. 100 Squadron RAF – May 1924 – December 1926
  - No 503 (County of Lincoln) Squadron RAF Special Reserve – October 1926 – June 1929
  - No 602 (City of Glasgow) Squadron RAF Auxiliary Air Force – September 1927 – October 1929

== Specifications (Fawn Mk III) ==
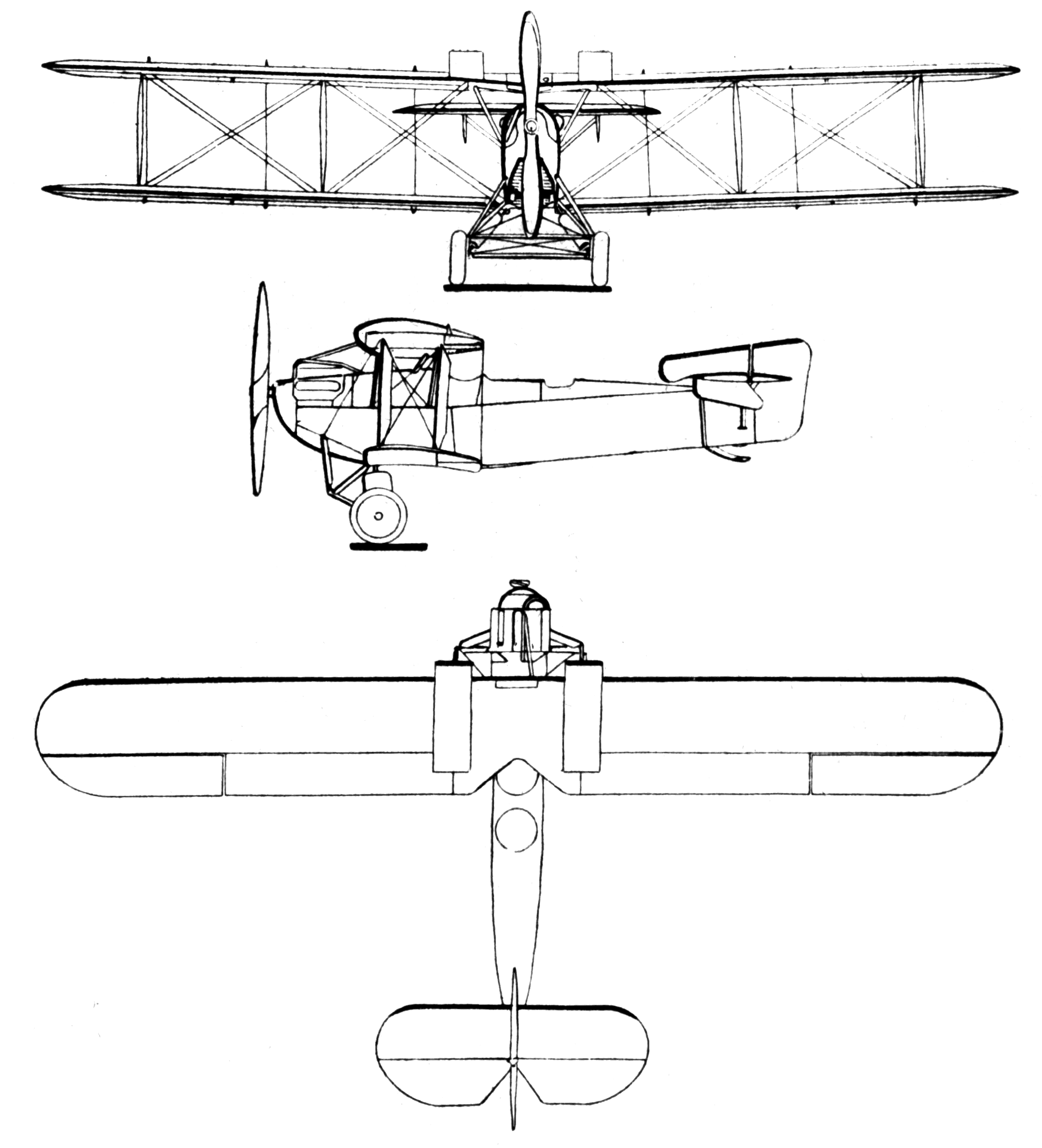
Fairey Fawn 3-view drawing from Les Ailes March 25, 1926

Data from The British Bomber since 1914

General characteristics

- Crew: Two
- Length: 32 ft 1 in (9.78 m)
- Wingspan: 49 ft 11 in (15.21 m)
- Height: 11 ft 11 in (3.63 m)
- Wing area: 550 sq ft (51 m^{2})
- Empty weight: 3,481 lb (1,579 kg)
- Gross weight: 5,834 lb (2,646 kg)
- Powerplant: 1 × Napier Lion 12-cylinder, water-cooled broad arrow engine, 468 hp (349 kW)

Performance

- Maximum speed: 114 mph (183 km/h, 99 kn) at sea level
- Range: 650 mi (1,050 km, 560 nmi)
- Service ceiling: 13,850 ft (4,220 m)
- Time to altitude: 6 min 30 sec to 5,000 ft (1,500 m)

Armament

- Guns:
  - 1 × fixed, forward-firing .303 in (7.7 mm) Vickers machine gun
  - 1 or 2 × .303 in (7.7 mm) Lewis Gun on Scarff ring in rear cockpit
- Bombs: Up to 460 lb (210 kg) bombs underwing.

== See also ==
Related development

- Fairey Pintail

Aircraft of comparable role, configuration, and era

- Airco DH.9A
- Hawker Horsley
- Fairey Fox

Related lists

- List of aircraft of the Royal Air Force
