= David Holford (RAF officer) =

Royal Air Force officer

Wing Commander David William Holford DSO DFC
- Born: 21 February 1921; Kingston upon Thames, England
- Died: 17 December 1943 (Note: The CWGC list the death as 16/17 December 1943) (aged 22); Kelstern, England
- Military career
- Allegiance: United Kingdom
- Branch: Royal Air Force
- Service years: 1938–1943
- Rank: Wing Commander
- Service number: 41704
- Commands: No. 100 Squadron
- Conflicts: The Second World War; Atlantic War; Channel Dash; Battle of Berlin †
- Awards: Distinguished Service Order; Distinguished Flying Cross; Mentioned in Despatches

Wing Commander David William Holford DSO DFC (21 February 1921 – 17 December 1943) was a Royal Air Force officer who was the youngest bomber squadron commanding officer in RAF history. He was killed after crashing his Lancaster in thick fog near Kelstern following an operation to bomb Berlin (the infamous Black Thursday).

== RAF career ==
Holford was inspired to join the RAF when his uncle Air Com D'Arcy Greig competed in the 1929 Schneider Trophy in a Napier-engined Supermarine S5. Greig gave him his leather flying helmet and his destiny was cast (source, his widow Joan Holford).

Holford joined the RAF in 1938 aged 17. After pilot training he had become a Wellington bomber pilot with 99 Squadron at RAF Newmarket in March 1940. At Newmarket he flew 11 operations as a second pilot. He flew six missions with Flight Lieutenant Percy Pickard, who portrayed the fictional Squadron Leader Dickson, in the 1941 propaganda film, Target for Tonight.

By June 1940 Holford was captain of his own aircraft and completed a further 15 operations. For nursing a severely damaged aircraft back from an operation he was Mentioned in Despatches and later received the Distinguished Flying Cross (DFC) before a promotion to Flying Officer and becoming an instructor at RAF Bassingbourn.

As a flight lieutenant, Holford was assigned to 103 Squadron at RAF Elsham Wolds, flying 29 operations, including flying a Wellington on a daylight attack against the fleeing German battleships Scharnhorst and Gneisenau on 12 February 1942, during what became known as the Channel Dash. For his actions that day, Holford was awarded the Distinguished Service Order (DSO) and promoted to squadron leader aged just 21.

Holford flew the four-engined Halifax bomber and trained and flew operations with 103 Squadron before converting to Lancasters. After marrying Joan, a WAAF RAF Intelligence Officer, left Elsham Wolds for a flight commander position at RAF Lindholme. His still flew actively, attacking Berlin on 17 January 1943.

Just four days before his 22nd birthday in February 1943, Holford was promoted to wing commander, the youngest man to hold this rank in Bomber Command and one of the youngest in the history of the RAF.

On 21 November he was posted to Waltham to take command of 100 Squadron. On 16 December 1943, 100 Squadron received orders to attack Berlin. Holford piloted a Lancaster for the attack. The raid became known as 'Black Thursday' as 25 aircraft were lost on the raid and 28 crashed (and four abandoned as the crew baled out) in England where airfields had become fog-bound. Seeking to land at RAF Grimsby, Holford's Lancaster flew into the ground near Kelstern with only the wireless operator and tail gunner surviving.

== Honours and awards ==
- 22 October 1940 – Pilot Officer David William Holford (41704) awarded the Distinguished Flying Cross.
- 11 August 1942 – Acting Squadron Leader David William Holford, DFC (41704), No. 103 Squadron is awarded the Distinguished Service Order.
