= No. 502 Squadron RAuxAF =

Reserve non-flying squadron of the Royal Air Force

No. 502 (Ulster) Squadron RAuxAF
- Active: 15 May 1925 – 25 May 1945; 10 May 1946 – 10 March 1957; September 2013 – present
- Country: United Kingdom
- Branch: Royal Air Force
- Part of: RAF Bomber Command (1925–1938, 1946); RAF Coastal Command (1938–1945); RAF Fighter Command (1947–1957)
- Garrison/HQ: Aldergrove Flying Station
- Nickname: Ulster
- Mottos: Latin: Nihil timeo (Translation: "I fear nothing")
- Battle honours: Atlantic, 1939–44; Biscay, 1941–44; Channel & North Sea, 1942–45; Dieppe; Baltic, 1944–45; These honours are all emblazoned on the squadron standard

Commanders
- Honorary Air Commodores: Lord Londonderry; Viscount Brookeborough

Insignia
- Squadron Badge heraldry: A red hand erased The red hand is taken from the arms of Ulster, 502 being the Ulster Auxiliary Squadron. The hand is erased though, instead of couped.
- Squadron Codes: KQ (April 1939 – September 1939); YG (September 1939 – February 1943); V9 (June 1944 – May 1945, 1949–1953); RAC (May 1946–1949)

No. 502 (Ulster) Squadron is a squadron of the Royal Auxiliary Air Force that was reformed in September 2013, and is the oldest active reserve squadron, having been formed in 1925. The squadron took park in anti-submarine patrols and bombing sorties in the Second World War.

== History ==
=== Formation and early years ===
No. 502 squadron was originally formed on 15 May 1925 as No. 502 (Bomber) Squadron, a Special Reserve squadron at RAF Aldergrove, and it was composed of a mixture of regular and reserve personnel. On 1 December 1925 the name No. 502 (Ulster) Squadron was adopted. The squadron operated in the heavy night bomber role and as such it was initially equipped with Vickers Vimys from June 1925, re-equipping with Handley Page Hyderabads in July 1928. Vickers Virginias arrived in December 1931, but in October 1935 the squadron was transferred to the day bomber role for which it received Westland Wallaces, Hawker Hinds arriving in April 1937. Shortly after this, on 1 July 1937, it was transferred to the Auxiliary Air Force, the Special Reserve being disbanded.

=== In Coastal Command ===
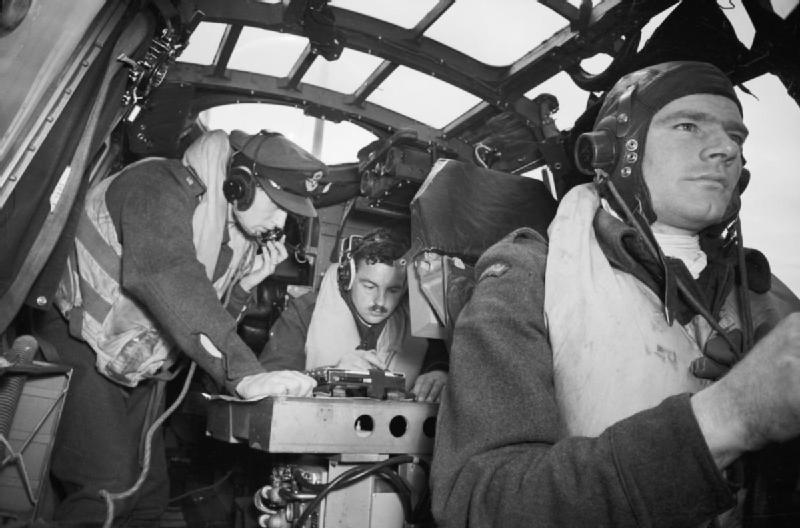
The crew of a Whitley Mk VII of 502 Squadron on an anti-submarine patrol, August 1942

On 28 November 1938, No. 502 (Ulster) Squadron became part of RAF Coastal Command, and was re-equipped with Avro Anson, a twin-engine, multi-role aircraft, in January 1939. When war broke out, the squadron was used to fly maritime patrols in the Atlantic Ocean off the Irish Coast. From October 1940, the Squadron flew with Armstrong Whitworth Whitley, a twin-engined medium bomber. It was reported that on 30 November 1941 the squadron became the first Coastal Command unit to make a successful attack on a U-boat with air-to-surface-vessel radar, sinking U-boat U-206 in the Bay of Biscay. This report has been countered with newer information that the U-206 was more probably sunk by the minefield, "Beech," laid there by the British after August 1940, and that the squadron's attack was actually on U-71, which escaped without loss.

In January 1942, the squadron officially moved to both Norfolk (RAF Docking) and Cornwall, where a maintenance station was set up at RAF St Eval. Until 1944 the squadron's main role was to carry out anti-submarine patrols. In January 1943 conversion to Handley Page Halifax GR.Mk.II, a British four-engined heavy bomber, began, with the first patrol by this type being flown on 12 March. In addition to anti-submarine patrols, now also attacks on enemy shipping off the occupied French coast were made. In September 1944, with the French coast back in Allied hands, the squadron moved to RAF Stornoway in Scotland, to carry out attacks on German shipping off the Norwegian coast, remaining there until the end of the war. It was disbanded on 25 May 1945.

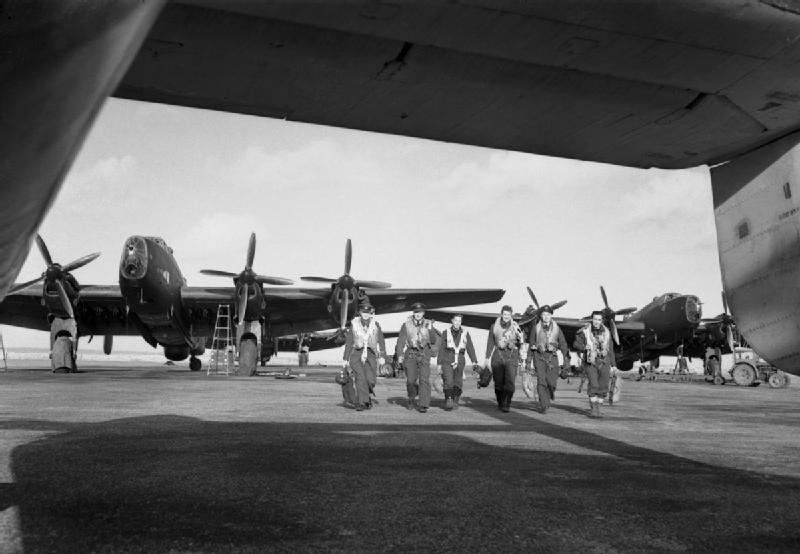
The crew of a Handley Page Halifax of No. 502 Squadron

=== Into the jet age ===
With the reactivation of the Auxiliary Air Force, No. 502 was reformed on 10 May 1946, again at RAF Aldergrove, but now as a light bomber squadron, equipped with de Havilland Mosquito B.25 from July 1946. In December night fighter de Havilland Mosquitoe replaced the bomber variant, but in June 1948 the units of the by now Royal Auxiliary Air Force all converted to the day fighter role, 502 receiving Supermarine Spitfire F.22 fighter aircraft for the purpose. Jet conversion began in January 1951 with the arrival of de Havilland Vampire FB.5, which were supplemented by the FB.9 variant in July 1954. The squadron continued to fly both types until, along with all the flying units of the RAuxAF, it was disbanded on 10 March 1957.

=== Reformation at Aldergrove ===
It was confirmed in September 2013 that No. 502 (Ulster) Squadron has reformed at Aldergrove Flying Station. As a general Squadron its mission is to provide fully trained Royal Auxiliary Air Force personnel, across a wide spectrum of roles, to support current and future worldwide commitments. No. 502 is the oldest of the reserve squadrons, having been formed in 1925, and in 2019, a new standard was awarded to the squadron as the old standard had been awarded in 1939 and was worn out.

== Aircraft operated ==
Aircraft operated by No. 502 Squadron RAF
From	To	Aircraft	Version
June 1925	July 1928	Vickers Vimy	
July 1928	February 1932	Handley Page Hyderabad	
December 1931	October 1935	Vickers Virginia	Mk.X
October 1935	May 1937	Westland Wallace	Mk.I
November 1935	May 1937	Westland Wallace	Mk.II
April 1937	April 1939	Hawker Hind	
January 1939	November 1940	Avro Anson	Mk.I
August 1940	November 1940	Blackburn Botha	Mk.I
September 1940	February 1942	Armstrong Whitworth Whitley	Mk.V
November 1941	February 1943	Armstrong Whitworth Whitley	Mk.VII
January 1943	March 1945	Handley Page Halifax	GR.Mk.II Srs.IA
December 1944	May 1945	Handley Page Halifax	GR.Mks.IIIA, VI
July 1946	December 1947	de Havilland Mosquito	B.25
December 1947	June 1948	de Havilland Mosquito	NF.30
June 1948	January 1951	Supermarine Spitfire	F.22
January 1951	March 1951	de Havilland Vampire	F.3
March 1951	March 1957	de Havilland Vampire	FB.5
July 1954	March 1957	de Havilland Vampire	FB.9

== Squadron bases ==
Bases and airfields used by No. 502 Squadron
From	To	Base	Remark
27 January 1925	27 January 1941	RAF Aldergrove, County Antrim	Detachment at RAF Hooton Park, Cheshire
27 January 1941	12 January 1942	RAF Limavady, County Londonderry	Detachments at RAF Wick, Caithness, Scotland; RAF Chivenor, Devon; RAF St Eval, Cornwall and RAF Reykjavik, Iceland
12 February 1942	22 February 1942	RAF Docking, Norfolk	Detachment at RAF St Eval, Cornwall
22 February 1942	2 March 1943	RAF St Eval, Cornwall	
2 March 1943	25 March 1943	RAF Holmesley South, Hampshire	Detachment at RAF St Eval, Cornwall
25 March 1943	30 June 1943	RAF St Eval, Cornwall	
30 June 1943	10 December 1943	RAF Holmesley South, Hampshire	Detachment at RAF St Eval, Cornwall
10 December 1943	11 September 1944	RAF St Davids, Pembrokeshire, Wales	
11 September 1944	25 May 1945	RAF Stornoway, Western Isles, Scotland	Detachment at RAF Wick, Caithness, Scotland
17 July 1946	10 March 1957	RAF Aldergrove, County Antrim	

== Commanding officers ==
Officers commanding No. 502 Squadron RAF
From	To	Name
May 1925	November 1926	S/Ldr. R.D. Oxland
		W/Cdr. A.C. Wright, AFC
		S/Ldr. C.L. King, MC, DFC
		W/Cdr. F.P. Don
	March 1932	W/Cdr. R.T. Leather, AFC
March 1932	1934	W/Cdr. L.T.N. Gould, MC
1934		W/Cdr. J.C. Russell, DSO
	November 1937	S/Ldr. G.V. Tyrell, MC
November 1937	December 1940	W/Cdr. L.R. Briggs
December 1940	November 1941	W/Cdr. T.C. Cooper
November 1941	September 1942	W/Cdr. F.C. Richardson
September 1942	August 1943	W/Cdr. J.C. Halley, DSO
August 1943	May 1944	W/Cdr. N.M. Bayliss
May 1944	October 1944	W/Cdr. C.A. Maton, DSO, SAAF
October 1944	November 1944	W/Cdr. K.B. Corbould, DFC
November 1944	May 1945	W/Cdr. H.H.C. Holderness, DFC, AFC, DSO
July 1946		S/Ldr. W.H. McGiffin
		S/Ldr. D.F.B. Sheen, DFC & Bar, RAAF
	1956	S/Ldr. N.G. Townsend, DFC
1956	March 1957	S/Ldr. J.H. Pearce

== Notable personnel ==
- Clive Beadon
- John Burrough (rower), killed 26 November 1944.
- William Maxfield (cyclist), killed 27 December 1943.
- Michael Oser Weizmann, son of Chaim Weizmann, who was shot down and reported missing in 1942.
