= Simon Strasdin =

Royal Air Force officer

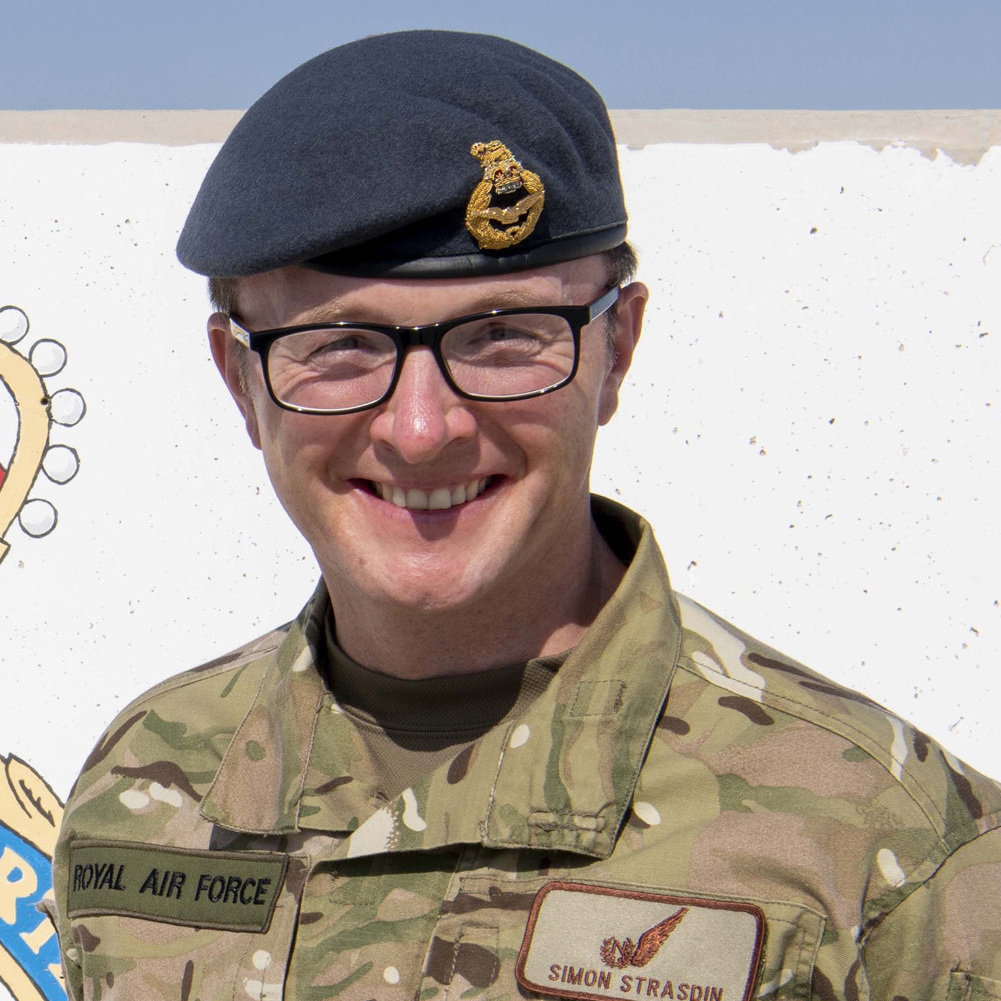
- Strasdin in 2019
- Military career
- Allegiance: United Kingdom
- Branch: Royal Air Force
- Service years: 1992–present
- Rank: Air Vice-Marshal
- Conflicts: War in Afghanistan
- Awards: Commander of the Order of the British Empire

Air Vice-Marshal Simon Robert Strasdin, CBE is a senior Royal Air Force officer who has served as Air Officer Commanding No. 1 Group RAF since August 2026.

== RAF career ==
Strasdin was commissioned into the Royal Air Force in March 1992. After training as a navigator, he was deployed to the middle east during the War in Afghanistan. He became commander of No. 83 Expeditionary Air Group in September 2020, Intelligence, Surveillance, Target Acquisition and Reconnaissance Force Commander in May 2022 and Head of Warfare Development, Joint Warfare, in March 2024. He went on to be Director Joint Warfare at the Ministry of Defence in November 2024 and Air Officer Commanding No. 1 Group RAF in August 2026.

He was appointed an Officer of the Order of the British Empire (OBE) in the 2018 Birthday Honours and advanced to Commander of the Order of the British Empire (CBE) in the 2022 Special Honours.

Military offices
Preceded by Mark Jackson	Air Officer Commanding No. 1 Group; 2026–present	Incumbent
