= Mark Jackson (RAF officer) =

Royal Air Force officer

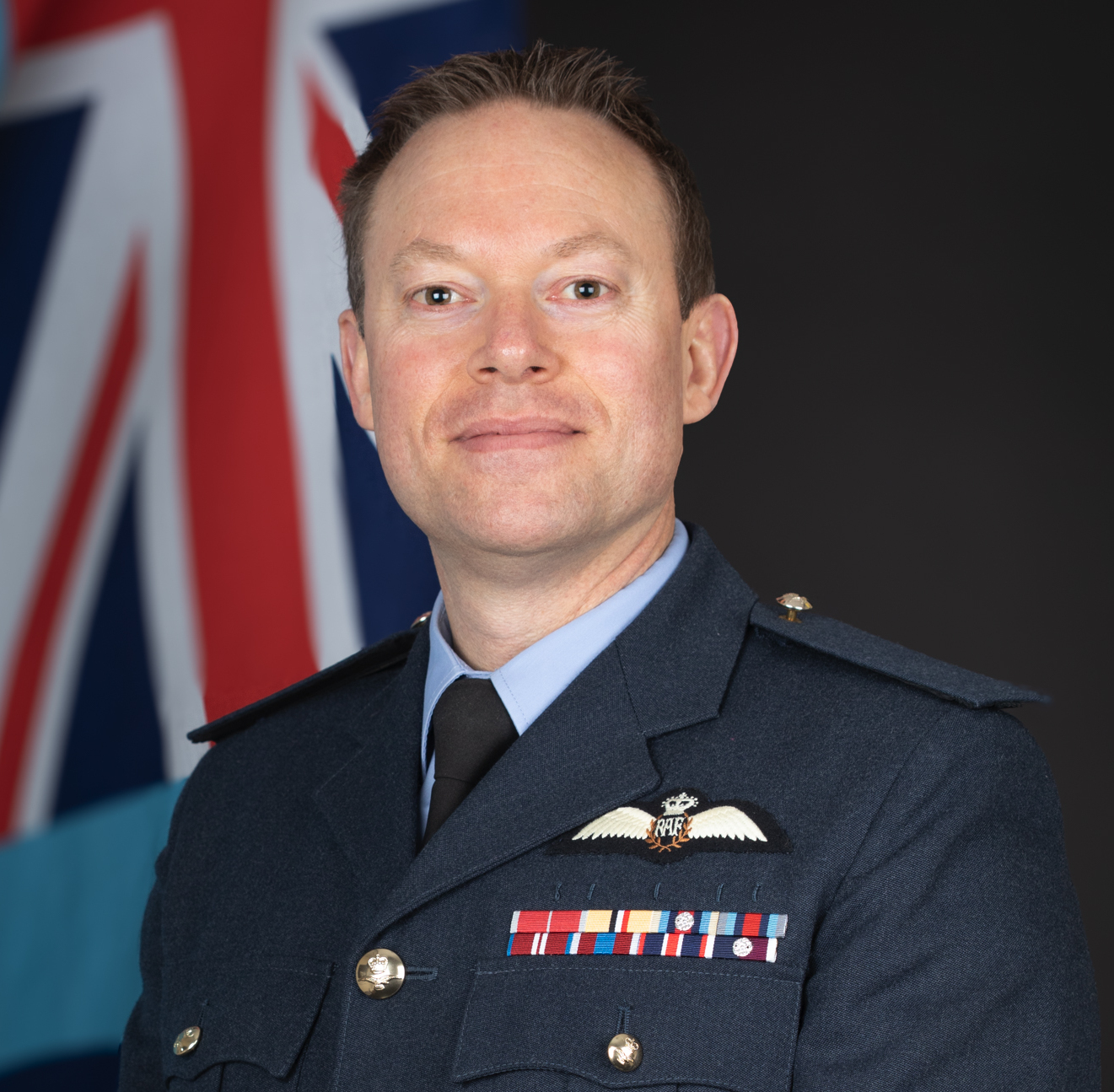
- Jackson in 2025
- Military career
- Allegiance: United Kingdom
- Branch: Royal Air Force
- Service years: 1999–present
- Rank: Air Vice-Marshal
- Conflicts: Iraq War; War in Afghanistan; War against the Islamic State
- Awards: Officer of the Order of the British Empire

Air Vice-Marshal Mark George Jackson, OBE is a senior Royal Air Force officer who has served as Assistant Chief of the Defence Staff (Military Strategy) since August 2026.

== RAF career ==
Jackson was commissioned into the Royal Air Force on 30 May 1999. He became officer commanding No. 13 Squadron and, in that capacity, saw action during Operation Shader (the War against the Islamic State). He became Assistant Chief of Staff, Operations in September 2024, and was Air Officer Commanding, No. 1 Group from March 2025 to August 2026. From August 2026 he is Assistant Chief of the Defence Staff (Military Strategy).

He was appointed an Officer of the Order of the British Empire (OBE) in the 2021 Birthday Honours.

Military offices
Preceded by Mark Flewin	Air Officer Commanding No. 1 Group; 2025–2026	Succeeded by Simon Strasdin
Preceded by Mark Flewin	Assistant Chief of the Defence Staff (Military Strategy); 2026–present	Incumbent
