= No. 1 Group RAF =

Royal Air Force operations group

No. 1 Group
- Group badge
- Active: 1918–1926; 1927–1939; 1940–present
- Country: United Kingdom
- Branch: Royal Air Force
- Type: Group headquarters
- Role: Frontline air operations
- Part of: RAF Air Command
- Headquarters: RAF High Wycombe
- Motto: Swift to attack

Commanders
- Air Officer Commanding: Air Vice-Marshal Simon Strasdin

No. 1 Group, Royal Air Force is one of the force's five groups. In the mid-2020s, the group is referred to as the Air Combat Group, as it controls the RAF's combat fast-jet aircraft and has airfields in the UK, as well as RAF Support Unit Goose Bay at CFB Goose Bay in Canada. The group headquarters is at RAF High Wycombe, Buckinghamshire.

The current Air Officer Commanding No 1 Group is Air Vice-Marshal Simon Strasdin, who took up the post in August 2026.

== History ==
=== First World War ===
No. 1 Group was originally formed on April 1918 in No. 1 Area, which was renamed the South-Eastern Area on 8 May 1918, Southern Area on 20 September 1919 and Inland Area on 1 April 1920.

The Group was renumbered as No. 6 Group on 19 May 1924 at RAF Kenley, and was reformed on the same day at RAF Kidbrooke. Two years later on 12 April 1926 the Group disappeared from the order of battle by being renumbered as No. 21 Group.

The next year the Group was reformed on 25 August 1927 by the renaming of Air Defence Group. This designation lasted until 1936 when it became No. 6 Group again. As in 1924 the Group was reformed the same day, this time as a bomber formation.

By this time the Group had shrunk to ten squadrons, all equipped with Fairey Battle aircraft and located in pairs at RAF Abingdon, RAF Harwell, RAF Benson, RAF Boscombe Down and RAF Bicester.

=== Second World War ===
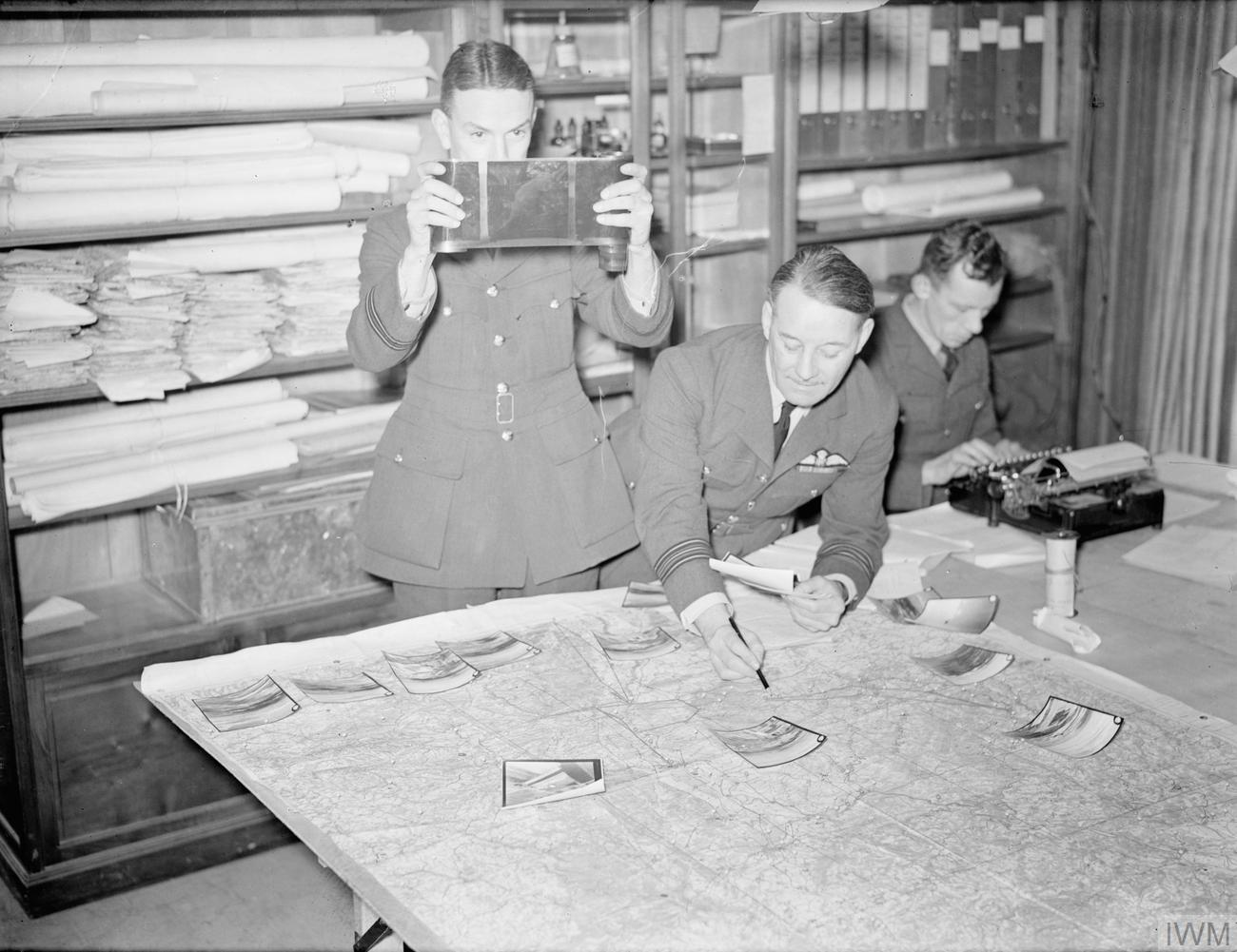
at the Headquarters of No. 71 Wing, Advanced Air Striking Force, Bétheniville.

On receipt of orders to move to France in 1939, Headquarters No. 1 Group became Headquarters Advanced Air Striking Force and the station headquarters and associated squadrons became Nos. 71, 72, 74, 75 and 76 Wings respectively. The Group re-emerged a few days later within Bomber Command on 12 September, but only lasted just over three months, being dropped on 22 December 1939.

It was reformed at Hucknall in Nottinghamshire on 22 June 1940. On 20 July the Group Headquarters moved to Bawtry Hall (RAF Bawtry) near Doncaster, where it was based for 44 years, until 1983. During the Second World War, the Group was primarily based at airfields in north Lincolnshire, like RAF Swinderby.

Between 1940 and 1945, the group included a number of Polish and Royal Australian Air Force (RAAF) personnel. By the beginning of March 1943, the aircraft operated by its squadrons were:

- Vickers Wellington: 166 & 199 Sqns RAF, and 300 Polish, 301 Polish & 305 Polish Sqns.
- Avro Lancaster: 12, 100, 101, 150 & 103 Sqns RAF, and 460 Sqn RAAF.

All of the Wellington squadrons subsequently converted to Lancasters. No. 1 Group was later augmented with other units, including 304 Polish Squadron which served form April 1941 to May 1942. By the end of the war the group consisted of 14 operational Lancaster squadrons, of which one (460 Sqn) was RAAF, and one (300 Sqn) was Polish.

During Bomber Command's Second World War campaign, No. 1 Group dropped a higher tonnage of bombs per aircraft than any other group, this was mainly due to its South African commander, Air Vice-Marshal Edward Rice, who was determined to maximise bomb loads, though it was a policy which contributed in no small measure to No. 1 Group having higher than average losses. Rice would later be involved in the development of the Rose turret, sometimes known as the "Rose-Rice turret".

==== Battle of Normandy ====
Although No.1 (B) Group wasn't directly involved in the Battle of Normandy, they did participate in the bombing of the shore and area. During this period, the group was organised as:

- No. 1 (B) Group HQ, RAF Bawtry, West Yorkshire
- RAF Hemswell
  - Station HQ
  - No. 1 Lancaster Finishing School (training with Lancaster I/III)
  - Night Bomber Tactical School
  - 150 Squadron Lancaster I (C flight from 550 Squadron)
- RAF Ingham (satellite of RAF Hemswell)
  - Station HQ
  - No. 1481 (Bomber) Gunnery Flight RAF equipped with Wellington III and Miles Martinet
  - No. 1687 Bomber (Defence) Training Flight RAF equipped with Supermarine Spitfire & Hawker Hurricane
- RAF Sturgate (satellite of RAF Hemswell)
- No. 11 Base
  - RAF Lindholme Station HQ
  - No. 1656 Heavy Conversion Unit RAF, RAF Lindholme equipped with Avro Lancaster I/III
  - No. 1662 Heavy Conversion Unit RAF, RAF Blyton equipped with Avro Lancaster I/III & Handley Page Halifax II/V
  - No. 1667 Heavy Conversion Unit RAF, RAF Sandtoft equipped with Handley Page Halifax V
  - No. 1 Group Servicing Section, RAF Lindholme
- No. 12 Base
  - RAF Binbrook Station HQ
  - No. 100 Squadron RAF, RAF Grimsby equipped with Avro Lancaster I/III
    - No. 9100 Servicing Echelon
  - No. 460 Squadron RAAF, RAF Binbrook equipped with Avro Lancaster I/III
    - No. 9460 Servicing Echelon
  - No. 625 Squadron RAF, RAF Kelstern, equipped with Avro Lancaster I/III
    - No. 9625 Servicing Echelon
  - No. 1 Ground Gunnery School, RAF Binbrook
- No. 13 Base
  - RAF Elsham Wolds Station HQ
  - No. 103 Squadron RAF, RAF Elsham Wolds equipped with Avro Lancaster I/III
    - No. 9103 Servicing Echelon
  - No. 166 Squadron RAF, RAF Kirmington equipped with Avro Lancaster I/III
    - No. 9166 Servicing Echelon
  - No. 550 Squadron RAF, RAF North Killingholme equipped with Avro Lancaster I/III
    - No. 9550 Servicing Echelon
  - No. 576 Squadron RAF, RAF Elsham Wolds equipped with Avro Lancaster I/III
    - No. 9576 Servicing Echelon
- No.14 Base
  - RAF Ludford Magna Station HQ
  - No. 12 Squadron RAF, RAF Wickenby equipped with Avro Lancaster I/III
    - No. 9012 Servicing Echelon
  - No. 101 Squadron RAF, RAF Ludford Magna equipped with Avro Lancaster I/III
    - No. 9101 Servicing Echelon
  - No. 300 Polish Bomber Squadron, RAF Faldingworth with Avro Lancaster I/III
    - No. 9300 Servicing Echelon
  - No. 626 Squadron RAF, RAF Wickenby equipped with Avro Lancaster I/III
    - No. 9626 Servicing Echelon
- No. 15 Base operational between October 1944 and October 1945
  - RAF Scampton Station HQ
  - RAF Dunholme Lodge
  - RAF Fiskerton
  - RAF Hemswell

=== Cold War ===
By June 1948, 1 Group consisted of:

- 9 Sqn, RAF Binbrook, Avro Lincoln B.2
- 12 Sqn, RAF Binbrook, Lincoln B.2
- 101 Sqn, RAF Binbrook, Lincoln B.2
- 617 Sqn, RAF Binbrook, Lincoln B.2
- 83 Sqn, RAF Hemswell, Lincoln B.2
- 97 Sqn, RAF Hemswell, Lincoln B.2
- 100 Sqn, RAF Hemswell, Lincoln B.2
- 50 Sqn, RAF Waddington, Lincoln B.2
- 57 Sqn, RAF Waddington, Lincoln B.2
- 61 Sqn, RAF Waddington, Lincoln B.2
- 109 Sqn, RAF Coningsby, de Havilland Mosquito B.35
- 139 Sqn, RAF Coningsby, Mosquito B.35

During the Cold War, No. 1 Group also operated the Thor ballistic missile between 1958 and August 1963 ("Project Emily"), with ten squadrons each with three missiles being equipped with the weapon. 1 Group had two sets of five stations, centred respectively on Hemswell and RAF Driffield. When Bomber Command was subsumed into the new Strike Command on 1 April 1968, No. 1 Group took on the old role of the command, directing the bomber and strike aircraft of Strike Command.

On 17 November 1983, No. 38 Group RAF was subsumed within Headquarters No. 1 Group.

In around 1984, Headquarters No. 1 Group moved from RAF Bawtry in South Yorkshire to RAF Upavon in Wiltshire. No. 207 Squadron RAF, part of 1 Group flying Devons from RAF Northolt alongside No. 32 Squadron RAF, was disbanded on retirement of the remaining Devons on 30 June 1984.

After the end of the Cold War, RAF Germany was reduced in status to become No. 2 Group RAF. 2 Group was then disbanded by being absorbed into No. 1 Group on 1 April 1996. 2 Group was then reformed on 7 January 2000, splitting out of 1 Group. 1 Group transferred over the RAF's air transport, air-to-air refuelling and airborne early warning functions.

=== Post 2000 ===
In January 2000 the RAF was restructured and the Group took on its present role. The Group is responsible for UK air defence operations through QRA North at RAF Lossiemouth and QRA South at RAF Coningsby. However, since the disestablishment of Combined Air Operations Centre 9 at RAF High Wycombe, actual control of the fighters is now carried out from a NATO Combined Air Operations Centre in Denmark, CAOC 1 at Finderup. However, High Wycombe retains an air defence direction capability, and the UK Representative there could take back control over QRA South if it was necessary to respond to a terrorist threat from the air. No. 1 Group also has responsibility for the UK's Carrier Strike capability, with the joint RN/RAF Lightning Force, eventually planned to consist of two squadrons from the RAF and two from the Fleet Air Arm, which will be based at RAF Marham when not operating from the UK's Queen Elizabeth-class aircraft carrier.

The Defence Reform Report ("Levene Report") of 2011 heralded more trimming of the Armed Forces' command superstructure. Following the Levene Report's publication, in 2012-2013, the post of Commander-in-Chief, RAF Air Command, the last of the RAF's major command (military formation)s, was abolished/discontinued. The move of the Chief of the Air Staff's office from MOD Main Building to High Wycombe effectively meant the disbandment of Air Command. The function of Air Command slid into the role of the three-star Air and Space Commander, who now supervises the groups.

== Component units ==
As of November 2025, No. 1 Group comprises the following elements and units. Unless indicated otherwise, subordinate units are located at the same location as the unit they report to.

=== Air and Space Warfare Centre ===
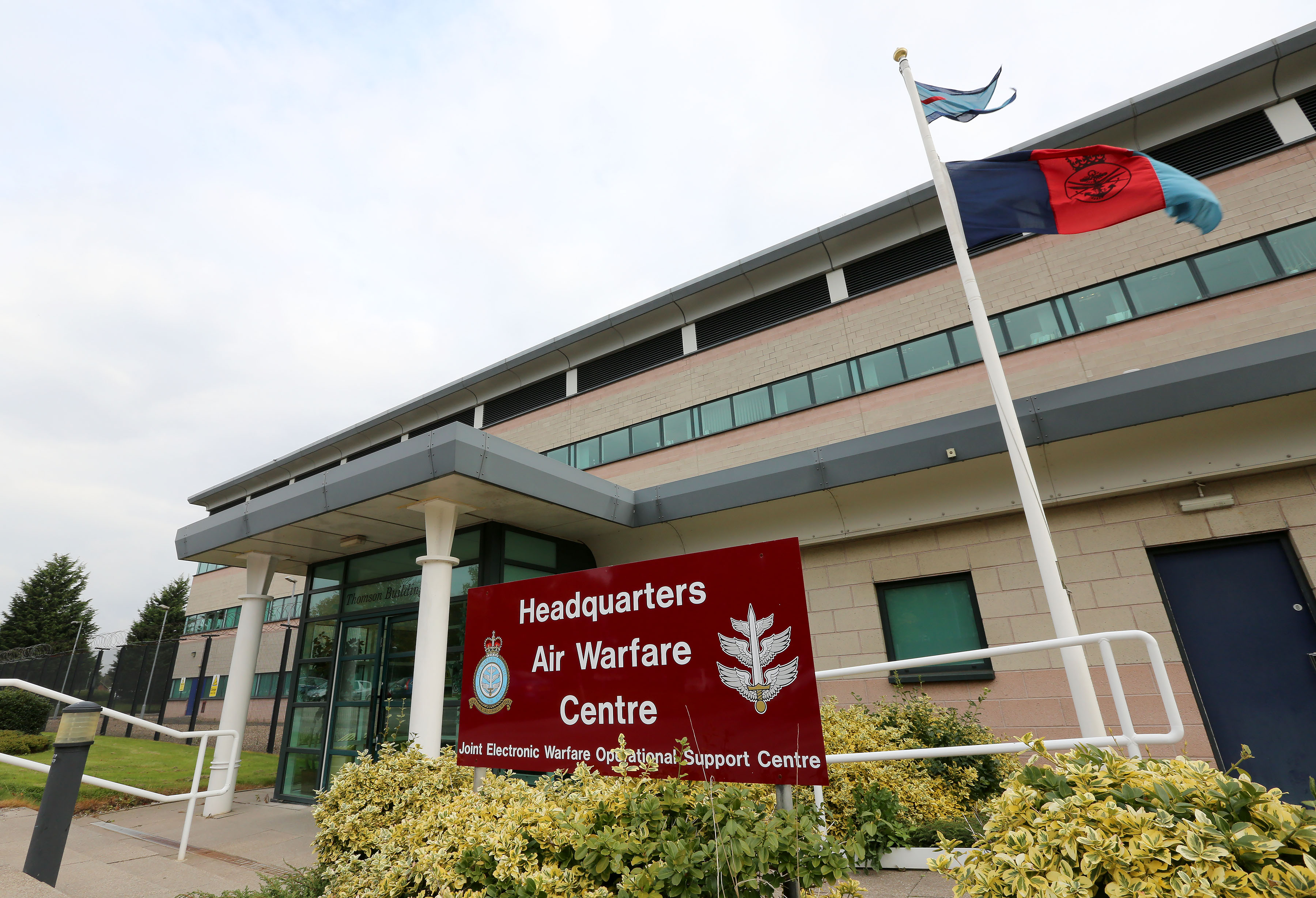
The Thomson Building at RAF Waddington, headquarters of the RAF Air and Space Warfare Centre

The Air and Space Warfare Centre is based at RAF Waddington and provides advice to support current and future RAF operations, including in relation to electronic-warfare, cyber and information environments. It comprises the following units:

- Headquarters Air and Space Warfare Centre (RAF Waddington)
  - No. 17 Test and Evaluation Squadron – F-35B Lightning (Edwards AFB, California)
  - No. 41 Test and Evaluation Squadron – Eurofighter Typhoon FGR4 (RAF Coningsby)
  - No. 56 Test and Evaluation Squadron – Poseidon MRA1, Protector RG1, RC-135W Airseeker and Shadow R1
  - No. 92 Tactics and Training Squadron
  - No. 206 Test and Evaluation Squadron – A400M Atlas and C-17 Globemaster III (RAF Brize Norton)
  - No. 216 Squadron – drone swarm technology testing
  - Empire Test Pilots' School (MOD Boscombe Down)
  - Rotary Wing Test and Evaluation Squadron – various helicopters (MOD Boscombe Down)
  - Joint Air Delivery Test & Evaluation Unit (RAF Brize Norton)

=== Air Mobility Force ===
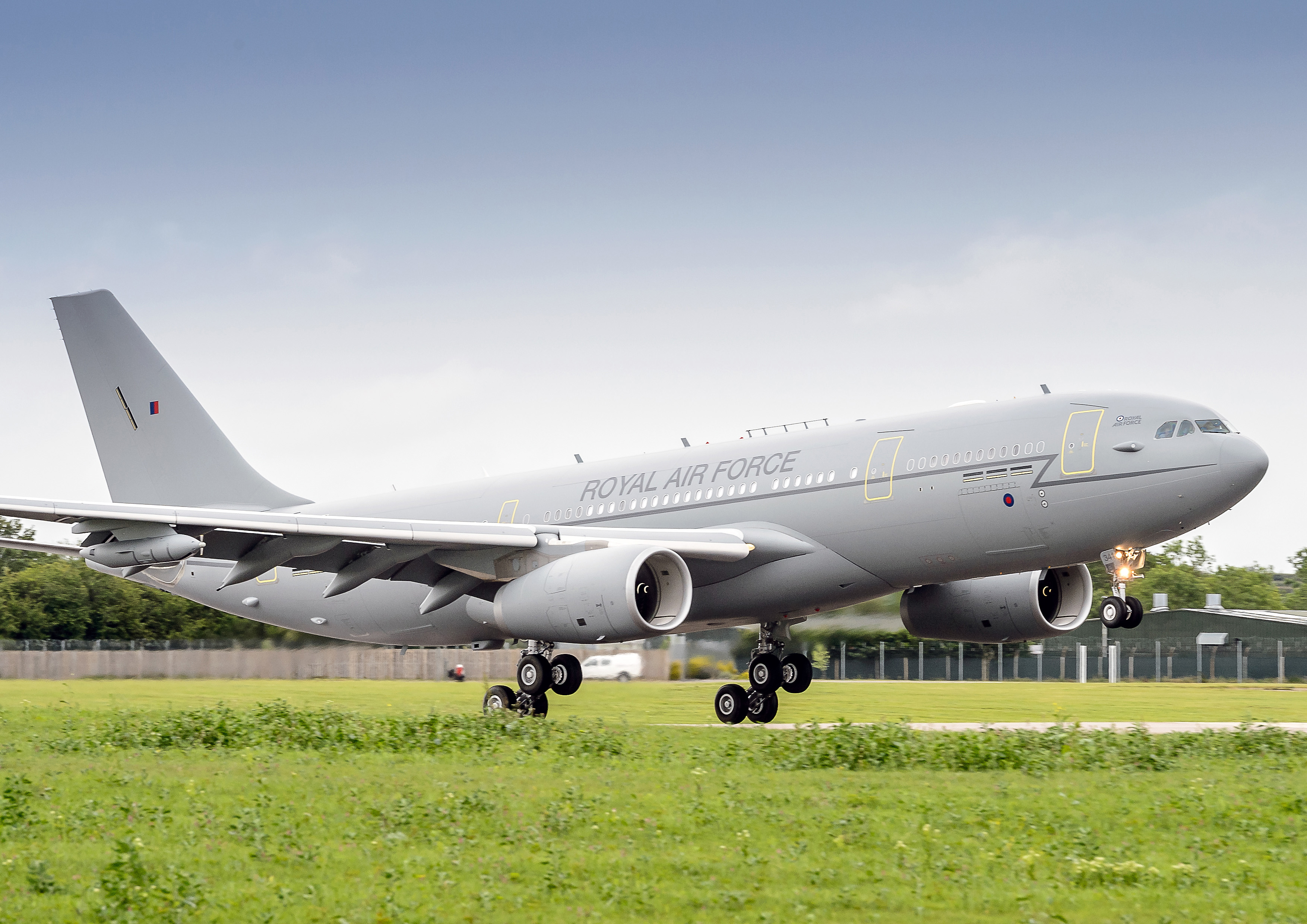
The Airbus Voyager KC2 aircraft provides the RAF with transport and air-to-air refuelling capabilities

The Air Mobility Force is based at RAF Brize Norton and provides the RAF's airlift capability in support of overseas operations and exercises, as well as air-to-air refuelling for fast jets, both on operations and in support of UK homeland defence. It comprises the following units:

- Headquarters Air Mobility Force (RAF Brize Norton)
  - No.10 Squadron – Voyager KC2/KC3
  - No. 24 Squadron – A400M Atlas and C-17 Globemaster III
  - No. 30 Squadron – A400M Atlas
  - No. 32 (The Royal) Squadron – Envoy IV CC1 (RAF Northolt)
  - No. 70 Squadron – A400M Atlas
  - No. 99 Squadron – C-17 Globemaster III
  - No. 101 Squadron – Voyager KC2/KC3
  - No. 622 (Reserve Aircrew) Squadron (RAuxAF)
  - Airborne Delivery Wing
    - Headquarters and Operation Squadron
    - Performance Development Squadron
    - Parachute Engineering Squadron
    - Parachute Training Squadron
    - Support Squadron
  - Airport of Embarkation Wing

=== Combat Air Force ===
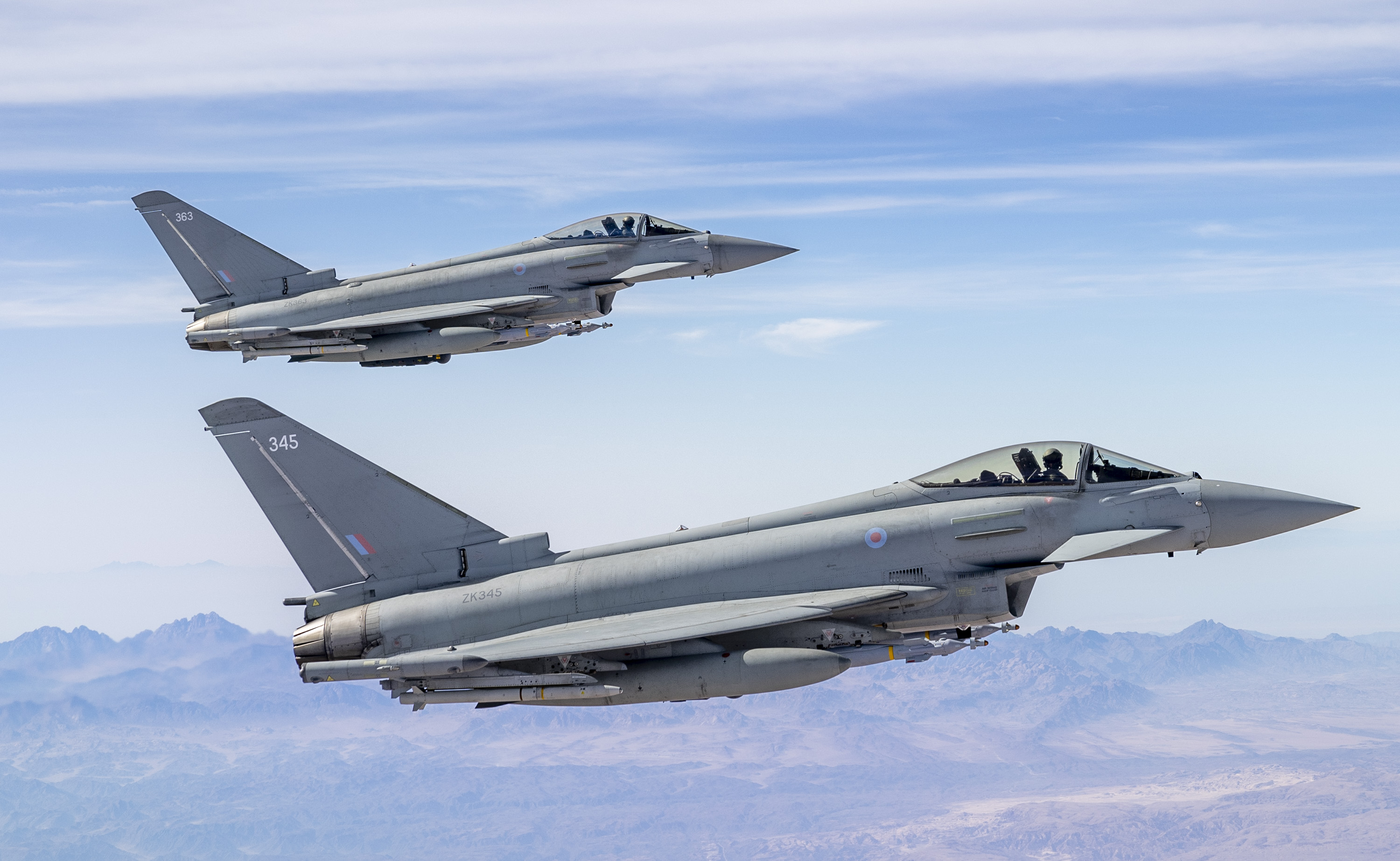
The Combat Air Force operates the Eurofighter Typhoon FGR4 and Lockheed Martin F-35 Lightning II

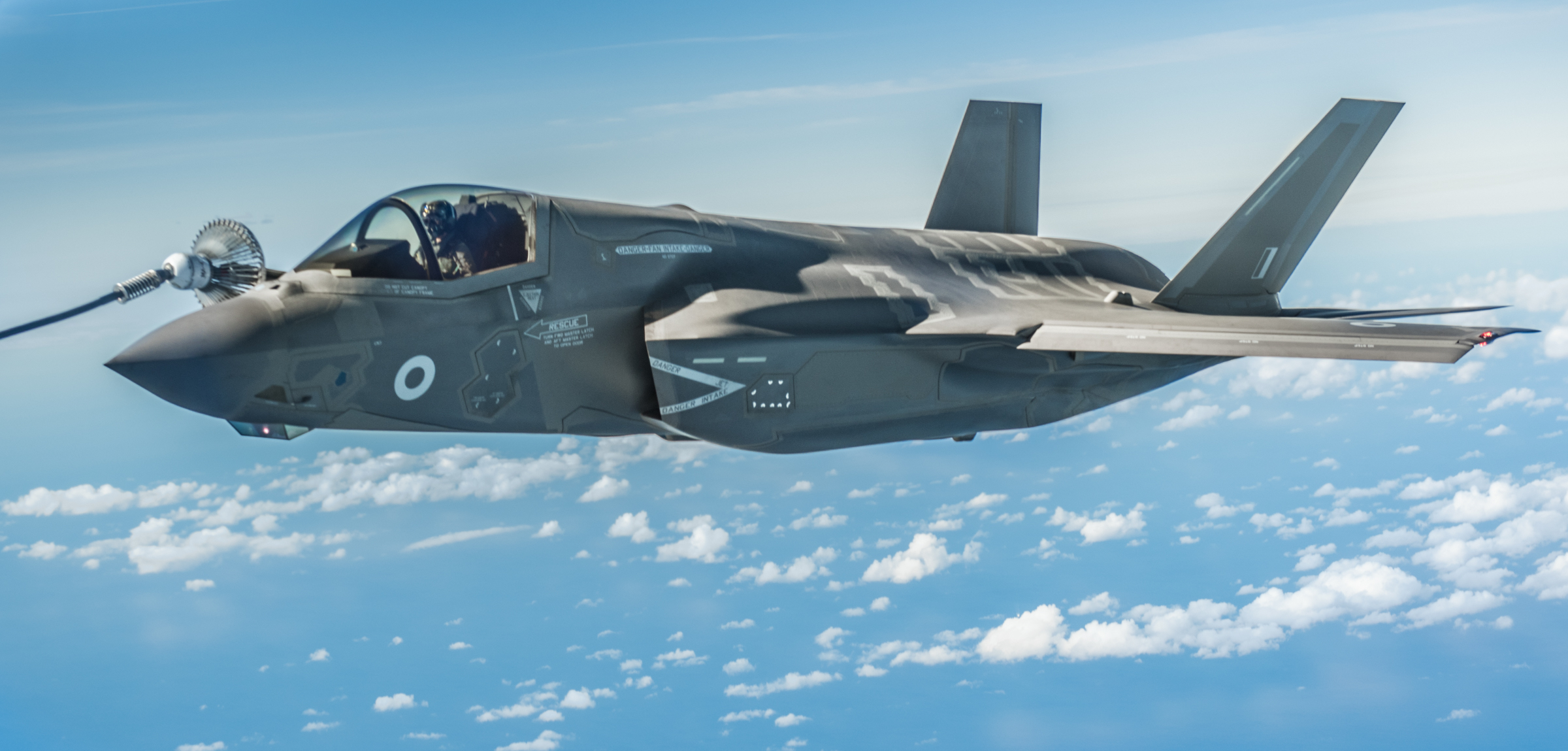

The Combat Air Force generates, operates and sustains combat air power in all tasked roles and environments to defend the UK and its interests globally. It also defends UK sovereign airspace 24 hours a day, 7 days a week and 365 days a year. It comprises the following units:

- Headquarters Combat Air Force (RAF Coningsby)
  - No. 1 Squadron – Typhoon FGR4 (RAF Lossiemouth)
  - No. 2 Squadron – Typhoon FGR4 (RAF Lossiemouth)
  - No. 3 Squadron – Typhoon FGR4 (RAF Coningsby)
  - No. 6 Squadron – Typhoon FGR4 (RAF Lossiemouth)
  - No. 9 Squadron – Typhoon FGR4 (RAF Lossiemouth) (Note: Operates Tranche 1 aircraft in aggressor role)
  - No. 11 Squadron – Typhoon FGR4 (RAF Coningsby)
  - No. 12 Squadron – Typhoon FGR4 (RAF Coningsby)
  - No. 29 Squadron (operational conversion unit) – Typhoon FGR4 (RAF Coningsby)
  - No. 207 Squadron (operational conversion unit) – F-35B Lightning (RAF Marham)
  - No. 617 Squadron – F-35B Lightning (RAF Marham)
  - 809 Naval Air Squadron – F-35B Lightning (RAF Marham) (Note: Fleet Air Arm unit but subordinate to No. 1 Group)
  - Display Air Wing (RAF Waddington)
    - Battle of Britain Memorial Flight – Spitfire, Hurricane, Lancaster, Dakota and Chipmunk (RAF Coningsby)
    - RAF Aerobatic Team (The Red Arrows) – BAE Hawk T1A
    - RAF Falcons Parachute Display Team (RAF Brize Norton)
    - Typhoon Display Team – Eurofighter Typhoon FGR4 (RAF Coningsby)

=== ISTAR Force ===
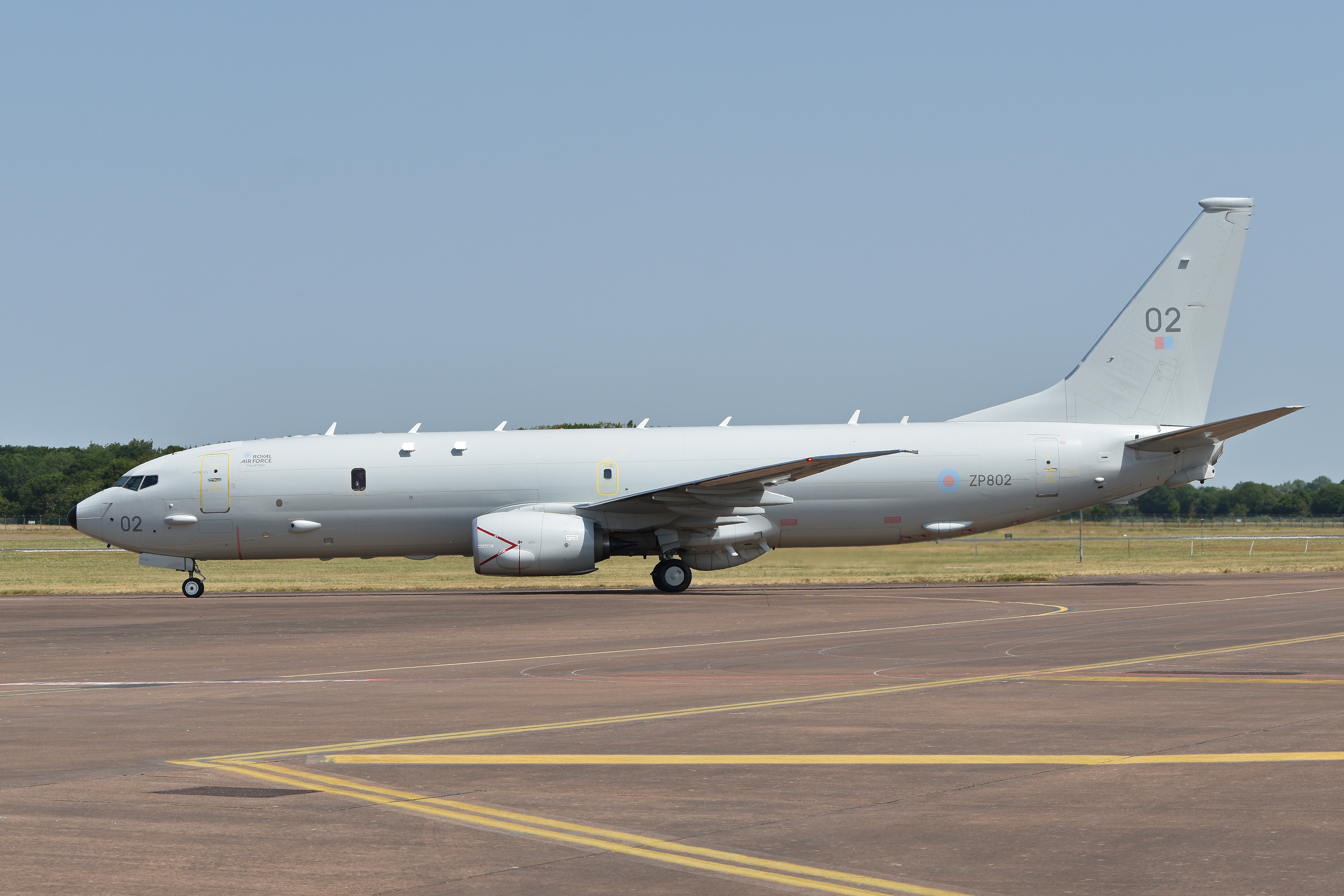
The ISTAR Force's Boeing Poseidon MRA1 fleet is based at RAF Lossiemouth and provides a maritime patrol and reconnaissance capability

The Intelligence, Surveillance, Target Acquisition, and Reconnaissance (ISTAR) Force delivers near-real time information and intelligence in air and maritime domains. It comprises the following units:

- Headquarters ISTAR Force (RAF Waddington)
  - No. 8 Squadron – E-7A Wedgetail (RAF Lossiemouth) (from 2026)
  - No. 13 Squadron – Protector RG1
  - No. 14 Squadron – Shadow R1
  - No. 31 Squadron – Protector RG1
  - No. 51 Squadron – RC-135W Rivet Joint
  - No. 54 Squadron (operational conversion unit) – Poseidon MRA1, RC-135W Rivet Joint and Shadow R1
  - No. 120 Squadron – Poseidon MRA1 (RAF Lossiemouth)
  - No. 201 Squadron – Poseidon MRA1 (RAF Lossiemouth)
  - No. 1 Intelligence, Surveillance, and Reconnaissance (ISR) Wing
    - No. 2 ISR Squadron
    - No. 3 ISR (Regional Intelligence Geographic Centre-Northern Ireland)
    - No. 54 Signals Unit
    - ISR Support Squadron
      - No. 54 Signals Unit Engineering Flight (RAF Waddington and RAF Digby)
      - ISR Engineering Flight (RAF Waddington and RAF Marham)

== Heritage ==
The group's badge features a black panther's head, erased. The badge was authorised in 1941 and the panther's head reflected the fact that Panther was the group's callsign in the early part of the Second World War.

The group's motto is Swift to attack.

== Air Officer Commanding ==
Air Officers Commanding have included:

- 1 April 1918 unknown
- 16 February 1920 Brigadier-General John Becke
- 29 February 1920 Group Captain Hugh Dowding
- 27 February 1922 Group Captain Eugene Gerrard
- 1 January 1923 Air Commodore E L Gerrard
- 21 July 1924 Group Captain Robert Gordon
- 31 December 1924 Group Captain P L W Herbert
- 12 April 1926 – 25 August 1927 group disbanded
- 9 August 1927 Air Commodore E L Gerrard
- 11 November 1929 Air Commodore William Foster
- 2 January 1934 Air Commodore Jack Baldwin
- 12 August 1935 Air Commodore J C Quinnell
- 1 May 1936 Air Commodore Owen Tudor Boyd
- 7 January 1937 Air Commodore S W Smith
- 17 February 1938 Air Vice-Marshal Patrick Playfair
- 24 August 1939 – 12 September 1939 No. 1 Group Renamed Advanced Air Striking Force
- 3 September 1939 Air Vice-Marshal A C Wright
- 22 December 1939 – 22 June 1940 group disbanded
- 27 June 1940 Air Commodore John Breen
- 27 November 1940 Air Vice-Marshal Robert Oxland
- 24 February 1943 Air Vice-Marshal E A B Rice
- 12 February 1945 Air Vice-Marshal Robert Blucke
- 15 January 1947 Air Vice-Marshal Charles Guest
- 24 January 1949 Air Vice-Marshal George Mills
- 8 August 1950 Air Vice-Marshal Edmund Hudleston
- 5 April 1951 Air Vice-Marshal Dermot Boyle
- 27 April 1953 Air Vice-Marshal John Whitley
- 3 October 1956 Air Vice-Marshal Augustus Walker
- 14 June 1959 Air Vice-Marshal John Davis
- 1 December 1961 Air Vice-Marshal Patrick Dunn
- 1 May 1964 Air Vice-Marshal Deryck Stapleton
- 1 June 1966 Air Vice-Marshal M H Le Bas
- 23 December 1968 Air Vice-Marshal Ruthven Wade
- 8 February 1971 Air Vice-Marshal Peter Horsley
- 3 March 1973 Air Vice-Marshal David Evans
- 29 November 1975 Air Vice-Marshal P J Lagesen
- 5 July 1978 Air Vice-Marshal David Craig
- 11 April 1980 Air Vice-Marshal Michael Knight
- 18 December 1982 Air Vice-Marshal David Parry-Evans
- 17 September 1983 Air Commodore H S Carver
- 1 April 1984 Air Vice-Marshal Michael Simmons
- 19 February 1987 Air Vice-Marshal John Thomson
- 24 February 1989 Air Vice-Marshal Andrew Wilson
- 1989-1991 Air Vice-Marshal Sandy Wilson, also forward commander RAF Forces in Middle East
- 1991–1993 Air Vice-Marshal Richard Johns
- 1993–1994 Air Vice-Marshal Peter Squire
- 1994–1997 Air Vice-Marshal John Day
- 1997–1998 Air Vice-Marshal Jock Stirrup
- 1998–2000 Air Vice-Marshal J H Thompson
- 2000–2001 Air Vice-Marshal P V Harris
- 2001–2003 Air Vice-Marshal Glenn Torpy
- 2003–2005 Air Vice-Marshal Chris Moran
- 2005–2007 Air Vice-Marshal David Walker
- 2007–2009 Air Vice-Marshal Chris Harper
- 2009–2011 Air Vice-Marshal Greg Bagwell
- 2011–2014 Air Vice-Marshal Stuart Atha
- 2014–2016 Air Vice-Marshal Gary Waterfall
- 2016–2018 Air Vice Marshal Gerry Mayhew
- 2018–2020 Air Vice Marshal Harv Smyth
- 2020–2021 Air Vice Marshal Allan Marshall
- 2021–2023 Air Vice Marshal Ian Duguid
- 2023–2025 Air Vice Marshal Mark Flewin
- 2025–2026 Air Vice Marshal Mark Jackson
- 2026-present Air Vice Marshal Simon Strasdin

== See also ==
- List of Royal Air Force groups
- List of Army Air Corps aircraft units
