= No. 503 Squadron RAF =

No. 503 (County of Lincoln) Squadron RAuxAF
- Active: 5 October 1926 – 1 November 1938
- Country: United Kingdom
- Branch: Royal Auxiliary Air Force
- Type: Inactive
- Role: Bomber
- Part of: No. 6 (Auxiliary) Group RAF, Bomber Command
- Nickname(s): County of Lincoln

Insignia
- Squadron Badge heraldry: The arms of the county of Lincoln with an eagle above (unofficial)

No. 503 (City of Lincoln) Squadron RAuxAF was an auxiliary squadron of the Royal Air Force. It operated as a bomber squadron in the 1920s and 1930s, but was disbanded before the outbreak of the Second World War.

== History ==
The squadron was formed on 5 October 1926 at RAF Waddington in Lincolnshire as No. 503 (Bombing) Squadron of the Special Reserve, manned by part-time volunteers. It was at first equipped with Fairey Fawn light day bombers. It re-equipped with the partly wooden Handley Page Hyderabad heavy night bomber in 1929, receiving the improved, all-metal Handley Page Hinaidi from 1933. Some squadron members thought the Hyderabad superior to the Hinaidi, but when a squadron member discovered dry rot in the longeron of a Hyderabad they settled for the 'newcomer', some almost having spent their life of 700 flying hours already.

In October 1935, it changed role again to become a day bomber squadron, receiving Westland Wallaces. These were replaced by the Hawker Hart in June 1936, these in turn starting to be replaced by the updated Hawker Hind in July 1938. However, in 1938 it was decided to switch the role of the Auxiliary Air Force to that of air defence, and on 1 November 503 Squadron was disbanded by renumbering it to No.616 (South Yorkshire) Squadron and moving it to RAF Doncaster.

== Aircraft operated ==
Aircraft operated by no. 503 Squadron RAF, data from
From	To	Aircraft	Version
October 1926	June 1929	Fairey Fawn	Mks.II & III
February 1929	January 1934	Handley Page Hyderabad	
October 1933	November 1935	Handley Page Hinaidi	
October 1935	September 1936	Westland Wallace	Mk.I
November 1935	September 1936	Westland Wallace	Mk.II
June 1936	November 1938	Hawker Hart	
June 1938	November 1938	Hawker Hind	

== Squadron bases ==
Bases and airfields used by no. 503 Squadron RAF, data from
From	To	Base	Remark
October 1926	November 1938	RAF Waddington, Lincolnshire	

== Commanding officers ==
Officers commanding no. 503 Squadron RAF, data from
From	To	Name
November 1926		S/Ldr. R.D. Oxland
	15 February 1930	W/Cdr. The Hon. L.J.E. Twistleton-Wykeham-Fiennes
15 February 1930	11 May 1931	W/Cdr. H.P. Lale, DSO, DFC
11 May 1931	9 August 1933	W/Cdr. H.I. Hanmer, DFC
9 August 1933	January 1936	W/Cdr. A.P.V. Daly, AFC
January 1936		S/Ldr. A.F. James
	30 May 1937	S/Ldr. H. Power (acting)

== See also ==
- List of Royal Air Force aircraft squadrons
