= John Breen (RAF officer) =

Royal Air Force air marshal (1896–1964)

John Joseph Breen
- Born: 8 March 1896; Dublin, Ireland
- Died: 9 May 1964 (aged 68); Dublin, Ireland
- Military career
- Allegiance: United Kingdom
- Branch: British Army (1914–18); Royal Air Force (1918–46)
- Service years: 1914–46
- Rank: Air Marshal
- Commands: No. 1 Group (1940); No. 33 Squadron (1929–30); No. 84 Squadron (1928–29)
- Conflicts: World War I World War II
- Awards: Companion of the Order of the Bath; Officer of the Order of the British Empire; Mentioned in dispatches (3)

Air Marshal John Joseph Breen, CB, OBE (8 March 1896 – 9 May 1964) was a First World War aviator and senior officer in the Royal Air Force (RAF) during the Second World War.

== Early life ==
Born in Dublin, Ireland, on 8 March 1896, Breen was the son of Inspector-General T. J. Breen of the Royal Navy, and was educated at Beamont College then Trinity College, Dublin. He entered the Royal Military College, Sandhurst, and was commissioned into the Royal Irish Regiment. He obtained the Royal Aero Club Aviator's Certificate at the Military School, Shoreham, on 18 November 1915.

== Service ==
Breen was seconded from the Royal Irish Regiment to the Royal Flying Corps in 1915. He transferred from the British Army to the RAF in 1918 as a captain in 1918. He was promoted to squadron leader in 1925 with No. 24 Squadron RAF. He was posted to Iraq as commander of an armoured car wing. He then commanded No. 84 Squadron RAF and No. 33 Squadron RAF before a period of study at the Imperial Defence College. As a wing commander in 1935 he was attached to the Sudan Defence Force in Khartoum.

From 27 June 1940 he was appointed Air Officer Commanding No. 1 Group at RAF Bomber Command and served in this post during the Battle of Britain, but in December 1940 he was moved to the Air Ministry on promotion to air commodore. He later served as Director General of Personnel for the RAF and as Head of the Postwar Planning Executive before retiring as an air marshal on 2 May 1946. He died in 1964 aged 68.
