= Joint Combat Aircraft =

F-35 aircraft in UK service

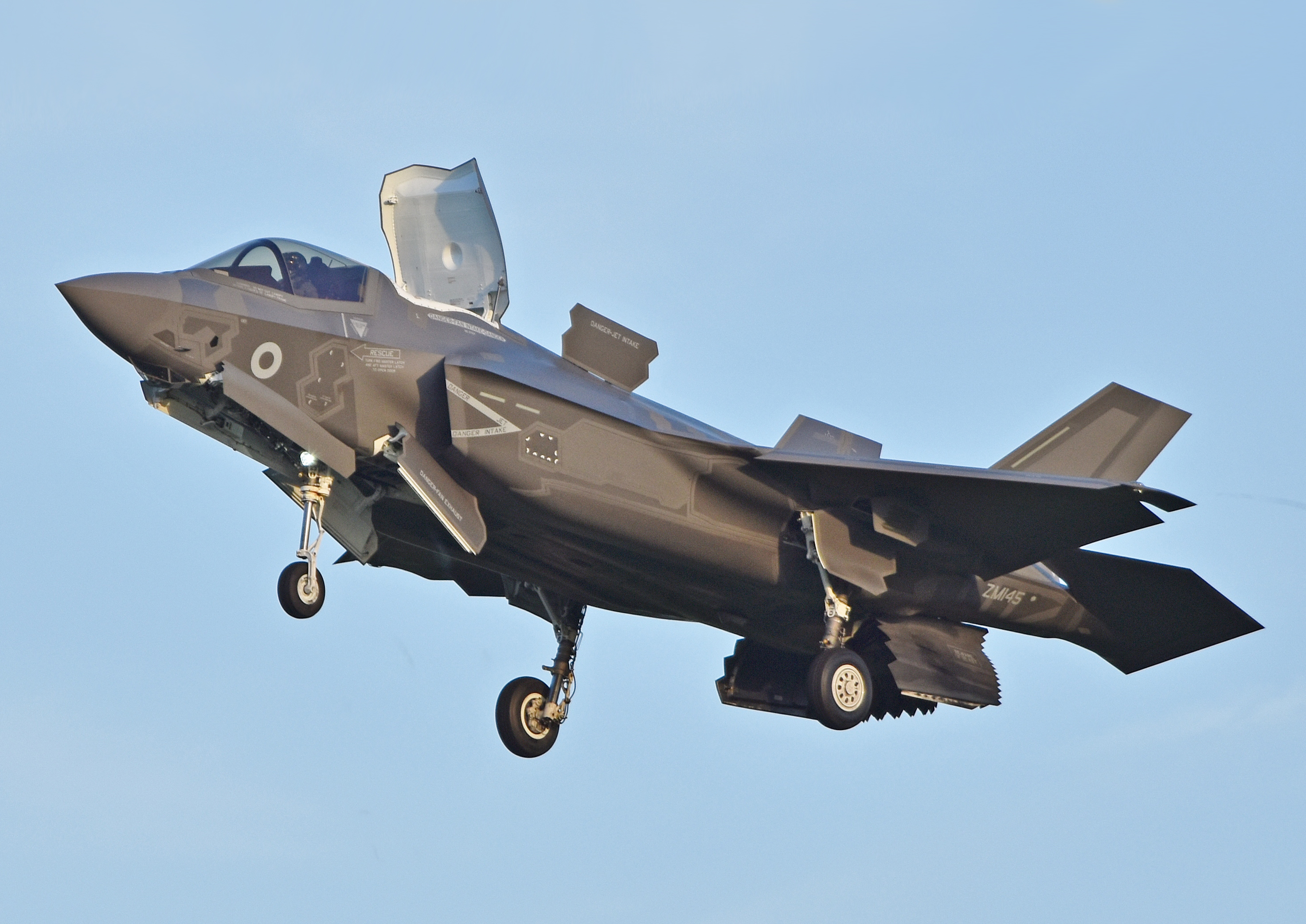
The F-35B became the UK's STOVL multirole aircraft replacement

The Joint Combat Aircraft (JCA) is the official designation of the United Kingdom Ministry of Defence used for the F-35 Lightning II. The F-35, developed from the X-35, is the result of the Joint Strike Fighter program.

JCA has been closely aligned with the "Future Carrier" (CVF) programme due to the interdependencies between the two; the latter developed into the Queen Elizabeth class. Both the F-35s and the carriers are the main elements of "Carrier Strike", the term for an initial capability for both elements along with the Merlin Crowsnest airborne radar system. The next steps is the introduction of the second carrier and a second squadron of F-35Bs to allow the carriers to operate the full range of intended roles; this capability, "Carrier Enabled Power Projection" is expected in 2026.

== Programme history ==
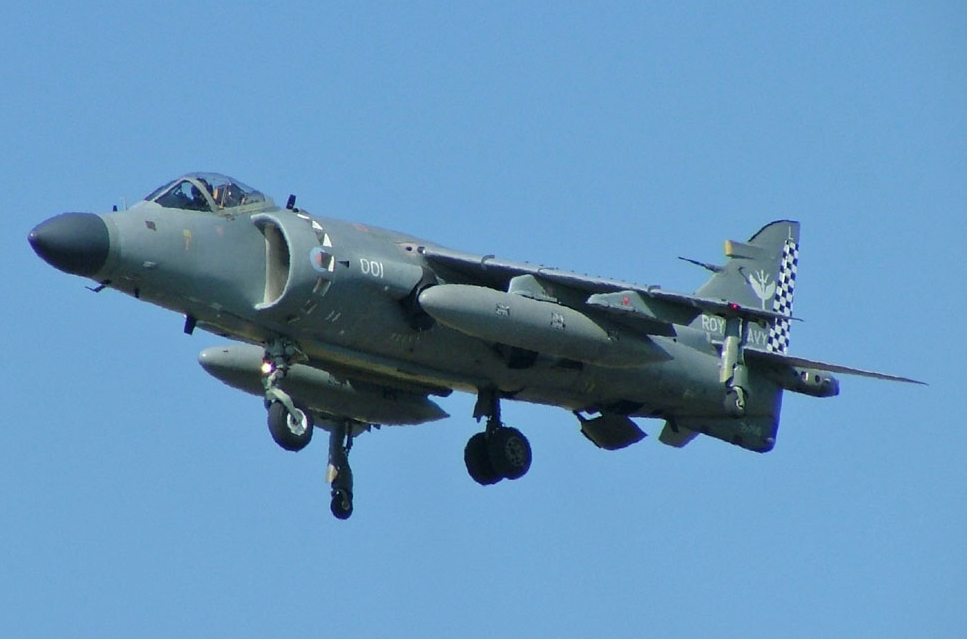
The Sea Harrier was retired in 2006.

The JCA programme began as a result of the approval of a "Staff Target" in 1996 for a Future Carrier Borne Aircraft (FCBA), a multirole fighter/attack aircraft to replace the Royal Navy's Sea Harrier FA2.

In 1998 the British Government published its Strategic Defence Review (SDR) which confirmed the strategy for future British carrier aircraft:

- The creation of "Joint Force 2000" combining the Royal Navy's Harrier FA2s and RAF Harrier GR7s into a joint force capable of operating from land bases or aircraft carriers.
- The procurement of a future carrier borne aircraft was confirmed, replacing both the Royal Navy and RAF types.
- The replacement of the three Invincible-class aircraft carriers with "two larger, more versatile, carriers capable of carrying a more powerful force".

Various carrier aircraft types and carrier configurations were studied. The SDR singled out the Joint Strike Fighter (JSF) as "a strong contender"; the UK had signed a Memorandum of Understanding signed in December 1995 making it a partner in the JSF Concept Demonstration phase. Other aircraft considered were the F/A-18E, Dassault Rafale-M, a 'navalised' Eurofighter Typhoon, and an "advanced Harrier".

The requirement to replace both Royal Navy and RAF Harriers led to the renaming of the programme as Future Joint Combat Aircraft (FJCA) in 2001. Later, in the third and final name change of the project, the word "future" was removed.

=== Aircraft selection ===
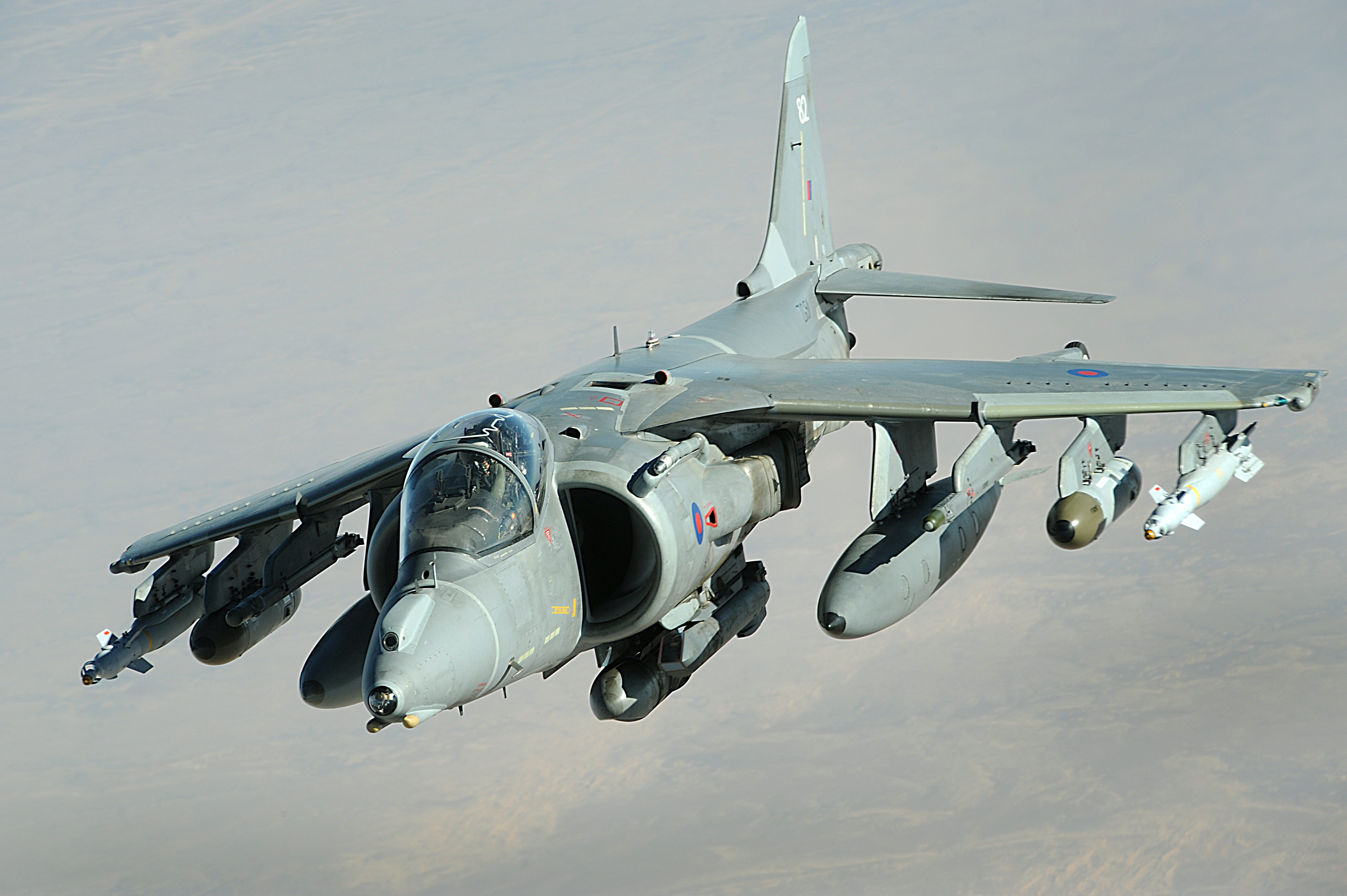
Following the Sea Harrier's retirement, the Harrier II was removed from service in 2011.

In January 2001, the UK signed a Memorandum of Understanding (MoU) with the US Department of Defense for full participation in the Joint Strike Fighter project, confirming the JSF as the JCA. This gave the UK significant input into aircraft design and the choice between the Lockheed Martin X-35 and Boeing X-32. On 26 October 2001, the DoD announced that Lockheed Martin had won the JSF contract.

On 30 September 2002, the MoD announced that the Royal Navy and RAF will operate the STOVL F-35B variant. At the same time it was announced that the carriers would take the form of large, conventional carriers, which will be adapted for STOVL operations. The carriers, expected to remain in service for 50 years, will be convertible to CATOBAR operations for the generation of aircraft after the F-35.

In 2007, the Ministry of Defence confirmed its order for two Queen Elizabeth-class aircraft carriers.

=== Technology transfer ===
The UK has invested GBP £1.08 billion in development funding for the JSF. Britain has also worked for five years for an ITAR waiver to allow greater technology transfer associated with the project. The effort, backed by the Bush administration, has been repeatedly blocked by US Congressman Henry Hyde because of his concern about potential technology transfer to third countries. On Friday 27 May 2006 President Bush and Prime Minister Tony Blair issued a joint statement which announced "both governments agree that the UK will have the ability to successfully operate, upgrade, employ, and maintain the Joint Strike Fighter such that the UK retains operational sovereignty over the aircraft."

In February 2006 the chairman of the Commons Defence Select Committee stated that unless the UK got "all the information and technology it requires to maintain and upgrade the aircraft independently.... [it] might have to consider whether to continue in the programme. Lord Drayson, Minister for Defence Procurement, while on a government visit to Washington to speak to members of Congress stated "We do expect [the software] technology transfer to take place. But if it does not take place we will not be able to purchase these aircraft", and has mentioned that there is a 'plan B' if the deal falls through. Mike Turner (then-chairman of BAE systems) testified to the Commons Defence Select Committee that a feasible non-US alternative would be the development of a navalised Eurofighter Typhoon, recommending that the Joint Strike Fighter would be preferable but a navalised Typhoon could be a fall-back if the JSF program failed.

On 12 December 2006 the Memorandum of Understanding (MOU) for the next phase of the JSF programme was signed by Lord Drayson (as Minister for Defence Procurement), following a meeting with the US Deputy Secretary of Defense Gordon England. Lord Drayson said that he received necessary (for the purpose of operational sovereignty) assurances from the US on technology transfer to allow him to sign the MOU and thus for the UK to continue with the programme. The (UK) Ministry of Defence later clarified to the Commons Defence Select committee that "specific assurances provided by the US [about technology transfer] are contained in a separate highly classified bilateral supplement to the MOU".

=== 2010 Strategic Defence and Security Review ===
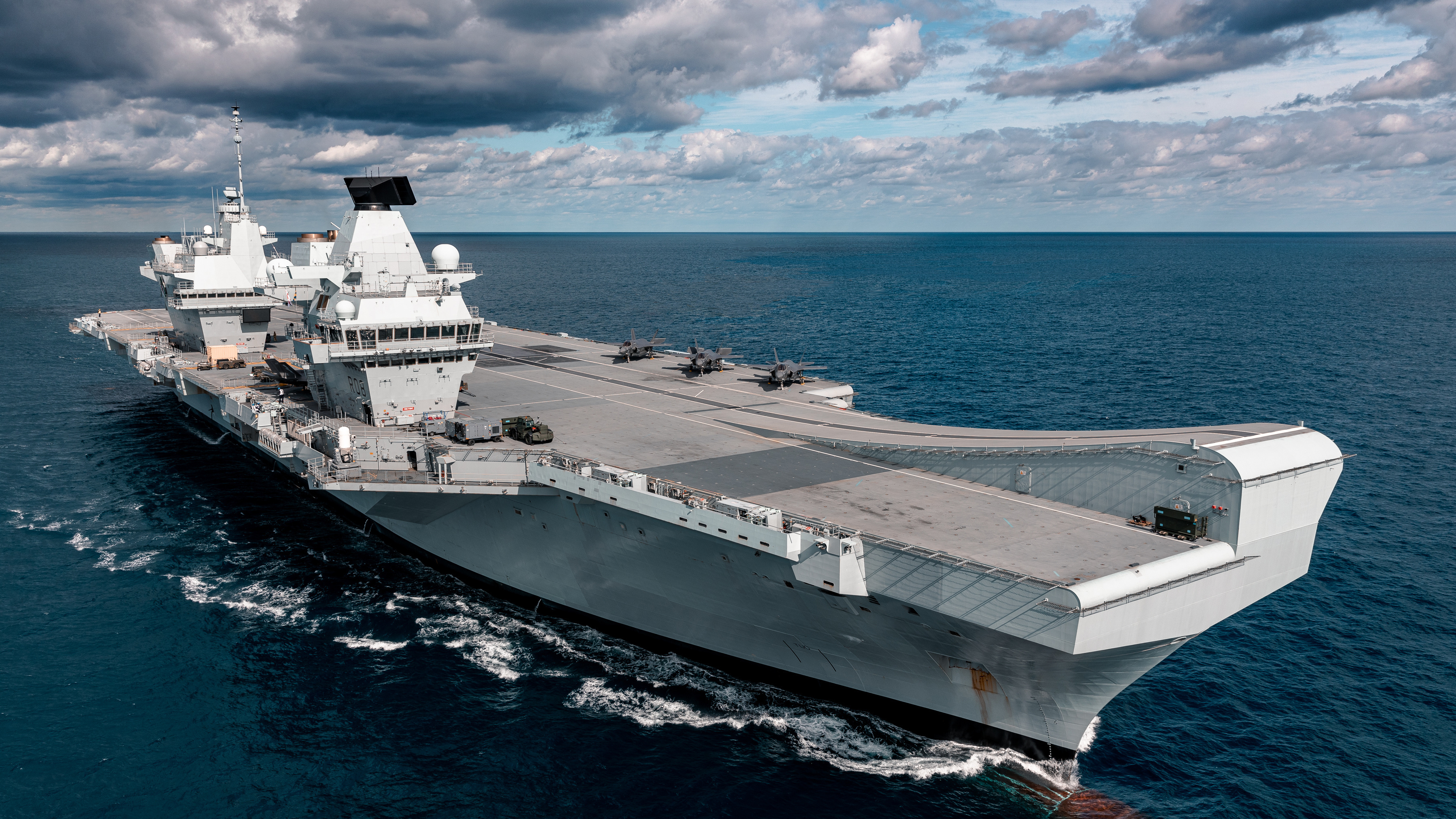
British F-35Bs aircraft operating from HMS Queen Elizabeth

As part of the 2010 Strategic Defence and Security Review, it was announced that the previous intention to order 138 STOVL F-35Bs had been changed to a smaller number of CATOBAR F-35Cs, with the anticipated entry to service delayed until around 2020. Only one Queen Elizabeth-class aircraft carrier would be equipped with a catapult, and was expected to normally include twelve F-35Cs in its air wing. In early 2012 the UK joint chiefs of staff publicly petitioned the Prime Minister to change the order back to the F-35B, on the grounds of lower cost, quicker implementation of fixed-wing carrier capability and the ability to operate both carriers with fixed-wing aircraft. On 10 May 2012, Philip Hammond announced that the coalition government had reverted to the Labour government plan to operate the F-35B STOVL variant.

In 2013 the Defence Select Committee said "We urge the MoD to learn the lessons of this closed, rushed and flawed decision of 2010."

=== Initial capability ===
Both the F-35s and the carriers are the main elements of "Carrier Strike", the term for an initial capability for both elements along with the Merlin Crowsnest airborne radar system. This was declared in January 2021:

all elements of the group from fighter jets to radar systems to anti-ship weapons have been successfully brought together and operated. Both the air and naval elements of the Carrier Strike Group have now met this milestone, which includes qualified pilots and ground crews being held at short notice for carrier-based operations and trained to handle weapons and maintain the equipment. Another marker of success at this stage includes the ability to deploy Anti-Submarine Warfare capabilities such as frigates and destroyers, as well as both fixed and rotary wing aircraft including Merlin helicopters to operate alongside the carrier.

Full operational capability is expected in 2023. The next step is the introduction of the second carrier and a second squadron of F-35Bs to allow the carriers to operate the full range of intended roles; this capability, "Carrier Enabled Power Projection", is expected in 2026. However, in early 2022 one analysis suggested that the second F-35 squadron might not stand up before 2026 and that a third frontline F-35 squadron might not be active before 2030. In September 2022, it was reported that the Fleet Air Arm Squadron (809 Naval Air Squadron) would formally re-commission in 2023 but that it would not be considered "deployable" for a further two years.

As of the end of 2022, 29 F-35Bs had been delivered to the U.K. (three of these being based in the U.S. for test and evaluation purposes). Seven additional aircraft are expected to be delivered in 2023, four in 2024 and seven in 2025, completing the delivery of the planned 48 tranche 1 (one of which was lost in 2021).

However, as of the end of 2022, U.K. Defence Secretary Ben Wallace reported that the RAF and Royal Navy faced a considerable challenge in providing even the existing modest F-35B fleet with qualified pilots. As of late 2022, there were only 30 qualified British pilots (plus three exchange pilots from the United States and Australia) for the F-35. The average wait time for RAF trainee Typhoon and F-35 pilots, after completing the Military Flying Training System, was approximately 11 and 12 months respectively. A further gap of 68 weeks existed between completing Basic Flying Training and beginning Advanced Fast Jet Training.

In February 2023, the Chief of the Air Staff, Air Chief Marshal Sir Mike Wigston, reported that the number of F-35 pilots had grown to 34 UK pilots with a further 7 to complete training by August 2023.

== Basing ==
In March 2013 it was announced that the F-35 main base would be RAF Marham, in Norfolk.

== See also ==
- Future Offensive Air System
