= Eurofighter Typhoon variants =

Variants of the Eurofighter Typhoon

Eurofighter Typhoon
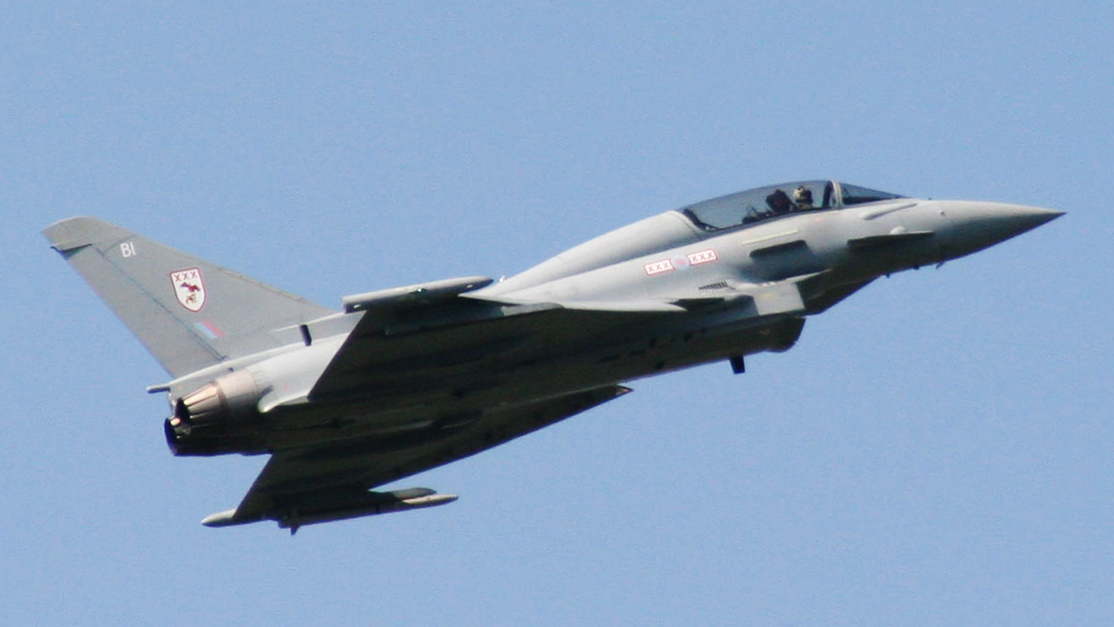
- A Royal Air Force Twin Seat typhoon.

General information
- Type: Multirole fighter
- National origin: United Kingdom, Italy, Germany and Spain
- Manufacturer: Eurofighter Jagdflugzeug GmbH
- Status: In service
- Primary users: Royal Air Force German Air Force; Italian Air Force; Spanish Air Force; See Operators below for others
- Number built: 603 (As of March 2024)

History
- Manufactured: 1994–present
- Introduction date: 4 August 2003
- First flight: 27 March 1994
- Developed from: British Aerospace EAP

The Eurofighter Typhoon is in service with nine nations: United Kingdom, Germany, Italy, Spain, Saudi Arabia, Oman, Qatar, Kuwait, and Austria, with orders for all nine customers still pending as of September 2017. The aircraft has, as of 2016, been provided in a basic air-defense form and has been upgraded to newer production standards which include internal IRST, air-to-ground precision strike capability (with Royal Air Force Typhoons participating in air strikes destroying tanks in Libya in 2011 as their combat debut), and HMSS (helmet-mounted symbology system) helmets. Most of the major systems including the CAPTOR radar and the Defence Aids Sub-System (DASS) are expected to be improved and updated over time, with the radar being updated to an AESA, being the CAPTOR-E/CAESAR, of which the Kuwait Air Force will be the inaugural operator, with first deliveries of their 28 new-built aircraft to commence in 2019.

== Development aircraft ==
Seven development aircraft (DA) were built with varying equipment fits and flight test roles.

DA1 Germany

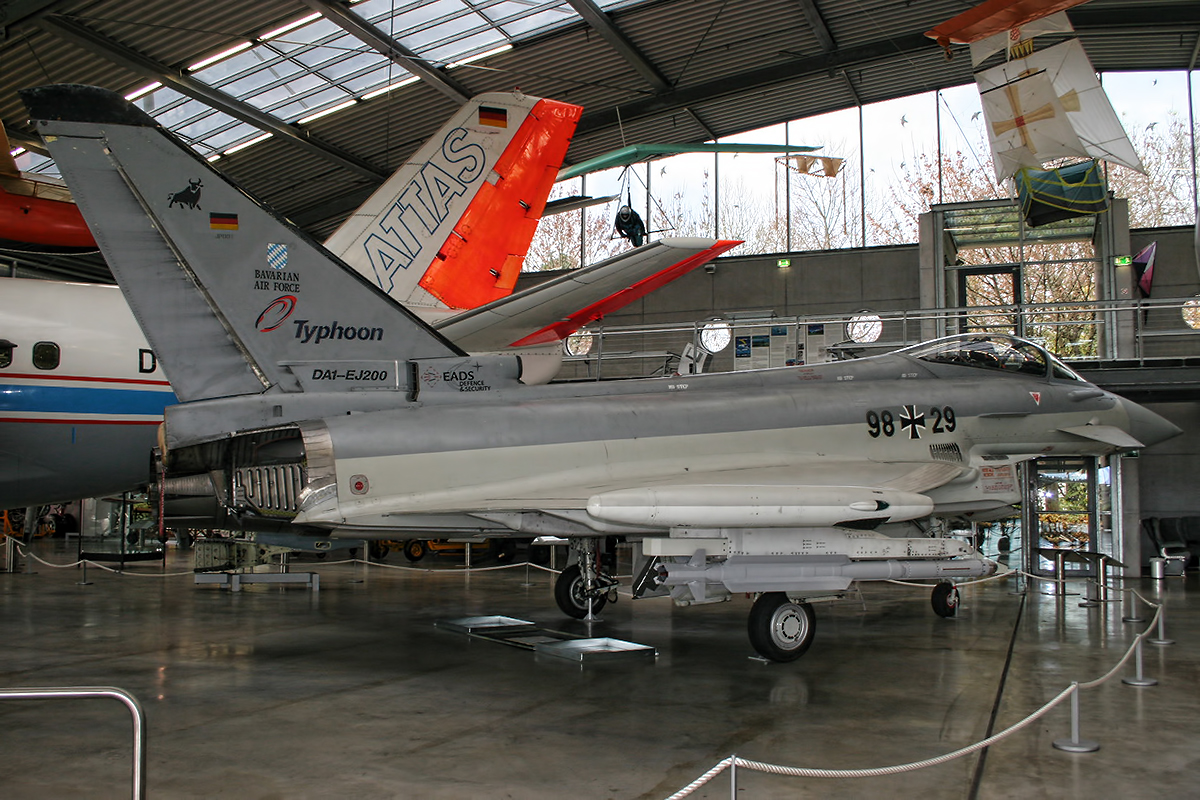
DA1 in 2013

DA1's main role was handling characteristics and engine performance.
DA1 was assembled in 1992 and first flew on 27 March 1994 with Luftwaffe serial 98+29. The military evaluation phase commenced in 1996. In 1997 after 123 flights, DA1's RB199 engines were replaced by EJ200s, it also was refitted with the Martin-Baker Mk.16A ejector seat and a full avionics fit. Following these modifications it rejoined the flight test programme in 1999. Following the loss of DA6, DA1 was transferred to Spain to undertake the remaining development work including IRIS-T trials.
The aircraft was retired on 21 December 2005, eleven years, eight months, and 24 days after its first flight.
It is on display at the Flugwerft Schleißheim (external site of the Deutsches Museum) near Munich, Germany.

DA2 United Kingdom
DA2 undertook envelope expansion, flight control assessment and load trials. The aircraft first flew on 6 April 1994 as ZH588. The flight control assessment included development of the Eurofighter's "carefree handling". On 23 December 1997 DA2 became the first Eurofighter to achieve Mach 2 and in January 1998 undertook refuelling trials with a RAF VC10. Like DA1, DA2 was upgraded in 1998 with new engines, ejector seat and avionics and rejoined the test programme in August. In 2000 the aircraft was covered with 490 pressure transducers; due to the fact that they were covered by black pads and had associated wiring the aircraft was painted in a gloss black scheme. The pressure transducers measured the effects of various weapons loads and external fuel tanks. In 2002 the aircraft undertook ASRAAM trials, completed carefree handling trials and commenced DASS decoy trials.
Now retired and on display in the Milestones of Flight Gallery at the Royal Air Force Museum London at Hendon.

DA3 Italy
Weapons systems development.

DA4 United Kingdom

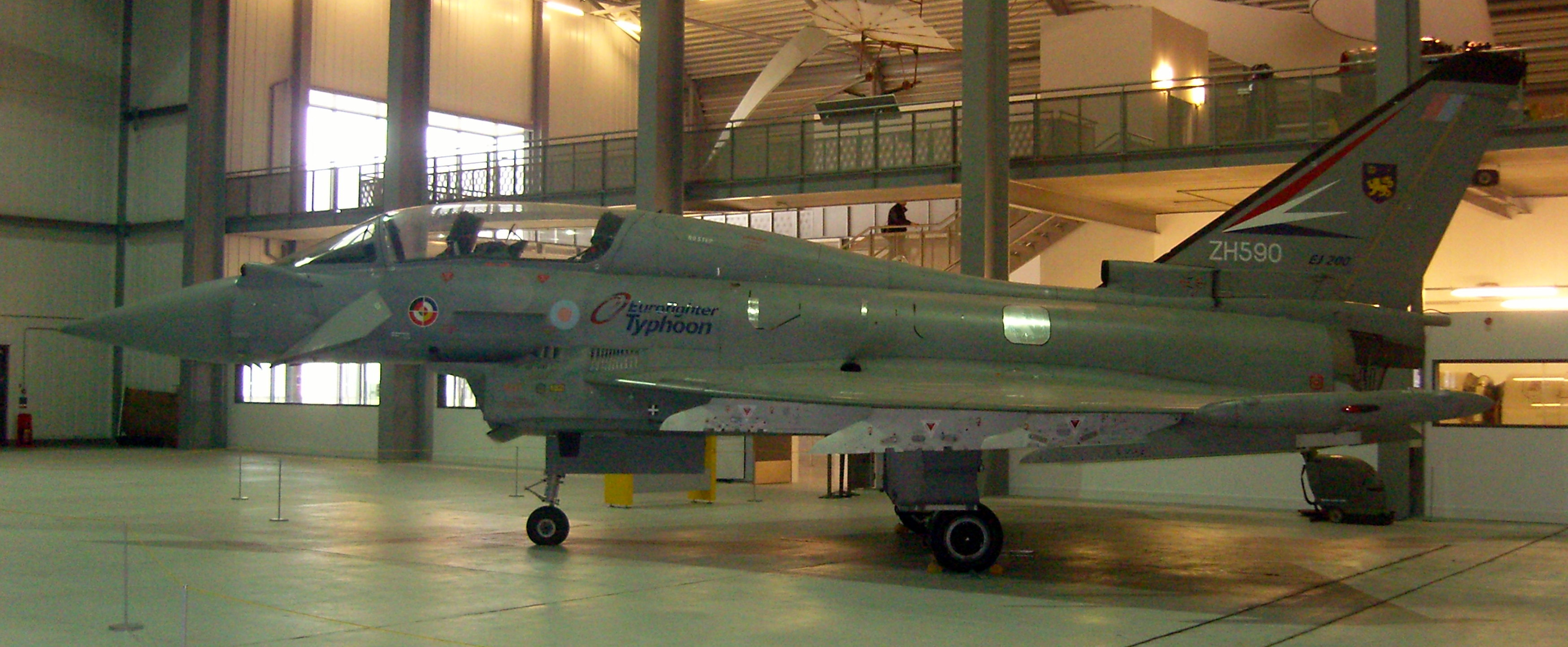
DA4 in 2011

Twin-seat, radar and avionics development, previously on display between 2009 and 2024 at the Imperial War Museum Duxford. Repossessed by the Royal Air Force to serve as a training aid at RAF Cosford.

DA5 Germany
Radar and avionics development, being upgraded to Tranche 2 standard. German and Spanish contract involved upgrading 130 Eurofighter Typhoon tranche 2 to latest AESA radar and avionics.

DA6 Spain
Twin-seat, airframe development and handling. DA6 was lost in a crash in Spain in November 2002 after both engines failed. EADS Germany's DA1 was transferred to EADS-CASA.

DA7 Italy
Navigation, avionics and missile carriage. Now retired in Cameri IAF.

== Instrumented production aircraft ==
The instrumented production aircraft (IPA) are five production standard aircraft fitted with telemetry instruments for dedicated flight testing and further systems development.

- IPA1 United Kingdom Defensive Aids Sub System (DASS).
- IPA2 Italy Air-to-surface weapons integration.
- IPA3 Germany Air-to-air weapons integration.
- IPA4 Spain Air-to-surface weapons integration and environmental development.
- IPA5 United Kingdom Air-to-surface and air-to-air weapons integration.
- IPA6 United Kingdom Converted Series Production Aircraft (BS031)—Tranche 2 Computer Systems.
- IPA7 Germany Converted Series Production Aircraft (GS0029)—Full Tranche 2 Standard.
- IPA8 Germany E-Scan radar, enhanced weapon integration and improvements to mission equipment.

== Series production aircraft ==
These are the operational and training aircraft. The model is known as Typhoon in the United Kingdom and export markets and as EF-2000 in Germany, Italy and Spain. However, all Italian aircraft carry the "Typhoon" logo on their tails.

=== Tranche 1 ===
Initial Operational Capability, Basic Air Defence Capability

Block 1
Air-to-ground capabilities
Block 2
Air-to-air capabilities
Block 5
Air-to-air and air-to-ground capabilities, Full Operational Capability (FOC) standard. All Tranche 1 aircraft are being upgraded to Block 5 capability through the Retrofit 2 (R2) programme. Under the R2 upgrade, the aircraft are receiving structural upgrades (notably in the fin-tip area), a revised fuel system with enhanced transfer rates, new software and precision air-to-ground capability.

=== Tranche 2 ===
New hardware standard with new mission computer and EuroFIRST PIRATE

Block 8
Enhanced multirole capabilities
Block 10
Enhanced Operational Capability (EOC) 1, improved DASS, IFF Mode 5, Rangeless ACMI

Air/Air—AIM-120C-5 AMRAAM, IRIS-T digital
Air/Ground—GBU-24, GPS-guided weapons, ALARM, Paveway III & IV, Rafael LITENING III

Block 15
Enhanced Operational Capability (EOC) 2

Air/Air—METEOR,
Air/Ground—TAURUS, Storm Shadow, Brimstone

Block 20
Enhanced Operational Capability (EOC) 3

=== Tranche 3A ===
Incorporating AESA, and hardware support for EOC 4
Both variants include conformal fuel tanks, fibre optic cabling and computer upgrade, defensive system upgrades such as DASS Praetorian EW suite. The Tranche 3A variant came with the Captor-M mechanically scanned array radar while later 3As that were made for export for Kuwait and Qatar was equipped with Captor-E Mk0 AESA radar. A further upgraded variant called Tranche 3B was cancelled.
Tranche 3A of Kuwait Air Force is the first serial production batch to receive Captor-E during manufacturing.

Air/Ground—SPEAR 3, Marte-ER, LITENING IV & V

=== Tranche 4 ===
Unspecified upgrades building upon Tranche 3A specifications.
Tranche 4 is equipped with CAPTOR E AESA radar, improved avionics for weapon compatibility. According to Dirk Hoke, CEO Airbus Defence and Space, "The new Tranche 4 Eurofighter is currently the most modern European-built combat aircraft with a service life well beyond 2060." As part of German Eurofighter Typhoon contract, Hensoldt will produce AESA radar for Luftwaffe Eurofighter.
Germany ordered thirty single-seater and eight twin-seater Tranche 4 Eurofighters in late 2020 with cost of €5.4 billion under the Quadriga contract. 15 of these are to be delivered as Eurofighter EK Step 1. Spain ordered 20 Tranche 4 in June 2022 under the Halcón I and another 25 as part of Halcón II in 2024. Italy ordered up to 24 Tranche 4 Eurofighters in 2024. Türkiye ordered 20 with an option for another 20 in 2025. The German and Spanish Tranche 4 are to be delivered with the ECRS Mk1, the Italian Eurofighters are to be delivered with the ECRS Mk0.

=== Tranche 5 ===
Latest production standard with enhanced avionics and sensor suite
Tranche 5 is a further development with updated avionics compatible with new computing architecture, more powerful on-board computers and an open software structure that will enable future system and weapon integrations as well as significantly faster data fusion. Also a revised cockpit with a large-format multi-field display will be fielded.
Germany ordered 20 fighters with deliveries beginning in 2030. At least 15 are to be delivered as Eurofighter EK.

Turkish Eurofighters are to be delivered with the ECRS Mk2.

== Operators ==
=== Italian Air Force aircraft ===
As of July 2006 the Italian Air Force (Aeronautica Militare Italiana) had one EF-2000 wing, 4º Stormo (4th Wing), which received its first aircraft on 19 February 2004. The 36º Stormo received its first Typhoon on 1 October 2007. By 2018 the Italian Air Force had three Eurofighter wings.

=== Qatar Emiri Air Force aircraft ===
On 25 August 2022 three newly built Eurofighter Typhoons jets destined to the QEAF (Qatar Emiri Air Force) departed the BAE Systems factory at Warton, UK, to Qatar on their delivery flight to Tamim Airbase, near Dukhan, approximately 80 kilometres west of Doha via Athens.

=== Spanish Air Force aircraft ===
As of December 2006 the Spanish Air Force (Ejército del Aire) has one squadron of aircraft. The first aircraft was delivered to Wing 11 in October 2003 at Moron Air Base, Spain. In Spanish service, the aircraft is designated the C.16 Typhoon.

=== Luftwaffe aircraft ===
As of October 2006 Germany had two active EF-2000 fighter wings, Jagdgeschwader 73 and Jagdgeschwader 74. JG 73 began converting to the Eurofighter in April 2004. JG 74 received its first aircraft on 25 June 2006.

=== Royal Air Force aircraft ===
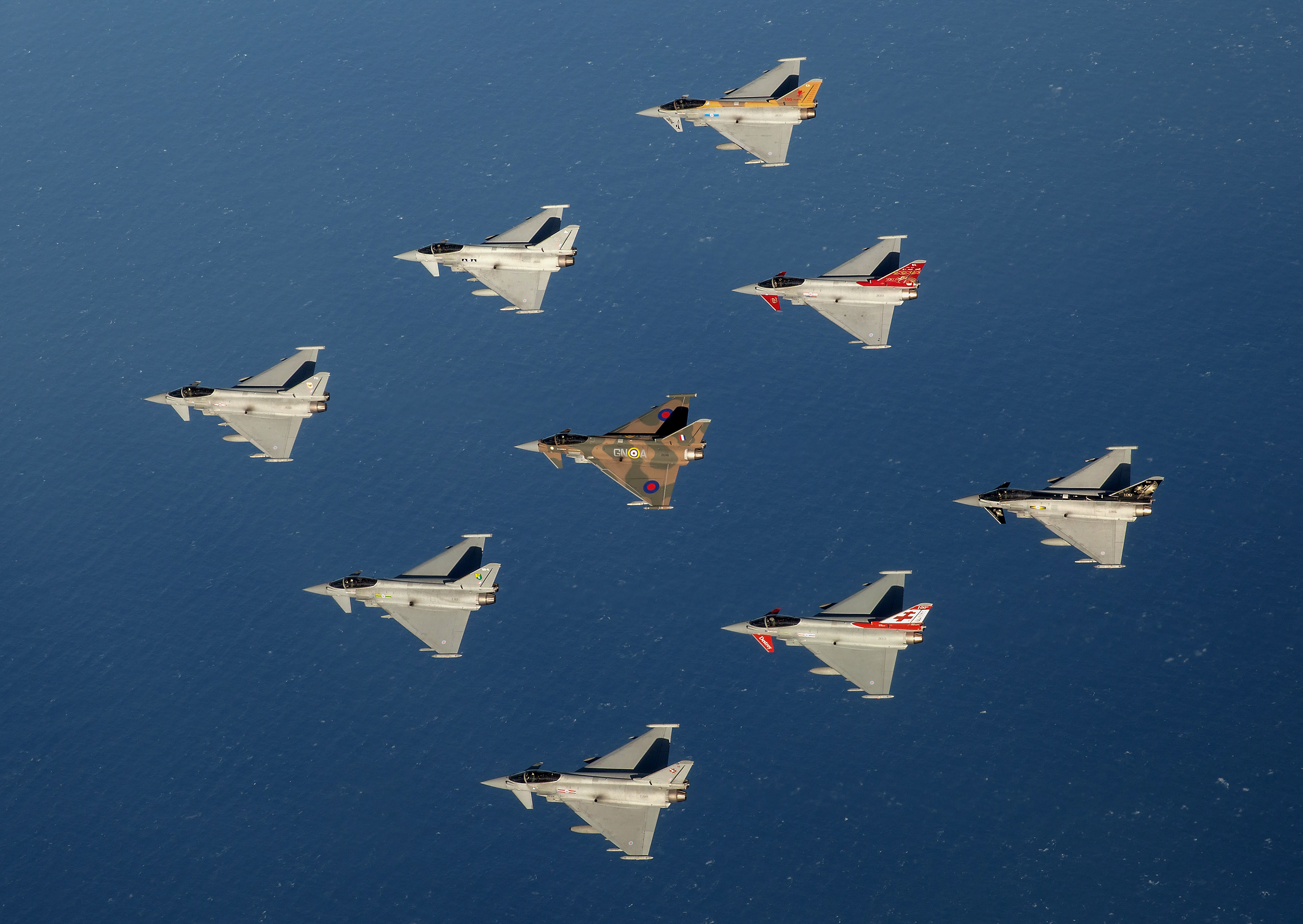
Typhoons representing the RAF Typhoon squadrons—1 Sqn, 2 Sqn, 3 Sqn, 6 Sqn, 29 Sqn, 11 Sqn, 41 Sqn, 1435 Flight, and BOB75 in the centre to commemorate the Battle of Britain

The Typhoon replaced the RAF's Tornado F3 (fighter) and Jaguar (ground attack) forces. They will equip five front-line squadrons, one front-line flight and one reserve squadron, the Operational Conversion Unit (OCU).

Typhoon T1
The Typhoon T1 is a Tranche 1, batch 1 two-seat trainer.
The first Typhoon T1 is one of the Instrumented Production Aircraft (IPA1) and remains part of the BAE fleet. The aircraft's maiden flight was on 15 April 2002. The official in service date for the first RAF Typhoon T1, serial ZJ803, was 30 June 2003. Formal delivery occurred on 18 December at which point 17 Sqn began a full flying programme.
The first squadrons, No. 17 OEU and No. 29 OCU Sqns, moved to RAF Coningsby in 2005 to begin establishing an initial operational capability (IOC).

In 2001, it was announced that the Royal Air Force (RAF) would not use the aircraft's internal 27 mm Mauser cannon. This was due to a desire to save money by removing gun support costs, ammunition stocks, training costs, etc. The gun was also deemed unnecessary since the missile armament was believed to be adequate in the Typhoon's fighter role. However, because removal of the cannon would affect the aircraft's flight characteristics, requiring modification of the aircraft's flight software the RAF decided all its Typhoons would be fitted with the cannon but that it would not be used or supported. The service argued that this would save money by reducing the requirement for ground equipment, removing training costs and avoiding the fatigue effects of firing the cannon. The RAF maintained the option to activate the cannons at very short notice were operational requirements to change. However, in a third change of policy, The Daily Telegraph reported on 3 October 2006 that the RAF will fully utilise the cannon.

Typhoon T1A
Typhoon T1As are Tranche 1, batch 2 two-seat trainers. There would not normally be a different designation for a different aircraft batch; however, the Batch 2 aircraft has a fuel system modification to fix a fuel gauge problem identified in the development aircraft fleet.
Typhoon F2
The F2 is the single-seat fighter variant. The first F2 is IPA5 and also remains with BAE, its first flight was 6 June 2002.
The first operational squadron, No. 3, formed at RAF Cottesmore on 31 March 2006 and moved to its new base RAF Coningsby the following day. No. 11 squadron, the second operational squadron received its first aircraft (ZJ931) on 9 October 2006.

As of June 2018, the RAF had bought 53 Tranche 1 Typhoons. The UK agreed to approve production of "Tranche 2" in December 2004, this tranche will see the RAF receive a further 89 aircraft, bringing its Typhoon inventory to 144. This followed protracted negotiations regarding the early introduction of ground attack capabilities of the aircraft and hence its swing-role capability. While this was always planned it was intended to come at a much later date.

Typhoon T3
Two-seat Block 5 or later aircraft (built or upgraded from T1) are known as Typhoon T3s.
Typhoon FGR4
Single-seat Block 5 or later aircraft (built or upgraded from F2) are known as Typhoon FGR4s. The new mark number represents the increased capabilities of the Block 5 aircraft (fighter/ground attack/reconnaissance). The FGR4 has from June 2008 achieved the required standard for multi-role operations.

As of June 2018, the RAF has 67 Tranche 2 Typhoons and has contracted to purchase 40 Tranche 3 Typhoons. 107 Tranche 2 and 3 Typhoons will be modified via "Project Centurion", allowing them to utilise Meteor missiles, Brimstone and Storm Shadow missiles. 24 Tranche 1 Typhoons will be retained for UK Quick Reaction Alert purposes, and will not be modified under Centurion. No. IX Squadron, based at RAF Lossiemouth, retains the Tranche 1 Typhoon for QRA purposes but also serves the purpose of acting as an aggressor aircraft, similar to that of the USAF Lockheed Martin F-16 Fighting Falcon. These aircraft worked in conjunction with the 100 Squadron BAe Hawk T.1 aircraft based at RAF Leeming, providing air combat training and dogfight training to RAF and Royal Navy pilots.

In December 2021, the Ministry of Defence stated RAF Typhoons had shot down a drone in Syria, making this their first operational air-to-air engagement and the RAF's first operational kill since 1982.

== Proposed versions ==
=== Navalised Typhoon ===
Owing to the withdrawal of France from the Eurofighter 2000 project, in part due to France's desire to have a greater role in the development and marketing of the aircraft, the pursuit of a naval Typhoon has never seriously been considered. However, a navalised variant of the aircraft was first proposed in the late 1990s as a potential solution to the UK Royal Navy's need for a Future Carrier-Borne Aircraft (FCBA) for its new (Queen Elizabeth-class) aircraft carriers.

In January 2001, the UK Ministry of Defence formally discounted the option of a navalised Eurofighter for its new aircraft carriers, in favour of the Joint Strike Fighter, which promised to be a more capable, versatile, low-cost and stealthy aircraft that would enter into service circa 2012—a date that tied in well with the in-service date for the new UK aircraft carriers as it stood at that time. The Typhoon, as well as the F/A-18E, Rafale M and an advanced variant of the Harrier were rejected by the United Kingdom on "cost effectiveness grounds", selecting the Short Take Off & Vertical Landing (STOVL) variant of the Joint Strike Fighter in 2002 as the primary option for Fleet Air Arm usage. The STOVL variant of the JSF would later be designated the F-35B Lightning II, entering service with the Fleet Air Arm in 2018.

While the navalised version of the Typhoon was ruled out by the MoD by 2011, there has been limited interest expressed by other nations, such as India, in adapting the Typhoon for aircraft carrier operations.

The proposed variant design would enable the Typhoon to operate from carriers on a Short Take-Off, Barrier Arrested Recovery (STOBAR) basis, using a 'ski jump' ramp for aircraft launch and arresting gear for conventional landing.

In February 2011, BAE debuted a navalised Typhoon in response to the Indian tender. The model offered is STOBAR capable, corresponding to the Indian Navy's future aircraft carrier, INS Vikrant. The changes needed to enable the Typhoon to launch by ski-jump and recover by arrestor hook added about 500 kg to the airframe, however this is now thought to be substantially more given the Typhoon's "unfriendly" design in terms of adapting the airframe to suit sustained naval operations.

=== Typhoon EK ===
On 5 November 2019, Kurt Rossner, Head of Combat Aircraft Systems at Airbus, proposed an Electronic Combat Role (ECR)/Suppression of Enemy Air Defenses (SEAD) capability for the aircraft. The Typhoon ECR/SEAD would be configured with two Escort Jammer pods under the wings and two Emitter Location Systems built into the wingtips. Armament configuration would include four MBDA Meteor, two IRIS-T and six SPEAR-EW in addition to three drop tanks. The plane would be a two-seat variant carrying a mission specialist with access to dedicated electronic warfare and mission control screens.

On 14 March 2022, Christine Lambrecht, German Defense Minister announced that the German government would fund development of the Eurofighter ECR version.

On 29 November 2023, what was now being referred to as Eurofighter EK (German: Elektronischer Kampf, lit. 'Electronic Combat') was approved by the Budget Committee of the Bundestag. According to the German Air Force and Airbus, 15 existing Eurofighters were to be equipped with the Saab AB Arexis EW suite and Northrop Grumman AGM-88E Advanced Anti-Radiation Guided Missile (AARGM).

== See also ==
Related development

- British Aerospace EAP
