= Keith Blount =

Royal Navy Admiral (born 1966)

Admiral Sir Keith Blount KCB OBE FRAeS
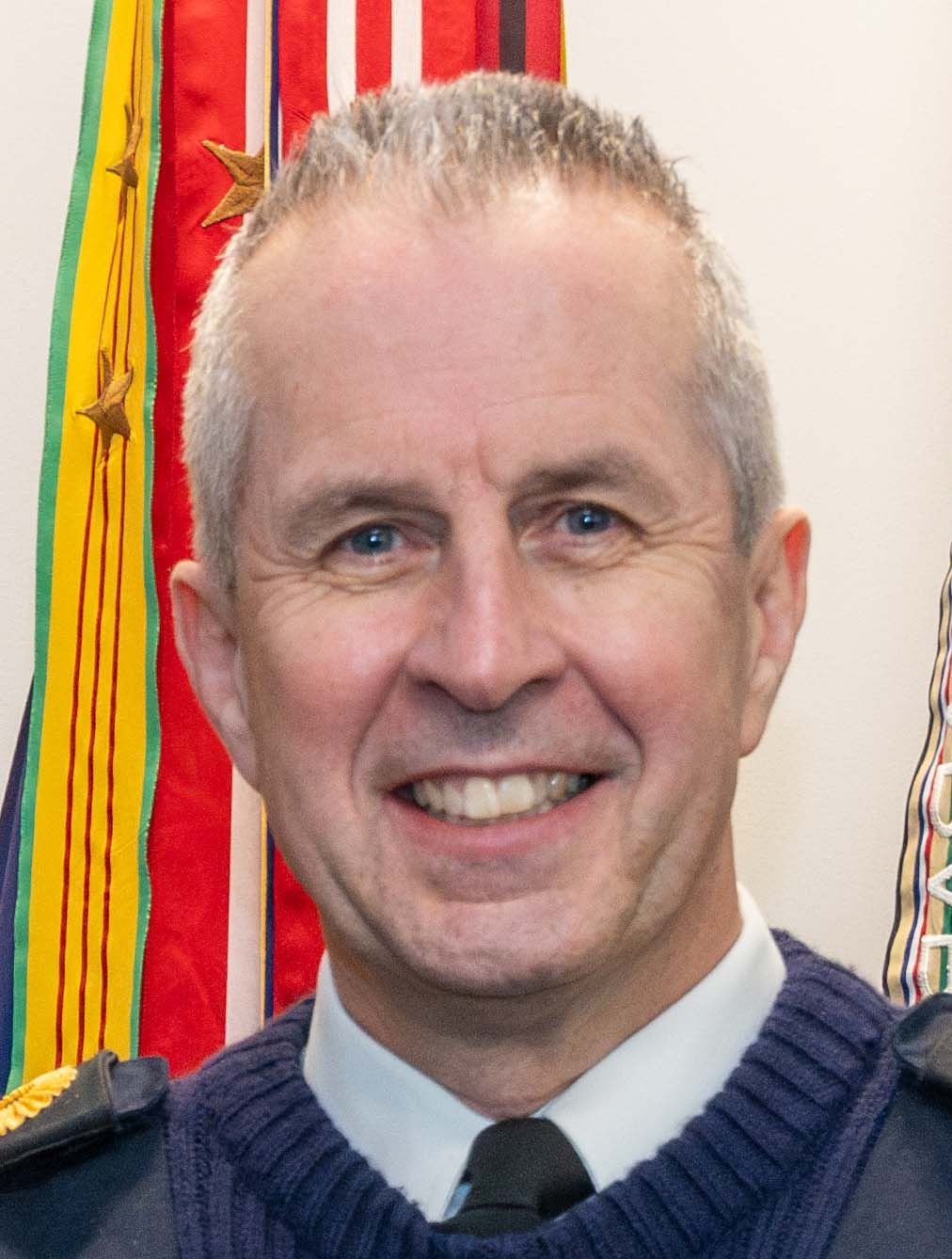
- Blount in 2025
- Born: 22 June 1966 (age 60); Plymouth, England
- Military career
- Allegiance: United Kingdom
- Branch: Royal Navy
- Service years: 1984–2026
- Rank: Admiral
- Service number: C031931J
- Commands: DSACEUR; Allied Maritime Command; Fleet Air Arm; HMS Ocean; HMS Somerset; HMS Anglesey
- Conflicts: Iraq War
- Awards: Knight Commander of the Order of the Bath; Officer of the Order of the British Empire; Officer of the Legion of Merit (United States)

Admiral Sir Keith Edward Blount, KCB, OBE, FRAeS (born 22 June 1966) is a retired senior Royal Navy officer and pilot, who from 2023 to 2026 served as NATO's Deputy Supreme Allied Commander Europe. He was Assistant Chief of Naval Staff (Aviation, Amphibious Capability and Carriers) and head of the Fleet Air Arm from 2015 to 2019. He served as Commander Allied Maritime Command, NATO, from 2019 to 2023.

== Early life and education ==
Blount was born on 22 June 1966 in Plymouth, England. He was educated at Plymstock School, a state secondary school in Plymouth. He completed a Master of Arts degree in Defence Studies from King's College London in 2004.

== Naval career ==
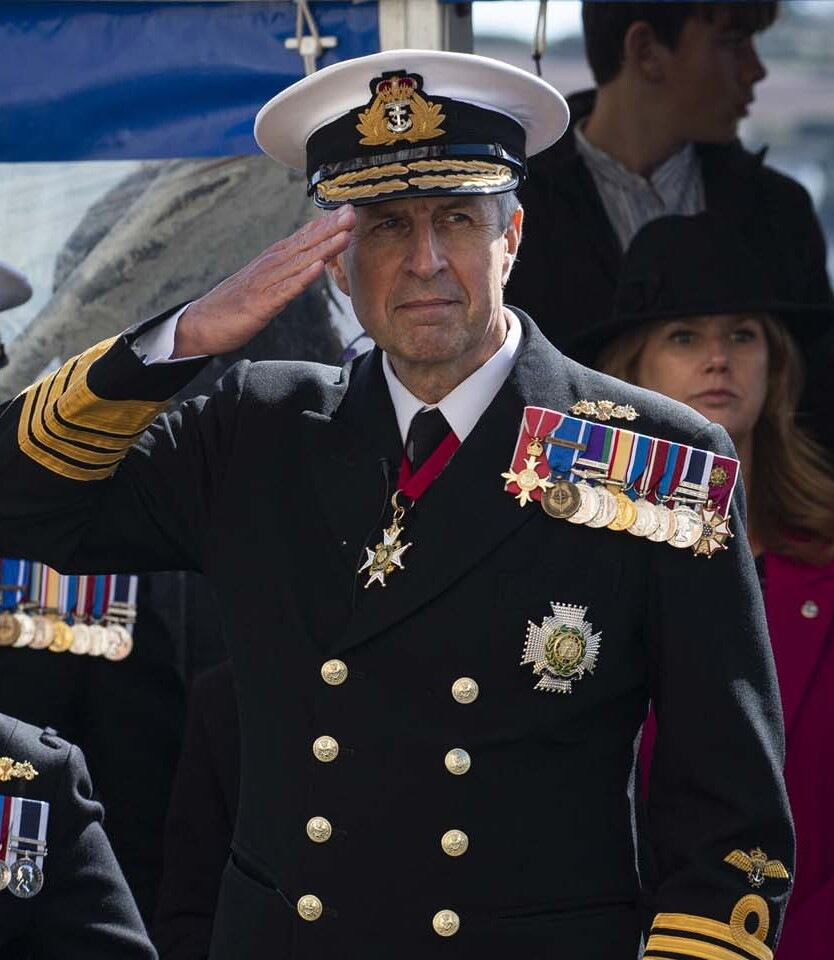
Admiral Blount taking the salute at BRNC in 2023

Blount joined the Royal Navy in 1984, and qualified as a helicopter pilot in 1986. Following training, he served with 826, 810, 771, 705 and 820 Naval Air Squadrons. He was promoted to captain on 1 January 2010, and his commands have included HMS Ocean, the Iraqi Maritime Task Group, and the United Kingdom's Maritime Component in Bahrain. He was appointed an Officer of the Order of the British Empire (OBE) in the 2011 Queen's Birthday Honours. He was promoted to commodore on 27 August 2013.

Blount was promoted to rear admiral on 29 May 2015, and served as Assistant Chief of Naval Staff (Aviation, Amphibious Capability and Carriers) and Rear Admiral Fleet Air Arm from May 2015 to February 2019. He was elected a Fellow of the Royal Aeronautical Society in 2016, and appointed a Companion of the Order of the Bath in the 2018 New Year Honours. He became Commander Allied Maritime Command, effective 20 May 2019, and was promoted to vice admiral on the same day.

It was announced in November 2022 that Blount would become Deputy Supreme Allied Commander Europe (DSACEUR) in July 2023. He was promoted to the rank of full admiral on 17 July 2023, as he started in the position. He stepped down in March 2026, and was succeeded by Johnny Stringer as DSACEUR. He retired from the Royal Navy on 20 June 2026, at which point there were no active duty admirals in the Royal Navy.

== Personal life ==
In 2007, Blount married Deborah. She was a police officer. Together they have two daughters.

== Honours and decorations ==
Blount has been awarded the Naval Long Service and Good Conduct Medal with two clasps. While a commodore, Blount was awarded the Legion of Merit in the degree of officer by the President of the United States "in recognition of meritorious, gallant, and distinguished services during coalition operations in the field". Blount was appointed a Companion of the Order of the Bath (CB) in the 2018 New Year Honours, and promoted to a Knight Commander of the Order of the Bath (KCB) in the 2023 New Year Honours.

Ribbon	Description	Notes
	Order of the Bath	Appointed Companion in 2018; Appointed Knight Companion in 2023
	Order of the British Empire	Appointed Officer in 2011
	Officer of the Legion of Merit	Appointed in 2023

Military offices
Preceded by Russell Harding	Rear Admiral Fleet Air Arm; 2015–2019	Succeeded by Martin Connell
Preceded by Clive Johnstone	Commander Allied Maritime Command; 2019–2023	Succeeded by Michael Utley
Preceded by Sir Tim Radford	Deputy Supreme Allied Commander Europe; 2023–2026	Succeeded by Sir John Stringer
