= RAF Coningsby =

Royal Air Force main operating base in Lincolnshire, England

RAF Coningsby
- Near Coningsby, Lincolnshire in England
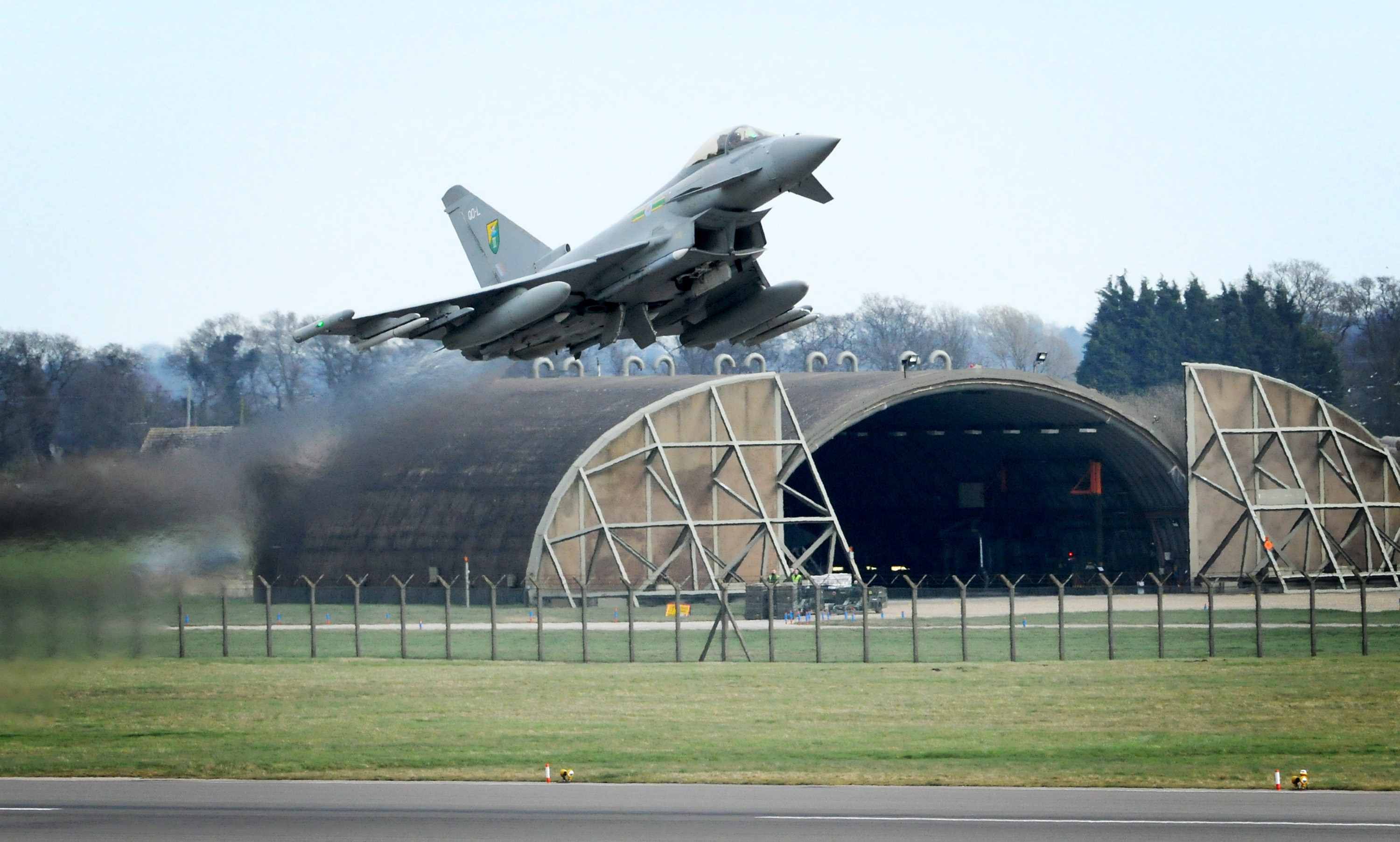
- A Eurofighter Typhoon takes off from RAF Coningsby.

- Loyalty binds me

Site information
- Type: Main Operating Base
- Owner: Ministry of Defence
- Operator: Royal Air Force
- Controlled by: No. 1 Group (Air Combat)
- Open to the public: Access to BBMF Hangar only
- Condition: Operational
- Website: Official website

Location
- Shown within Lincolnshire
- Coordinates: 53°05′35″N 000°09′58″W
- Grid reference: TF225565
- Area: 420 hectares (1,000 acres)

Site history
- Built: 1940
- In use: 1940 – present

Garrison information
- Current commander: Group Captain Andrew Hampshire
- Occupants: No. 3 Squadron; No. 11 Squadron; No. 12 Squadron; No. 29 Squadron OCU; No. 41 (Test and Evaluation) Squadron; Battle of Britain Memorial Flight; See Based units section for full list.

Airfield information
- Identifiers: IATA: QCY, ICAO: EGXC, WMO: 03391
- Elevation: 24 feet (7 m) AMSL
Runways
Direction	Length and surface
07/25	2,744 metres (9,003 ft) Asphalt and Concrete
- Source: RAF Coningsby Defence Aerodrome Manual

Royal Air Force Coningsby or RAF Coningsby (IATA: QCY, ICAO: EGXC), is a Royal Air Force station located 8.5 miles (14 km) south-west of Horncastle, and 10 miles (16 km) north-west of Boston, in the East Lindsey district of Lincolnshire, England. It is a Main Operating Base of the RAF and home to three front-line Eurofighter Typhoon FGR4 units, No. 3 Squadron, No. 11 Squadron and No. 12 Squadron. In support of front-line units, No. 29 Squadron is the Typhoon Operational Conversion Unit and No. 41 Squadron is the Typhoon Test and Evaluation Squadron. Coningsby is also the home of the Battle of Britain Memorial Flight (BBMF) which operates a variety of historic RAF aircraft.

== History ==
=== Second World War ===
Plans for an airfield at Coningsby began in 1937 as part of the RAF's expansion plan. However progress in the compulsory purchase of the land was slow and delayed the start of work for two years. The station opened during the Second World War on 4 November 1940 under No. 5 Group, part of RAF Bomber Command. The first flying unit, No. 106 Squadron with the Handley Page Hampden medium bomber, arrived in February 1941, with active operations taking place the following month when four Hampdens bombed Cologne in Germany. The squadron was joined in April 1941 by No. 97 Squadron equipped with Avro Manchester medium bombers. In May 1942, aircraft from Coningsby participated in the 'Thousand Bomber' raid on Cologne.

The original grass runways were found to be unsuitable for heavy bomber operations so the station was closed for nearly a year between September 1942 and August 1943, whilst paved runways were laid in preparation for accommodating such aircraft. At the same time further hangars were constructed.

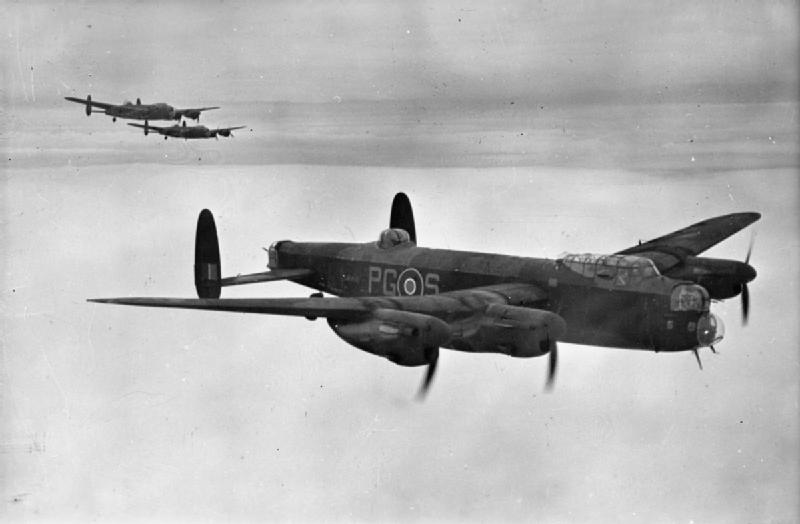
Three Avro Lancaster B.IIIs of No. 619 Squadron, airborne from RAF Coningsby whilst based there during 1944.

The first unit to return was the now-famous No. 617 'Dambusters' Squadron. Equipped with Avro Lancaster heavy bombers, the squadron was stationed at Coningsby from August 1943. Due to its specialist nature, the Dambusters carried out limited operations whilst at Coningsby, with the most notable being Operation Garlic, a failed raid targeting the Dortmund-Ems canal in Germany, when five out of the eight Lancasters on the mission failed to return home. As the squadron required more space, it moved to nearby RAF Woodhall Spa in January 1944, swapping places with another Lancaster unit, No. 619 Squadron, which itself later moved on to RAF Dunholme Lodge.

Further Lancaster squadrons were based at Coningsby during the final months of the war, including No. 61 Squadron from RAF Skellingthorpe, No. 83 Squadron and No. 97 Squadron.

=== Post war ===
Following the Second World War, Coningsby was home to the Mosquito-equipped No. 109 Squadron and No. 139 Squadron, then became part of No. 3 Group, with Boeing Washington aircraft from 1950. On 17 August 1953 52-year-old Air Vice-Marshal William Brook, the Air Officer Commanding of No. 3 Group, took off from the base in a Gloster Meteor, and crashed into a Dutch barn at Bradley, Staffordshire.

=== Jet aircraft ===
The airfield received its first jet aircraft—the English Electric Canberra—in 1953. During 1956, the station expanded with the runway being extended. Avro Vulcans arrived in 1962, then transferred to RAF Cottesmore in November 1964.

From 1964 to 1966, the station had been initially designated to receive the proposed RAF strike aircraft, the advanced BAC TSR-2, which was cancelled in April 1965 by the Labour Government. The TSR2 was planned to join No. 40 Squadron at Coningsby in 1968 to replace the Canberra.

=== Phantoms ===
The TSR2's intended replacement—the American General Dynamics F-111 Aardvark—was shelved on 16 January 1968 when its costs overshot the UK's budget (it would have cost £425m for 50 aircraft). The TSR2 had large development costs, whereas the F-111 (also known as Tactical Fighter Experimental, or TFX) could be bought off the shelf. Coningsby was planned to get the F-111K, the RAF version of the F-111; also in the 1966 Defence White Paper, it was intended that the Anglo-French AFVG, later the UKVG, would replace the TSR2 (it did eventually as the Panavia Tornado). 50 F-111Ks were planned with 100 AFVGs (to enter service by 1970); Denis Healey claimed the F-111s and AFVGs would be cheaper than the TSR2 programme (158 aircraft) by £700m. As Minister of Aviation throughout 1965, the Labour MP Roy Jenkins had also wanted to similarly cancel the Olympus-powered Concorde, but the 1962 Anglo-French treaty imposed prohibitively steep financial penalties for cancellation; the Hawker Siddeley P.1154 and HS.681 were cancelled at the same time.

AFVGs were also planned to replace the Buccaneer in the Royal Navy—Tornados were never flown by the Royal Navy, as the carriers for them, the CVA-01s, were cancelled. But the Royal Navy did operate fourteen Phantoms on HMS Ark Royal, until the new smaller carriers entered service—48 Phantoms had been designated for the Fleet Air Arm, with twenty of these ending up at RAF Leuchars, and Ark Royal's Phantoms ended up at Leuchars in 1978. HMS Eagle was never converted to Phantom use as it was deemed too expensive, and the carrier was scrapped in January 1972, with its Sea Vixen aircraft. Another alternative considered by the Labour government in July 1965 for the TSR-2 was to order Rolls-Royce Spey-engined French Mirage IV aircraft, to be known as the Mirage IVS; it would have avionics from the TSR-2, and be partly made by BAC at Warton.

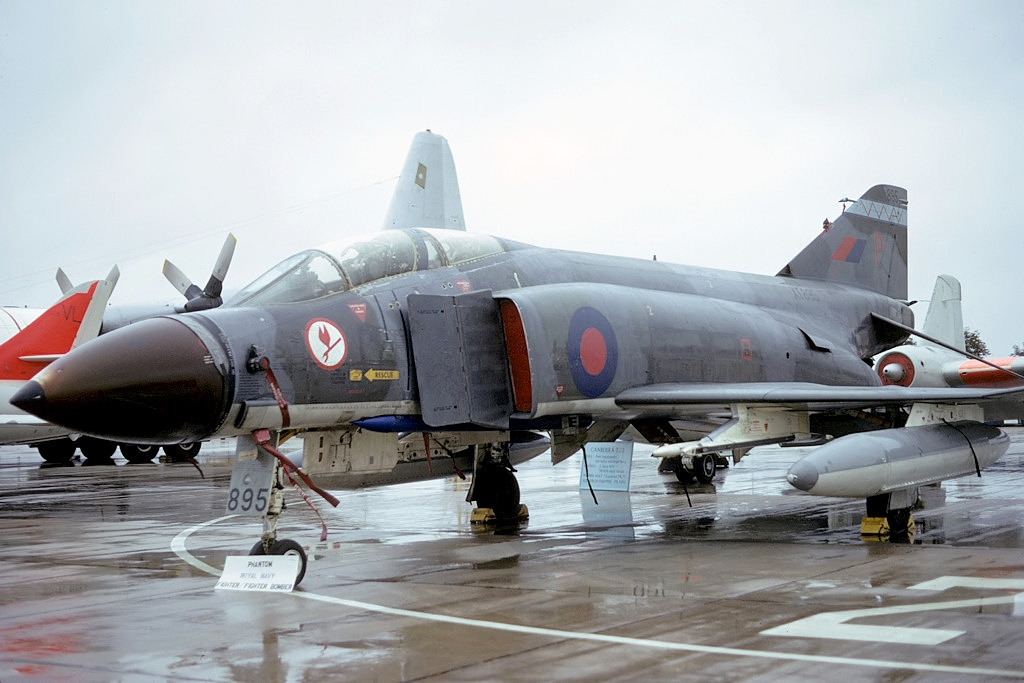
Phantom FGR.2 XT895 from No. 6 Squadron, this was the first squadron to get operational Phantoms in May 1969 at Coningsby; No. 54(F) Squadron received the aircraft in September 1969; both squadrons were disbanded in 1974

Spey-engined Phantoms (the plane the government eventually bought, having been ordered in February 1964 for the Fleet Air Arm, instead of the P.1154) were chosen in 1966 for the station's future as with the scrapping of aircraft carriers the Phantoms were not needed for the Fleet Air Arm, with all RAF Phantom training taking place on the airfield, and the station became part of Fighter Command until December 1967, when it joined Air Support Command as the Phantoms were initially in a ground attack role. Phantoms first saw operational service with the Fleet Air Arm in 1970. The first Phantom FGR2 (Fighter/Ground attack/Reconnaissance) arrived at Coningsby on 23 August 1968, with the first aircrew OCU course (No. 228 OCU) beginning in October 1968. Air-defence Phantoms (FG1) also entered service in 1969 at RAF Leuchars. On 18 May 1970, a Phantom flew from the base non-stop to RAF Tengah in Singapore, covering 8,680 mi (13,970 km) in 14 hours and 14 minutes at an average speed of 602 mph (969 km/h). In April 1968, RAF Strike Command was formed and the airfield was transferred to No. 38 Group.

No. 41(F) Squadron joined in April 1972, and stayed until 1977. The other ground-attack Phantom squadrons (four of them) were at RAF Bruggen. No. 111(F) Squadron replaced their Lightnings (from RAF Wattisham) with Phantoms from 1 October 1974. On 1 January 1975, No. 29(F) Squadron joined and stayed until 1987, when disbanded. On 1 November 1975, No. 23(F) Squadron joined until February 1976, when moved to RAF Wattisham. In March 1976, No. 56(F) Squadron joined until July 1976, then went to Wattisham.

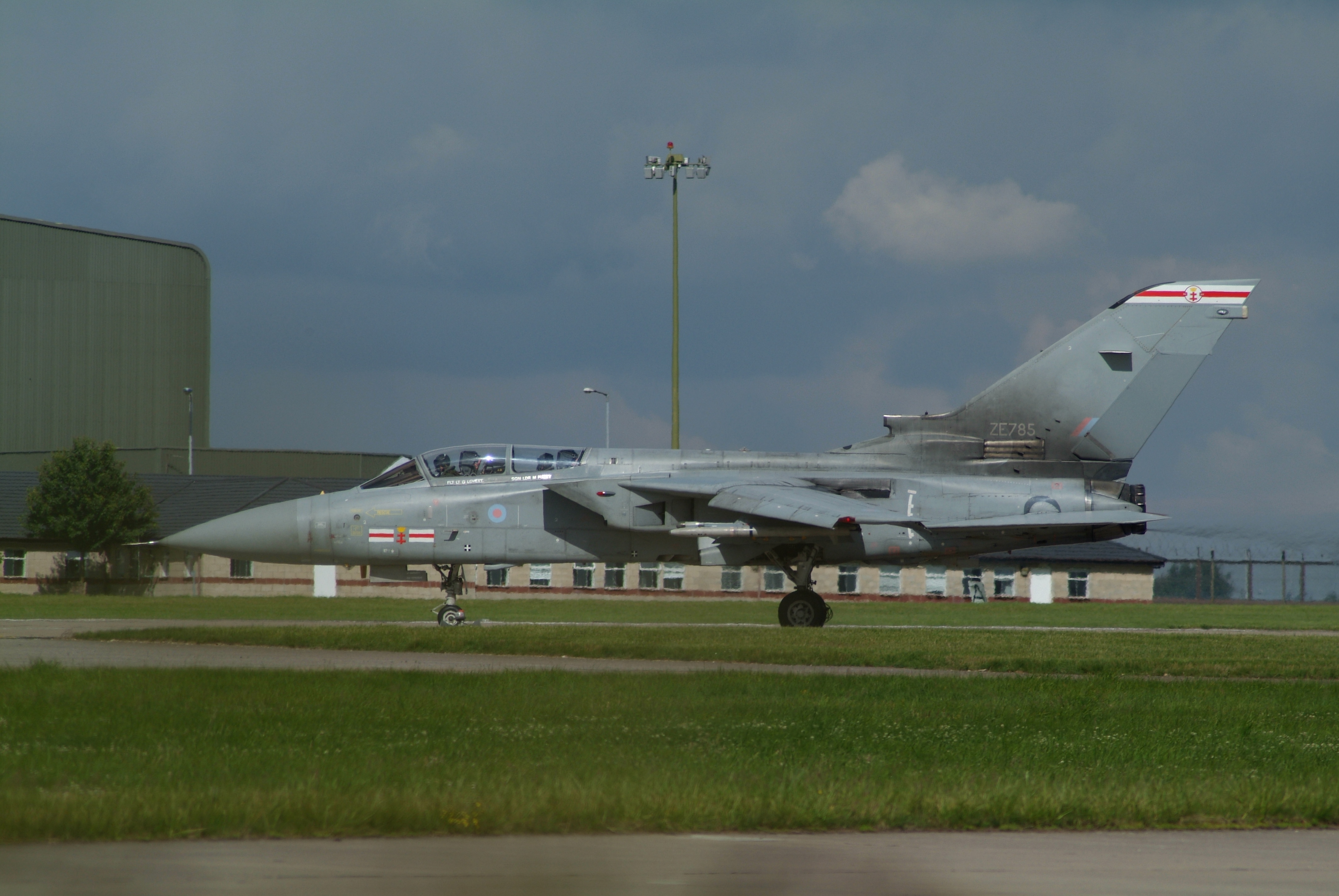
Panavia Tornado F3 ZE785 of No. 41 Squadron in July 2007.

The Phantom's role changed to air defence in October 1974 when the airfield transferred to No. 11 Group in Strike Command, when the SEPECAT Jaguar (situated in Norfolk) took over the ground attack role. No. 111(F) Squadron were the first to take the new air defence Phantoms. During 1975, the UK's air defence transferred to the Phantom FGR.2 from five squadrons of English Electric Lightnings. The UK was covered by NATO Early Warning Area 12. Three Sector Operations Centres were at RAF Buchan, Boulmer and Neatishead; in the 1960s, the UK had the Linesman/Mediator radar system, which was obsolete by the 1970s. No. 29(F) Squadron formed with Phantoms at Coningsby on 1 January 1975; until then the Phantom FG.1 had been operating with the Royal Navy only. On 3 March 1975, a Phantom crashed into a nearby house, with both pilot and navigator ejecting. The Queen visited the station on 30 June 1976.

=== Tornados ===
Panavia Tornado F3 squadrons began to form from November 1984, namely No. 229 OCU/No. 65 Squadron. Tornado training took place until April 1987, when the Phantoms left (to RAF Leuchars) and Coningsby had the first (No. 29(F) Squadron) Tornado air defence squadron.

To accommodate these new aircraft, extensive hardened aircraft shelters (HAS) and support facilities were built. No. 5 Squadron arrived in January 1988, having previously operated the English Electric Lightning.

Exercise Priory took place in October 1985.

During the Gulf War, Tornados from Coningsby were based for three months at Dhahran International Airport to participate in Operation Granby. Tornado engines were serviced on the northern section of the former RAF Woodhall Spa, denoted as RAF Woodhall.

=== Jaguars ===
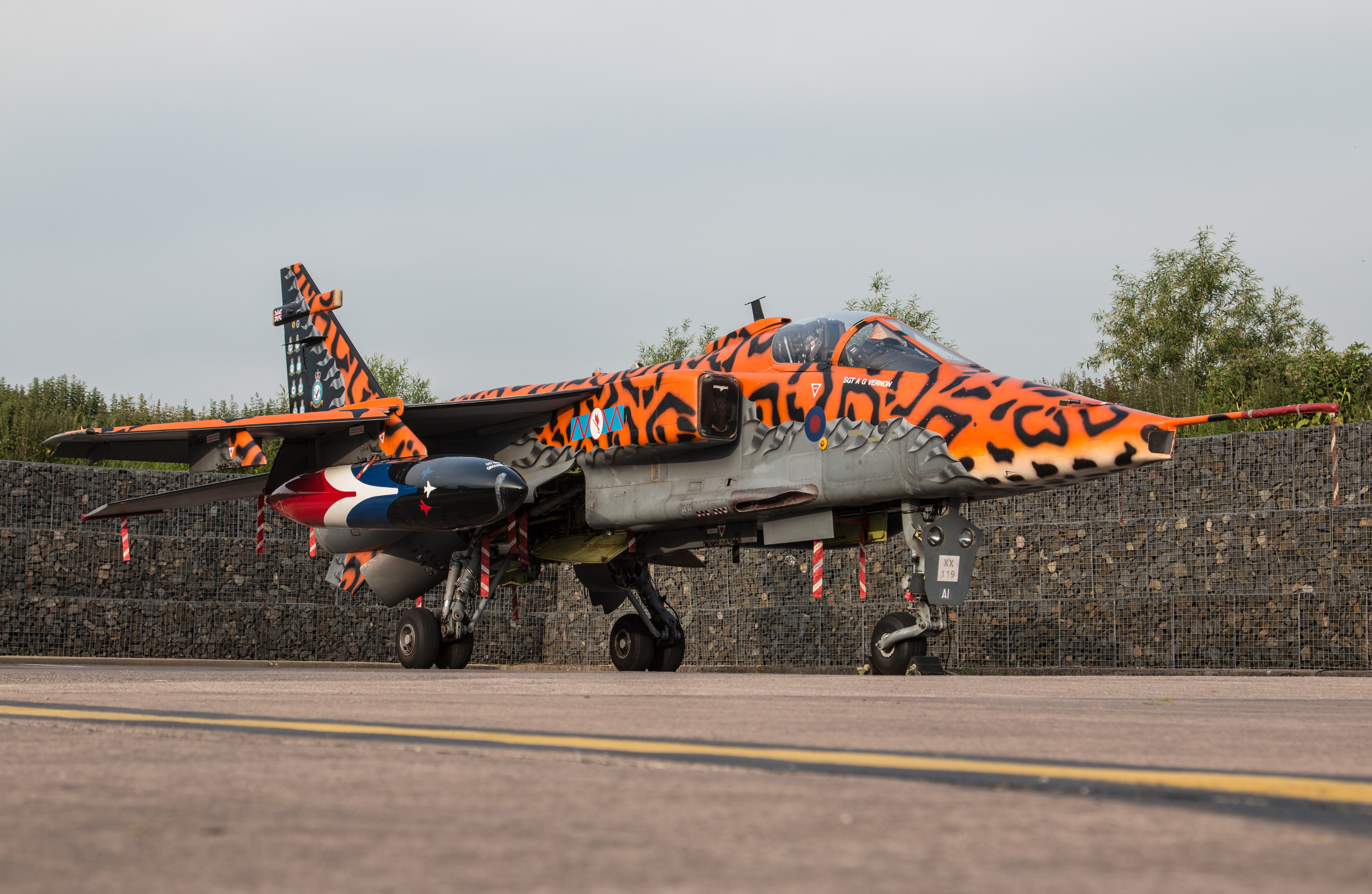
SEPECAT Jaguar GR.3A XX119 was the last Jaguar to arrive at RAF Cosford from Coningsby on 2 July 2007.

With the running down of RAF Coltishall in Norfolk, No. 6 Squadron relocated with their SEPECAT Jaguars to Coningsby on 1 April 2006, where it was planned they would operate from until October 2007. However, on 25 April 2007 it was announced by the Ministry of Defence that the Jaguars would be withdrawn from service on 30 April. May 2007 saw No. 6 Squadron flying their Jaguars to RAF Cosford where they would be utilised by No. 1 SoTT. No. 6 Squadron disbanded on 31 May 2007. Deliveries continued in June and July, with the last Jaguar to arrive at Cosford from Coningsby being XX119 on 2 July 2007.

=== Eurofighter Typhoon ===
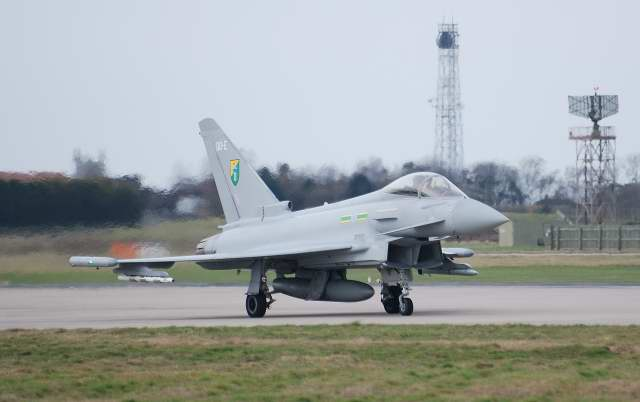
A Eurofighter Typhoon from No. 3(F) Squadron takes off in 2008.

Coningsby was the first airfield to receive the Phantoms, the Tornado ADV and was the first to receive its replacement, the Eurofighter Typhoon. Typhoon arrived in May 2005 with No. 17 Squadron, after the RAF first publicly displayed the aircraft at Coningsby in December 2004. No. 3(F) Squadron moved to RAF Coningsby where it became the first operational front line RAF Typhoon squadron in July 2007 and No. 11(F) Squadron became operational at RAF Coningsby shortly thereafter.

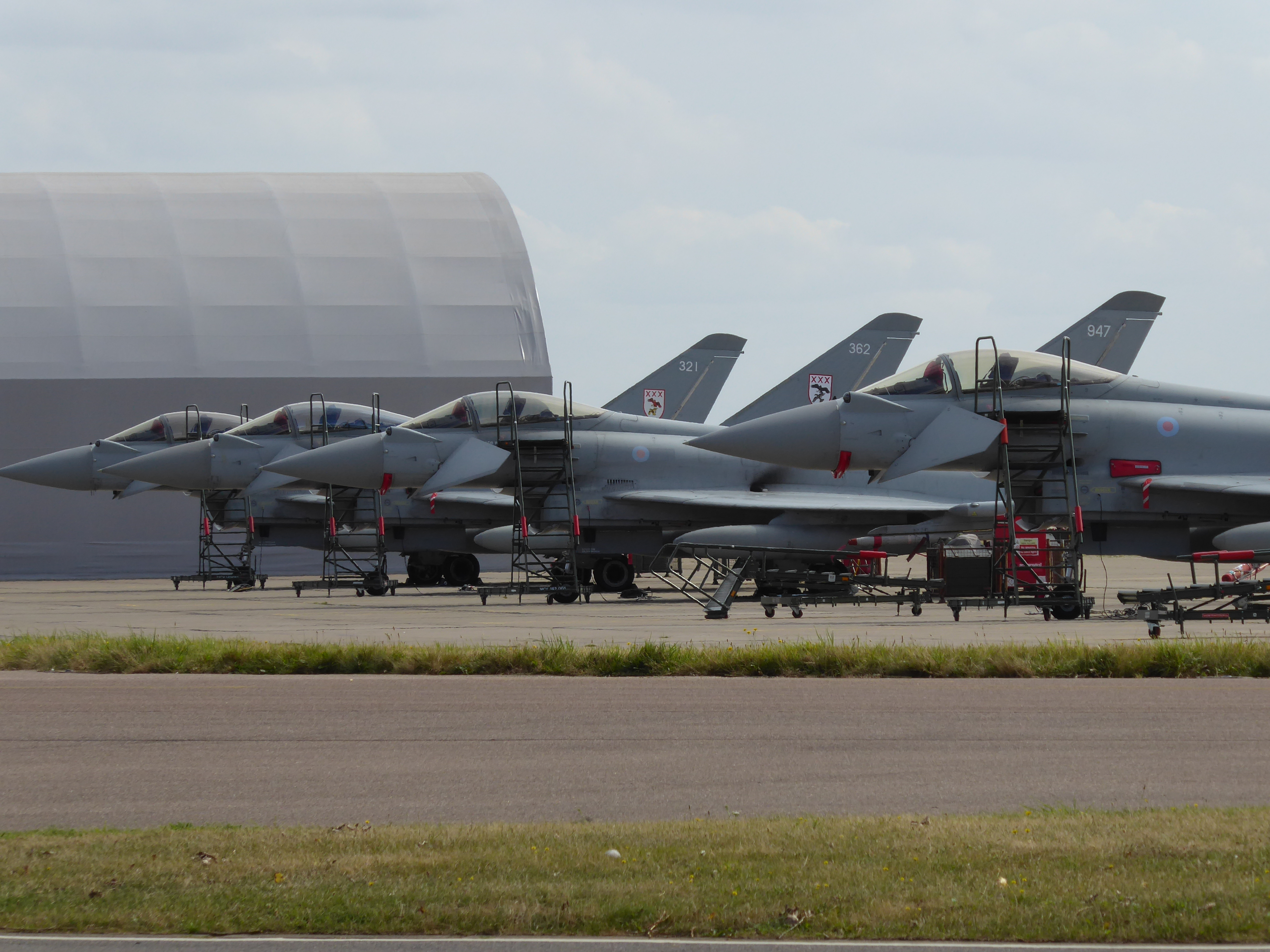
Eurofighter Typhoons on the flightline at Coningsby

No. 12 Squadron reactivated in July 2018 and is temporarily integrating Qatar Emiri Air Force air and ground crews in order to provide training and support as part of the Qatari purchase of twenty-four Typhoons from the UK. In October 2019, RAF Coningsby signed a twinning agreement with Fighter Wing 73 (Jagdgeschwader 73) of the German Air Force (Luftwaffe) to enhance opportunities to meet and train with one another. The wing, based at Laage in north-eastern Germany, also operates the Eurofighter Typhoon.

=== Atlantic Eagles ===
As part of the Atlantic Eagles mission conducted by the Japan Air Self-Defense Force, RAF Coningsby was selected as the location of the JASDF's first fighter aircraft deployment to Europe in its 71-year history, with air bases in North America and Germany also selected as part of the mission. On 18 September 2025, two Mitsubishi F-15J fighter jets, supported by Boeing KC-767 & KC-46A aerial refueling aircraft and Kawasaki C-2 transport planes arrived at Coningsby, marking the start of the deployment.

== Role and operations ==
RAF Coningsby's mission statement is 'To develop the future, deliver the present and commemorate the past of the Royal Air Force's combat air power.' The station is home to nearly 3,000 military personnel, civil servants, and contractors. BAE Systems Military Air Solutions, who produce the Typhoon, are also stationed on the airfield with the contract to maintain the aircraft.

=== Command ===
The station commander is Group Captain Billy Cooper. William, Prince of Wales served as the station's Honorary Air Commandant from 2008 till 2023. His wife, Catherine, took over the role in August 2023. The station is under the command of No. 1 Group (Air Combat).

=== Typhoon operations ===
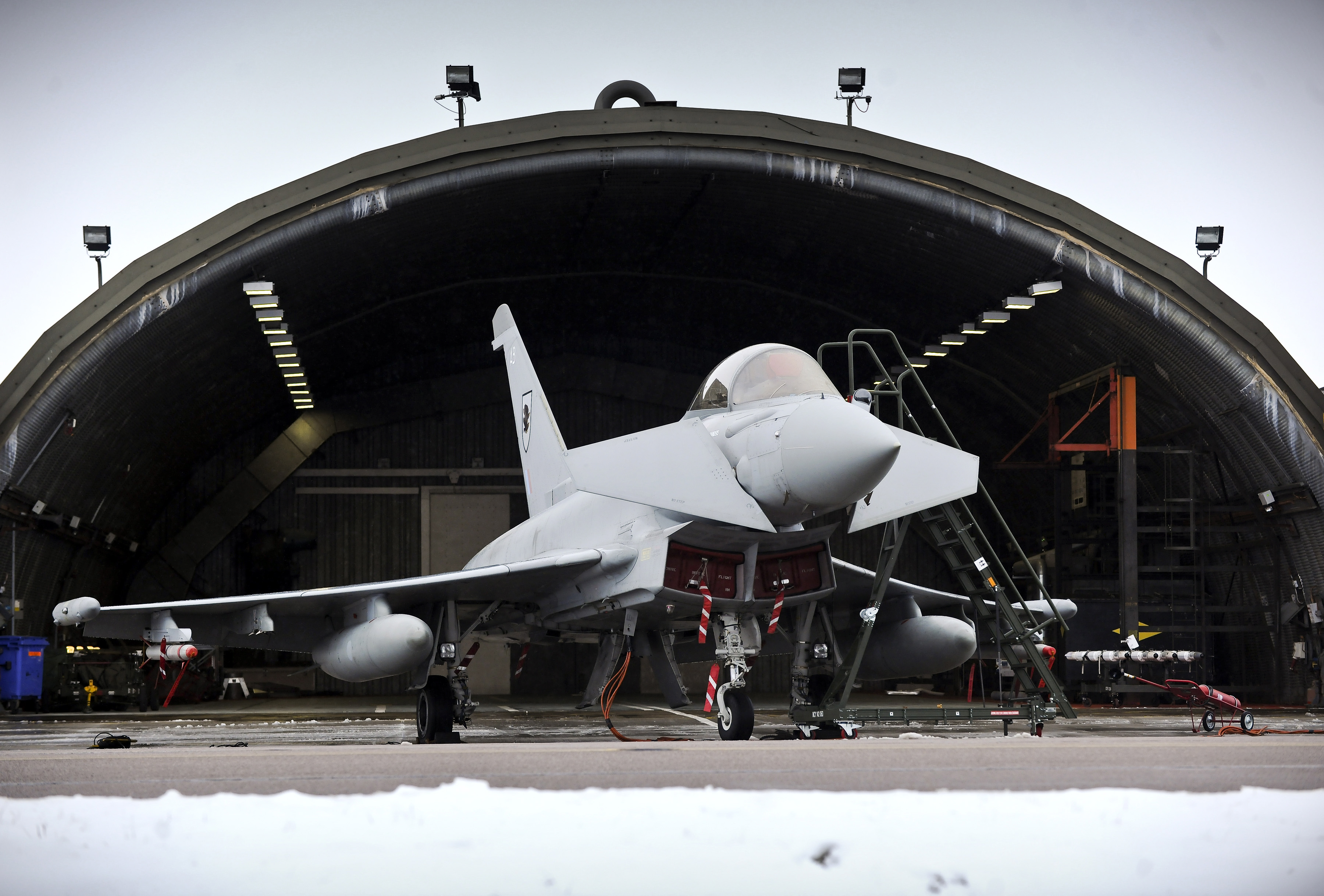
A No. 11 Squadron Eurofighter Typhoon outside a hardened aircraft shelter at Coningsby.

The Eurofighter Typhoon FGR4 provides the RAF with a multi-role combat capability for air policing, peace support and high intensity conflict. RAF Coningsby is the home to three front-line Typhoon units, No. 3(F) Squadron and No. 11 Squadron as well as No. 12 Squadron which is a joint RAF/Qatar Emiri Air Force squadron. They are accompanied by No. 29 Squadron which is the Typhoon Operational Conversion Unit which trains new crews.

==== Quick Reaction Alert ====
Since June 2007, Coningsby's Typhoons have been responsible for maintaining the Quick Reaction Alert (Interceptor) South mission (QRA(I)S). Aircraft and crews are held at a high state of readiness, 24 hours a day, 365 days a year, to respond to unidentified aircraft approaching UK airspace. QRA missions range from civilian airliners which have stopped responding to air traffic control, to intercepting Russian aircraft such as the Tupolev Tu-95 Bear and Tu-160 Blackjack.

==== Test and Evaluation ====
The fourth Typhoon unit is No. 41 (Test and Evaluation) Squadron which is part of the Air Warfare Centre. The squadron develops operational tactics and evaluates new avionics and weapons systems. Formerly the Fast Jet and Weapons Operational Evaluation Unit (FJWOEU), which was formed by merging the Strike Attack OEU (previously based at MOD Boscombe Down) and the Tornado F3 OEU (now returned to its home base of RAF Coningsby after a temporary 'lay-over' at RAF Waddington) and the Air-Guided Weapons OEU (previously based at RAF Valley).

=== Battle of Britain Memorial Flight ===
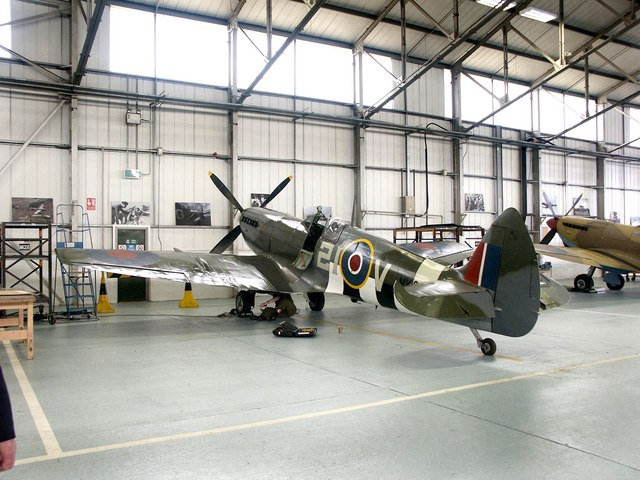
Spitfire Mk IX MK356 inside the Battle of Britain Memorial Flight hangar.

Coningsby has been home of the Battle of Britain Memorial Flight (BBMF) and the associated visitor centre since March 1976 when it arrived from RAF Coltishall. The BBMF operate one of two remaining airworthy Avro Lancaster bombers in the world, alongside; six Spitfires of various types; two Hurricanes; a Dakota and two Chipmunks, the latter type being used for pilot training.

=== Force Protection ===
No. 7 Force Protection Wing Headquarters provides operational planning, command and control to two RAF Regiment field squadrons attached to the wing, No. 63 (Queen's Colour) Squadron (based at RAF Northolt) and No. 2623 (East Anglian) Squadron (RAuxAF) (based at RAF Honington) whose purpose is to protect RAF bases at home and abroad from ground attack. Part of No. 4 RAF Police Squadron, under the command of No. 2 RAF Police & Security Wing at RAF Waddington, is also based at the station and provides policing, security and guarding.

==== Air Land Integration (ALI) Cell ====
No. 7 Force Protection Wing includes the Air Land Integration (ALI) Cell, which provides a forward air control capability. The ALI Cell trains and provides joint terminal attack controllers (JTACs) and tactical air controller parties (TACPs) to support RAF and joint operations. The ALI Cell moved to Coningsby from RAF Honington in Suffolk and came under the control of the wing in June 2018.

=== Expeditionary Air Wing ===
No. 121 Expeditionary Air Wing was formed at Coningsby on 1 April 2006 to create a deployable air force structure.

== Based units ==
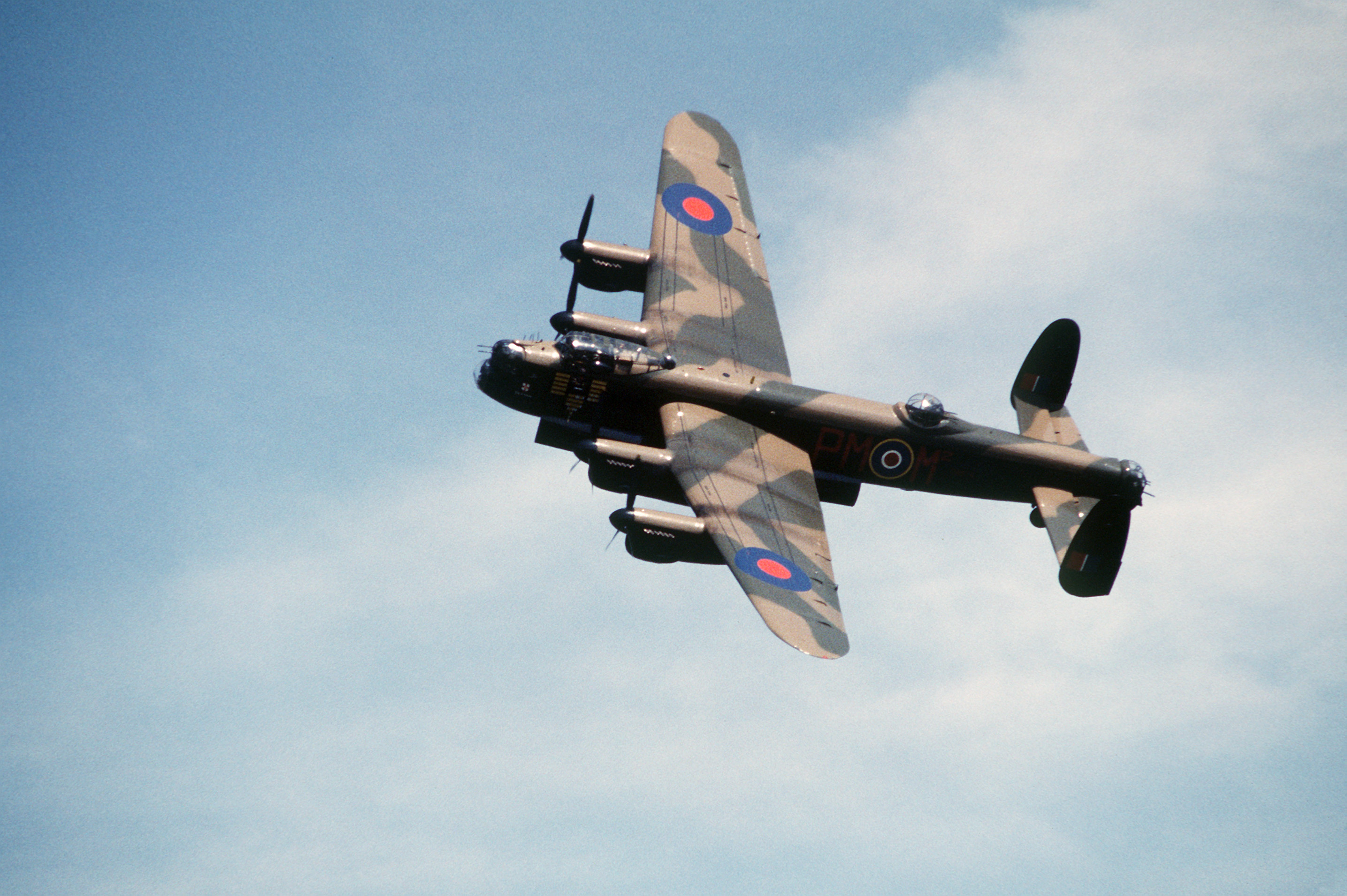
Lancaster PA474 seen in 1988

Flying and major non-flying units based at RAF Coningsby.

=== Royal Air Force ===
No. 1 Group (Air Combat)

- Combat Air Force
  - Headquarters, Combat Air Force
  - No. 3 (Fighter) Squadron – Typhoon FGR4
  - No. 11 (F) Squadron – Typhoon FGR4
  - No. 12 Squadron – Typhoon FGR4
  - No. 29 Squadron – Typhoon FGR4
    - Typhoon Display Team
- Air and Space Warfare Centre
  - No. 41 Test and Evaluation Squadron – Typhoon FGR4
- Battle of Britain Memorial Flight (BBMF) – Spitfire, Hurricane, Lancaster, Dakota and Chipmunk

No. 2 Group (Air Combat Support)

- Air Security Force
  - No. 2 RAF Police & Security Wing
    - No. 4 RAF Police (Typhoon) Squadron
- Combat Readiness Force
  - No. 7 Force Protection Wing
    - Headquarters No. 7 Force Protection Wing
    - Air Land Integration (ALI) Cell

=== British Army ===
Royal Engineers

- 8 Engineer Brigade
  - 20 Works Group (Air Support)
    - 532 Specialist Team Royal Engineers (Airfields) (STRE)

== Heritage ==
=== Station badge and motto ===
RAF Coningsby's badge, awarded in December 1958, features a depiction of Tattershall Castle. The local landmark, dating from the 15th century, is about 1 kilometre (0.62 mi) north-west of the station.

The station's motto is Loyalty binds me.

=== Gate guardians ===
Two preserved aircraft are located at the main gate of RAF Coningsby and act as gate guardians for the station. The first is McDonnell Douglas F-4M Phantom FGR.2 'XT891' wearing No. 41 Squadron markings and the second Panavia Tornado F3 'ZE760' in No .5 Squadron markings.

Within the No. 3 Squadron hardened aircraft shelter (HAS) complex, Hawker Siddeley Harrier GR.3 'XW924' is on display and within the No.11 Squadron HAS complex is English Electric Lightning F.6 'XT753'. A further Lightning F.6, 'XS897' (wearing 'XP765') is preserved in the No. 29 Squadron site.

== Incidents and accidents ==
1974 Norfolk mid-air collision: On 9 August 1974, the station commander 42-year-old Group Captain David Blucke, and his navigator Flight Lieutenant Terence Kirkland (aged 28 and from Derry), were killed whilst piloting the Phantom XV493 of 41 Squadron. Flying at low level, it hit a Piper Pawnee crop-spraying plane (from Southend-on-Sea) over Fordham, Norfolk, near Downham Market. Blucke was son of Air Vice-Marshal Robert Blucke who was known for the 1935 Daventry Experiment.

2024 Spitfire crash: On 25 May 2024, Supermarine Spitfire LF Mk.IXe MK356 of the Battle of Britain Memorial Flight crashed shortly after takeoff in a field off Langrick Road, to the east of the station. The sole pilot, Squadron Leader Mark Long, was killed in the accident. He had been a pilot with the team for four years, and was set to become Officer Commanding BBMF in October 2024. Along with a BBMF Hawker Hurricane, the aircraft was due to display at the Lincolnshire Aviation Heritage Centre in East Kirkby, Lincolnshire as a part of the centre's "Lanc, Tank and Military Machines" event.

== List of station commanders ==
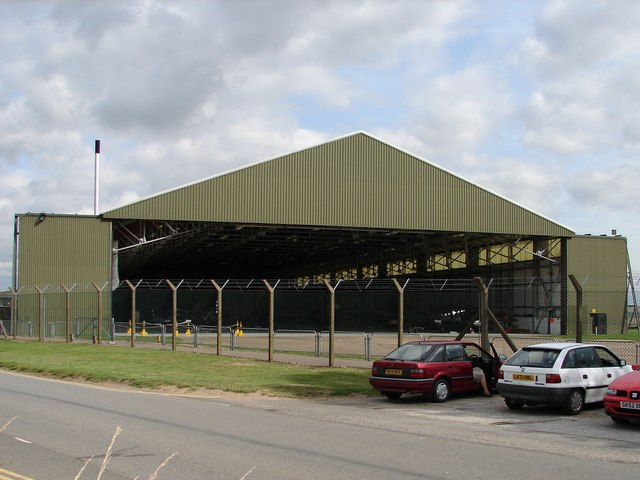
BBMF Hangar

- Air Chief Marshal Sir Augustus Walker GCB 1951–1954
- Air Commodore David Strong CB 1957–59
- Air Vice-Marshal Michael Le Bas CB CBE DSO AFC 1959–1961
- Air Vice-Marshal Frank Dodd CBE DFC 1961–1963
- Air Chief Marshal Sir John Rogers KCB CBE 1967–1969
- Group Captain David Robert Kidgell Blucke ?-1974
- Air Vice-Marshal Dennis Allison CB 1974–1976
- Air Vice-Marshal Derek Bryant CB OBE 1976–1978
- Group Captain Christopher Sprent 1978–80
- Air Chief Marshal Sir William Wratten CBE CB 1980–1982
- Air Commodore Robert (Bob) Arnott CBE 1982–1984
- Group Captain Mike Elsam 1984–1986
- Air Marshal Sir Christopher Coville CB 1986–1988
- Air Commodore Martin Widdowson 1988–1990
- Air Marshal Clifford Spink CB CBE 1990–1993
- Air Vice-Marshal Peter Ruddock CBE 1999–2000

The following Station Commanders are listed in the rank held at the time of appointment:

- Group Captain Bob Judson (2004–2006)
- Group Captain Stuart Atha DSO (2006–2008)
- Group Captain J J Hitchcock (2008–2010)
- Group Captain Martin Sampson DSO (2010–2012)
- Group Captain Johnny Stringer (2012–2014)
- Group Captain Jez Attridge OBE (2014–2016)
- Group Captain Mike Baulkwill (2016–2018)
- Group Captain Mark Flewin (2018–2020)
- Group Captain Matt Peterson (2020–2022)
- Group Captain Billy Cooper (2022–2024)
- Group Captain Paul O'Grady (2024–2025)
- Group Captain Andrew Hampshire (2025–present)

== See also ==
- List of Royal Air Force stations
