= Martin Sampson =

Senior Royal Air Force Officer

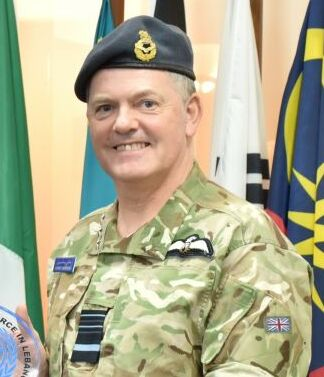
- Sampson in 2023
- Military career
- Allegiance: United Kingdom
- Branch: Royal Air Force
- Service years: 1986 - 2024
- Rank: Air Marshal
- Nickname: Sammy
- Commands: No. 83 Expeditionary Air Group; RAF Coningsby; No. 1 (F) Squadron RAF
- Conflicts: Iraq War; Operation Shader; War in Afghanistan
- Awards: Companion of the Order of the Bath; Commander of the Order of the British Empire; Distinguished Service Order

Air Marshal Martin Elliot Sampson, CB, CBE, DSO is a retired senior Royal Air Force officer, last serving as UK Defence Senior Advisor to the Middle East and North Africa.

== RAF career ==
Sampson was commissioned into the Royal Air Force on 23 October 1986 as an acting pilot officer. He was regraded as a pilot officer on 23 October 1987. After passing pilot training he flew the SEPECAT Jaguar for 3 years until moving over to the Harrier jump jet following the Gulf War. He was a Qualified Weapons Instructor on the Harrier and flew over 500 missions in Iraq, Afghanistan, Bosnia, Iraq, and Kosovo. He served 3 years with the United States Marine Corps on an exchange tour flying the McDonnell Douglas AV-8B Harrier II and the F-5.

He became air officer commanding No. 1 Squadron in 2004, during that period the Harrier GR9 was brought into frontline service, with numerous carrier deployments and multiple tours in Afghanistan to support Operation Herrick. In December 2008, he was promoted to group captain and became Assistant Head Joint Strike and ISTAR. In 2010, Sampson became station commander at RAF Coningsby as the RAF Typhoon Force Commander. During that time he was deployed to Gioia Del Colle, Italy as a part of Operation Unified Protector and served as Expeditionary Air Wing Commander for the RAF fast jet operations over Libyan airspace. Additionally, Sampson flew 2 seasons with the Battle of Britain Memorial Flight flying Spitfires and Hurricanes.

In November 2012, he was promoted to air commodore and appointed Joint Force Air Component Commander. In 2014 he assumed command of the No. 83 Expeditionary Air Group and the position of UK Air Component Commander. He commanded all RAF operations over Iraq and Syria during Operation Shader.

In February 2021, he was promoted to air marshal and appointed serving as UK Defence Senior Advisor to the Middle East and North Africa. He retired from the Royal Air Force on 30 July 2024.

== Honours and decorations ==
In 2006, he was awarded the Distinguished Service Order (DSO) in recognition of his command of the Harrier Squadron during two tours in Afghanistan. On 21 April 2017, Sampson was appointed a Commander of the Order of the British Empire (CBE) "in recognition of gallant and distinguished services in the field during the period 1 April to 30 September 2016". In the 2024 King's Birthday Honours, he was appointed Companion of the Order of the Bath (CB).

Military offices
Unknown	Officer Commanding No. 1 (Fighter) Squadron; 2004–2006	Succeeded by K A Lewis
Preceded by J Hitchcock	Station Commander RAF Coningsby; 2010–2012	Succeeded by Johnny Stringer
Preceded by Alan Gillespie	Air Officer Commanding No. 83 Expeditionary Air Group; 2014–2016	Succeeded by Johnny Stringer
