= Johnny Stringer (RAF officer) =

Royal Air Force officer

Air Chief Marshal Sir Johnny Stringer KCB CBE
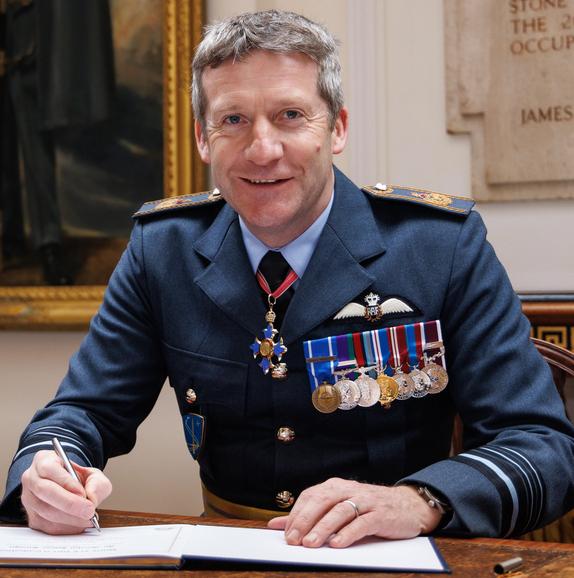
- Stringer in 2024
- Born: November 1969 (age 56); Sale, Greater Manchester, England
- Alma mater: New College, Oxford; King's College London
- Military career
- Allegiance: United Kingdom
- Branch: Royal Air Force
- Service years: 1993–present
- Rank: Air Chief Marshal
- Service number: 5206233K
- Commands: Deputy Supreme Allied Commander Europe (2026–); No. 83 Expeditionary Air Group (2016–17); RAF Coningsby (2012–14); No. 29 Squadron RAF (2007–09)
- Conflicts: Iraq War; Operation Shader; War in Afghanistan
- Awards: Knight Commander of the Order of the Bath; Commander of the Order of the British Empire

Air Chief Marshal Sir John Jackson "Johnny" Stringer, KCB, CBE (born November 1969) is a senior Royal Air Force officer, who has served as Deputy Supreme Allied Commander Europe since March 2026. Previously, he served as Deputy Commander of the Allied Air Command from August 2022 to March 2026.

== Early life and education ==
Stringer was born in Sale, Cheshire, England, in November 1969. He was educated at Watford Grammar School for Boys, then a partially-selective school in Watford, Hertfordshire. He studied at New College, Oxford. He is a graduate of the UK Advanced and Higher Command and Staff Courses, the Royal College of Defence Studies and holds master's degrees from the University of Oxford and King's College London.

== RAF career ==
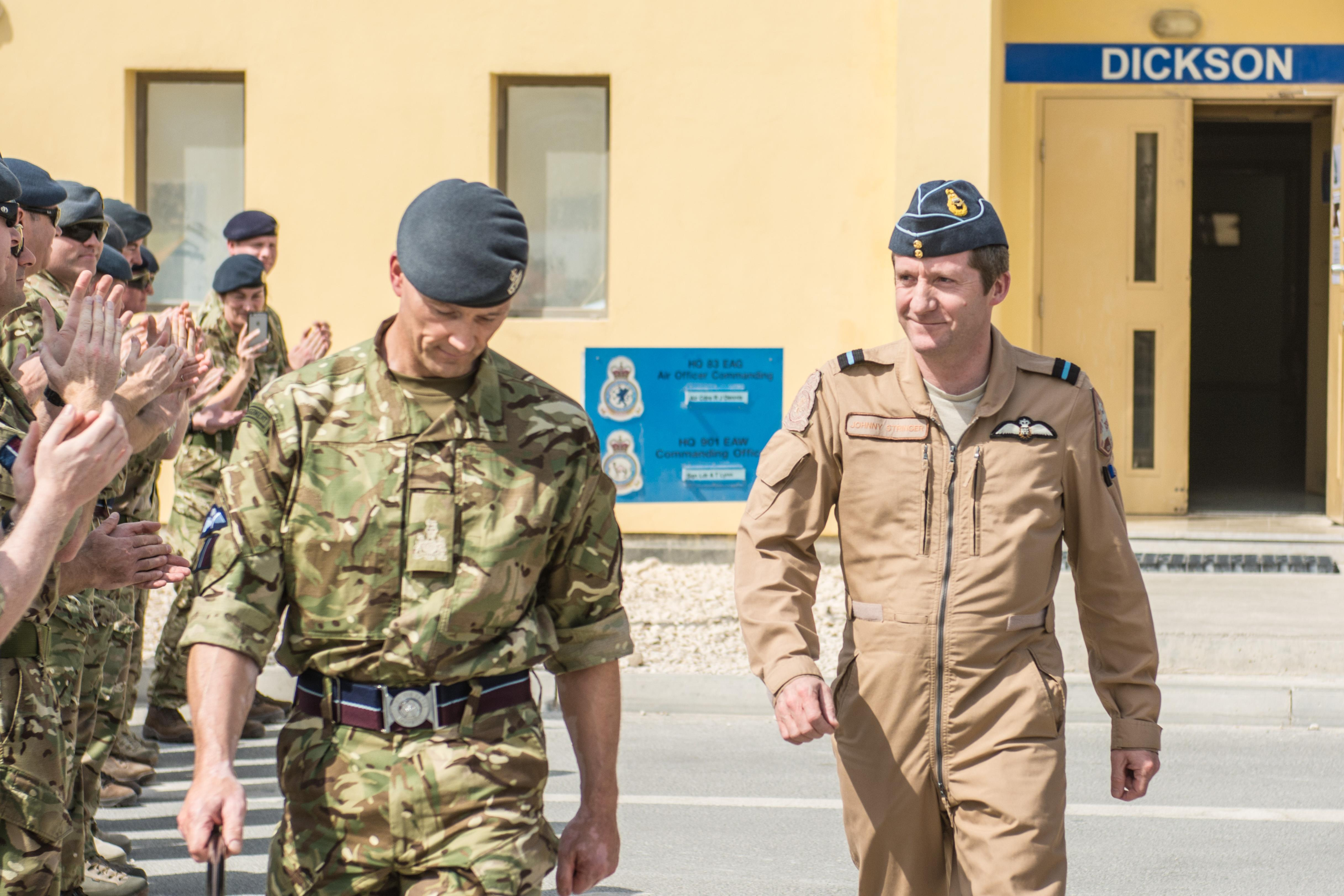
Stringer while commander of 83 Expeditionary Air Group, 2017

Stringer was commissioned into the Royal Air Force in 1993. After officer and pilot training, he joined the SEPECAT Jaguar Force at RAF Coltishall. A Qualified Weapon Instructor, he flew operationally over Yugoslavia and helped enforce the Northern Iraq No Fly Zone.

From 2007 to 2009, Stringer served as the air officer commanding No. 29 Squadron RAF, the Typhoon Operational Conversion Unit at RAF Coningsby. He spent two years as Deputy Assistant Chief of Staff (DACOS) Joint Effects in the J3 Division of the Permanent Joint Headquarters in Northwood.

Between October 2012 and September 2014, he commanded RAF Coningsby and its Typhoon Wing. He was posted as Assistant Chief of Staff Operations (ACOS Ops) to Headquarters Air Command in August 2015. He went on to command No. 83 Expeditionary Air Group as the UK Air Component Commander between October 2016 and October 2017, and oversaw all air operations in Operation Shader.

On 11 May 2018, in the 2018 Special Honours, Stringer was appointed Commander of the Order of the British Empire "in recognition of gallant and distinguished services in the field during the period 1 April 2017 to 30 September 2017".

Promoted to air vice-marshal, he served as Chief of Staff at Joint Forces Command (JFC) and subsequently Director of Strategy as JFC evolved into UK Strategic Command, overseeing its work on the 2021 UK Defence and Security Integrated Review. He was promoted to air marshal in August 2022 and appointed Deputy Commander of Allied Air Command. Stringer has over 3,000 flying hours, predominantly on single-seat combat aircraft. He was appointed a Knight Commander of the Order of the Bath in the 2025 Birthday Honours.

In January 2026, it was announced that Stringer would be promoted to air chief marshal and appointed Deputy Supreme Allied Commander Europe in March 2026. He subsequently took up the position on 5 March 2026.

== Personal life ==
Stringer is married to Lisa and has two sons. His interests include history, art and literature, food and drink, and road cycling. He is the President of the Royal Air Force Gliding & Soaring Association.

Military offices
Preceded by Martin Sampson	Station Commander RAF Coningsby; 2012–2014	Succeeded by Jez Attridge
Preceded by Martin Sampson	Air Officer Commanding No. 83 Expeditionary Air Group; 2016–2017	Succeeded by R J Dennis
Preceded by Sir Keith Blount	Deputy Supreme Allied Commander Europe; 2026–present	Incumbent
