= No. 17 Squadron RAF =

Flying squadron of the Royal Air Force

No. XVII Squadron RAF
- Squadron badge
- Active: 1915–1918 (RFC); 1918–1919; 1924–1948; 1949–1951; 1956–1969; 1970–1999; 2002–2013; 2013–present
- Country: United Kingdom
- Branch: Royal Air Force
- Type: Flying squadron
- Role: Test and evaluation
- Part of: No. 1 Group; Combat Air
- Station: Edwards AFB, California
- Mottos: Excellere Contende (Latin for 'Strive to excel')
- Aircraft: Lockheed Martin F-35B Lightning

Insignia
- Roundel
- Tail codes: UV (Nov 1938 – Sep 1939); YB Sep (1939 – Feb 1948); UT (Feb 1949 – Mar 1951); B (Jaguars); CA–CZ (Aug 1985 – Mar 1999)

Number 17 Squadron, also known as No. XVII Squadron and currently No. 17 Test and Evaluation Squadron, is a squadron of the Royal Air Force. It is based at Edwards Air Force Base in the United States and is the operational evaluation unit for the Lockheed Martin F-35B Lightning.

The squadron formed at Gosport in 1915 as part of the Royal Flying Corps flying the Royal Aircraft Factory B.E.2c. During the First World War it conducted reconnaissance operations in Egypt, Sinai, and Macedonia, later splitting operations between Batum and Constantinople with the Airco D.H.9 and Sopwith Camel, before disbanding in 1919. Reformed in 1924 as a fighter squadron, it flew various aircraft in the Battle of Britain. In 1942, it deployed to Burma, conducting ground attacks and later operated the Supermarine Spitfire in Burma and Japan until 1948. During the Cold War it carried out several roles including photographic reconnaissance flying the Electric Canberra PR.7 from Germany (1956–1969) and ground-attack flying the McDonnell Douglas Phantom FGR.2 and SEPECAT Jaguar GR1 (1970–1985). It later took part in the 1991 Gulf War flying the Panavia Tornado GR1. Disbanded in 1999, it reformed in 2002 as the Eurofighter Typhoon operational evaluation unit, before converting to the F-35B Lightning in 2013.

== History ==
=== First World War (1915–1918) ===
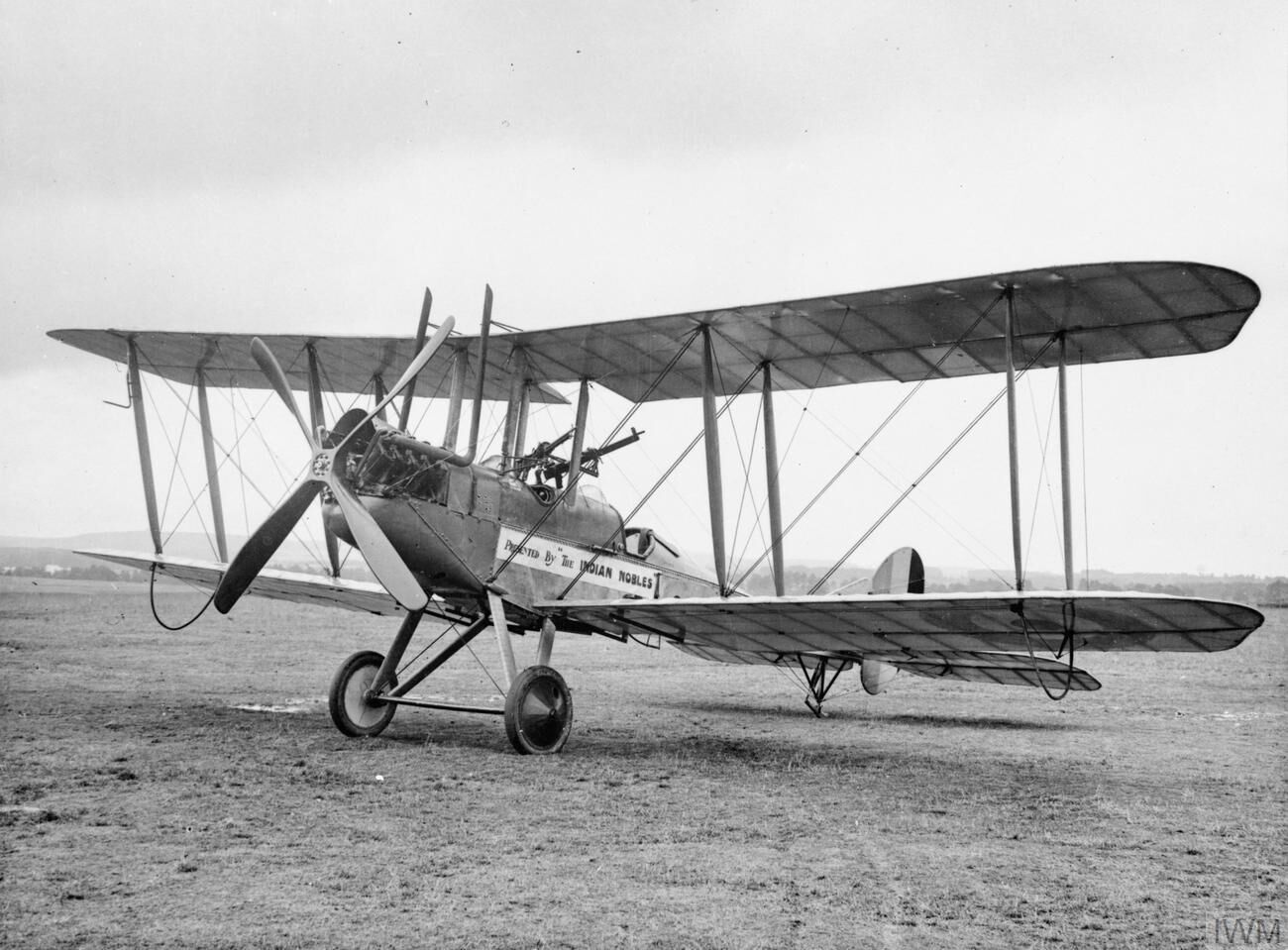
A Royal Aircraft Factory B.E.2c, the type No. 17 Squadron operated between 1915 and 1918

No. 17 Squadron formed for the first time on 1 February 1915 at Fort Grange, Gosport as part of the Royal Flying Corps. It was first equipped with the Royal Aircraft Factory B.E.2c. After an initial training period, the squadron embarked for Egypt in November and arrived on 11 December. On 24 December, the squadron made its first reconnaissance flight over the Turkish lines in Sinai, also flying in support of troops engaged with Turkish army units in the Western Desert. Detachments were also to be found in Arabia until July 1916, when the squadron was sent to Salonika as a mixed unit of twelve B.E.2c for reconnaissance and a scout component of two Airco D.H.2 and three Bristol Scouts. At first it was the only flying corps unit in Macedonia, but was later joined by others in April 1918, handing over its fighters to a newly formed No. 150 Squadron. For the rest of the war, it was engaged in tactical reconnaissance and artillery spotting on the Bulgarian border.

=== Interwar years (1918–1939) ===
In December 1918, No. 17 Squadron re-equipped with twelve Airco D.H.9 and six Sopwith Camels, sending 'A Flight' to Batum to support the White Russian forces and 'B' and 'C Flights' to Constantinople in January 1919. On 14 November 1919, the squadron disbanded.

The squadron reformed at RAF Hawkinge in Kent on 1 April 1924 and was equipped with the Sopwith Snipe. From this point until the outbreak of the Second World War, it formed part of the fighter defence of the UK. The squadron converted to the Hawker Woodcock in March 1926, one of only two squadrons to operate it – the other being No. 3 Squadron. In June 1927, a Woodcock from No. 17 Squadron was borrowed by Charles Lindbergh, the pilot of the Spirit of St. Louis, who flew it from London to Paris shortly after his transatlantic flight. In January 1928, the squadron converted to the Gloster Gamecock, however these were only kept until September when they were exchanged for the Armstrong Whitworth Siskin.

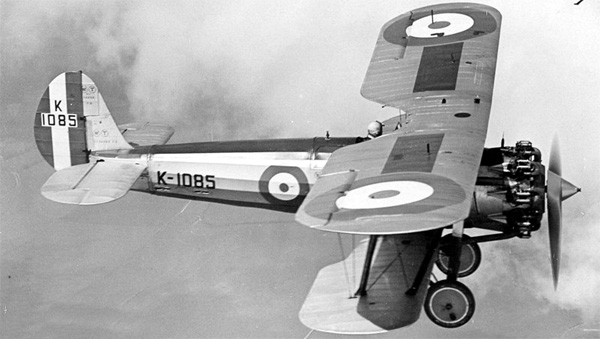
A Bristol Bulldog, similar to the type No. 17 Squadron operated between 1929 and 1936

No. 17 Squadron re-equipped with the Bristol Bulldog Mk.II in October 1929, which were kept until August 1936. However, during the Abyssinian Crisis in 1935, the squadron lost most of its Bulldogs as reinforcements for other squadrons moving to the Middle East, so had to fly the Hawker Hart for a period. The squadron were equipped with the Gloster Gauntlet in August 1936.

=== Second World War (1939–1945) ===
In June 1939, No. 17 Squadron received its first monoplane, the Hawker Hurricane Mk.I. Until the German attack on France in May 1940, it flew defensive patrols from numerous bases in Britain, including RAF Debden in Essex and RAF Martlesham Heath in Suffolk, Once the Phony War was over, fighter sweeps were then flown over the Netherlands, Belgium and French airfields to cover the retreat of allied troops. In June 1940, the squadron moved to Brittany as the remnants of the British Expeditionary Force and RAF units in France were evacuated, retiring to the Channel Islands for two days before returning to the UK. The squadron flew over southern England throughout the Battle of Britain. It briefly upgraded to the Hawker Hurricane Mk.IIa in February 1941, however they shortly reverted to the Hurricane Mk.I in April. The squadron moved to RAF Castletown in Caithness on 5 April for rest. In July 1941 the Squadron again upgraded its Hurricanes, this time to the Mk.IIb.

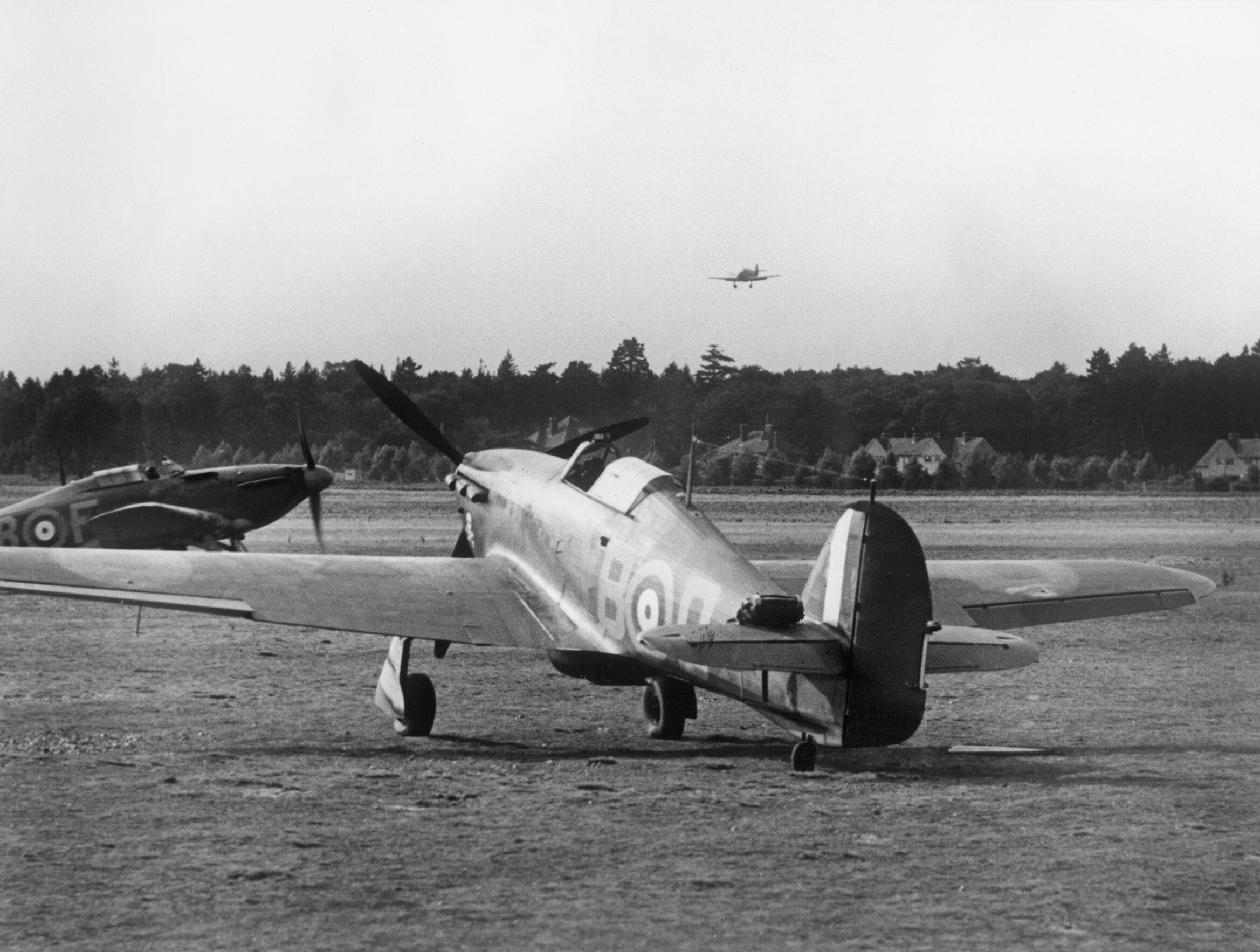
Hawker Hurricanes of No. 17 Squadron at RAF Debden, Essex, in July 1940

On 11 November 1941, No. 17 Squadron sailed for the Far East where war broke out on 7 December. Diverted to Burma, it arrived in January 1942, as Japanese troops neared Rangoon. Defensive patrols were flown until the Rangoon airfields were overrun and the squadron moved north, eventually being cut off from India while operating from Lashio. The surviving aircraft were flown out and the ground personnel made their way across Burma to the Indian border. By the end of May, the squadron had re-assembled at Calcutta and in June received aircraft again for the defence of the area. In August 1942, it upgraded to the Hurricane Mk.IIc. Ground attack missions began in February 1943 and continued until August, when the squadron moved to Ceylon. The Supermarine Spitfire Mk. VIII began to arrive in March 1944 and were taken back to the Burma front in November to fly escort and ground attack missions. In June 1945, the squadron upgraded to the Spitfire Mk.XIVe. The squadron was withdrawn from Burma to prepare for the invasion of Malaya. However, due to the atomic bombings of Hiroshima and Nagasaki, they were taken by the Royal Navy aircraft carrier HMS Trumpeter to the landing beaches near Penang in early September, soon after the Japanese capitulation.

=== Cold War (1946–1989) ===
In April 1946, No. 17 Squadron arrived in Japan to form part of the British Commonwealth Occupation Force. The squadron remained there until it disbanded on 23 February 1948. However it shortly reformed on 11 February 1949 at RAF Chivenor in Devon when No. 691 Squadron was renumbered as No. 17 Squadron. The squadron adopted No. 691 Squadron's role of being an anti-aircraft co-operation unit. During this time the Squadron flew a mixture of aircraft including the Spitfire LF.XVIe and target tugs: Airspeed Oxford T.II; Miles Martinet TT.I; North American Harvard TT.IIb; and Bristol Beaufighter TT.X. The squadron continued this role until it disbanded once again on 13 March 1951.

No. 17 Squadron reformed at RAF Wahn in West Germany on 1 June 1956, operating the English Electric Canberra PR.7 in the photo reconnaissance role. The squadron moved to RAF Wildenrath in April 1957 before standing down on 31 December 1969. It stood up once more on 1 September 1970 at RAF Brüggen, this time flying the McDonnell Douglas Phantom FGR.2 in the ground attack role. It was also assigned to NATO's Supreme Allied Commander Europe (SACEUR) in which the Phantoms held a tactical nuclear strike role, carrying American supplied nuclear weapons.

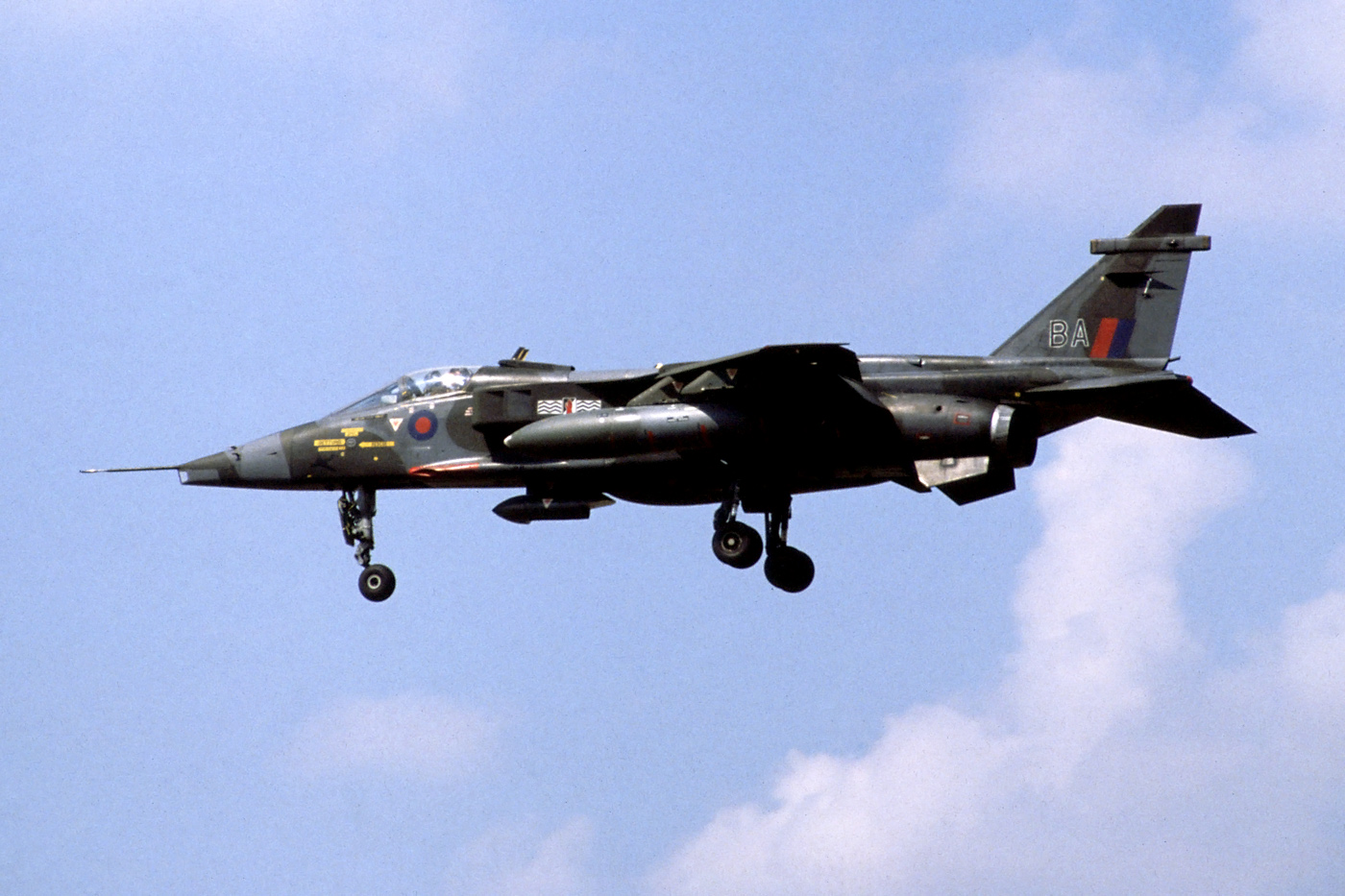
A SEPECAT Jaguar GR1 in No. 17 Squadron markings at RAF Brüggen in 1982

In September 1975, No. 17 Squadron began to convert to the SEPECAT Jaguar GR1. It was fully re-equipped with twelve Jaguar GR1 by 31 January 1976. It continued the nuclear strike role until 1984, being assigned to SACEUR, but this time carrying the British WE.177 nuclear weapon. The squadron's task was to support land forces in a high-intensity European war using conventional weapons initially, and tactical nuclear weapons if a conflict escalated. Some aircraft were to be held back in reserve from the conventional phase to ensure that sufficient aircraft survived the conventional phase to deliver the squadron's full stock of eight nuclear weapons.

Still at RAF Brüggen, No. 17 Squadron began to convert to the Panavia Tornado GR1 in January 1985. It reached full strength of twelve aircraft by 1 March when the squadron's last Jaguars were withdrawn. The squadron at this time also had eighteen WE.177 nuclear bombs, and although the squadron's role remained unchanged, it's Tornado aircraft were each able to carry two bombs, with the ratio of weapons to aircraft at full strength increasing to 1.5 : 1.

==== Desert Storm onwards (1990s) ====
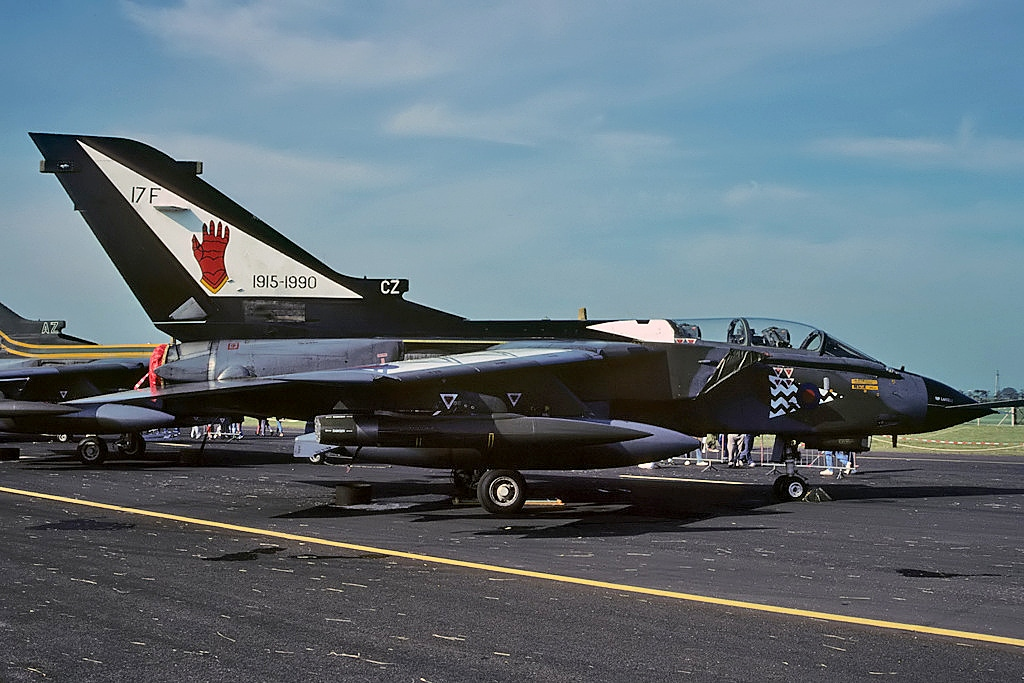
A Panavia Tornado GR1 in markings celebrating the 90th anniversary of No. 17 Squadron in 1990

During the First Gulf War in 1991, No. 17 Squadron engineers were deployed to Muharraq Airfield in Bahrain, and also had crews sent to Dhahran Airfield in Saudi Arabia. At Muharraq, its twelve Tornado GR1 were split between three flight lines nicknamed 'Snoopy AirWays', 'Triffid Airways' and 'Gulf Airways'. Tornado operations, as part of Operation Granby, began on 17 January 1991 to assert air superiority over Iraq. The Squadron suffered a loss on 24 January when a Tornado GR.1 (ZA403) was rocked by an explosion forcing the pilot (Flying Officer. S. J. Burgess) and navigator (Squadron Leader R. Ankerson) to eject. Both crew members were captured and were held as prisoners of war until the end of the conflict. An investigation after the war of the wreckage and flight recorder determined that one of the 1,000lb bombs dropped had detonated prematurely thus causing extensive damage to the Tornado. No. 17 Squadron suffered its second loss on 14 February when a Tornado GR1 (ZD717) carrying out laser-guided bomb attacks on an Iraqi airfield was forced down by two Iraqi surface-to-air-missiles which exploded in close proximity to the aircraft. The pilot (Flight Lieutenant R. J. Clark) initiated ejection for himself and his navigator (Flt. Lt. S. M. Hicks). On landing Clark was captured by Iraqi forces and was held as a prisoners for the rest of the war. It was only after his capture that he learned his navigator Hicks had been killed in the attack.

Returning to RAF Brüggen, No. 17 Squadron continued its nuclear strike role up until the retirement of the WE.177, with it finally relinquishing its nuclear delivery capability fully in 1998. With the end of the Cold War and the reunification of Germany, the RAF planned to reduce its presence in Germany by half, and by 1996 a final decision was made to withdraw the entire RAF presence from the country. Due to the Strategic Defence Review of 1998, it two RAF squadrons were withdrawn, one of which was No. 17 Squadron. The squadron disbanded on 31 March 1999, ending almost 30 years at RAF Brüggen.

=== 21st century (2000– present) ===
==== Typhoon ====
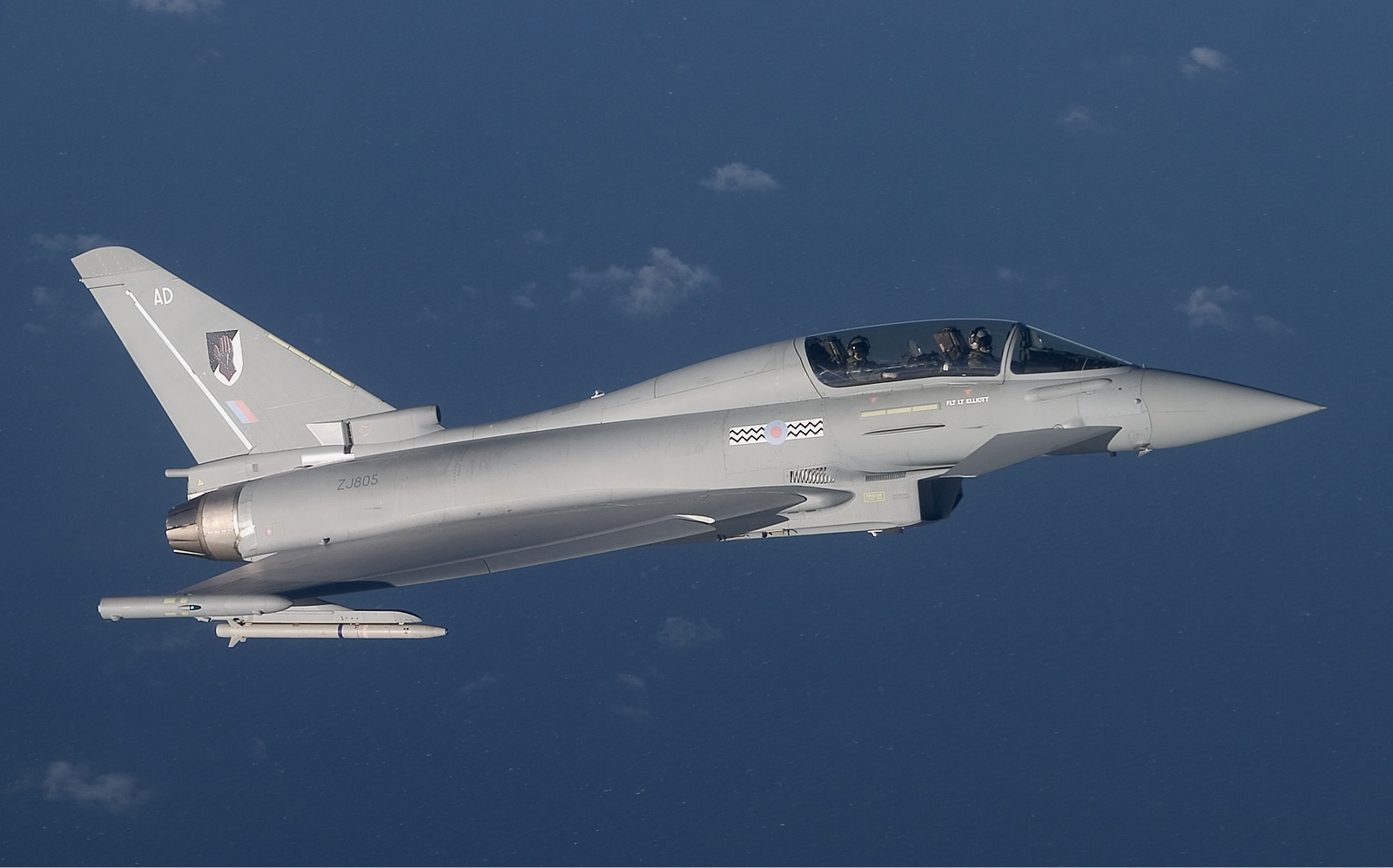
A Eurofighter Typhoon T1 of No. 17 (Reserve) Squadron during 2004

No. 17 Squadron reformed on 1 September 2002 as No. 17 (Reserve) Squadron at the BAE Systems operated Warton Aerodrome in Lancashire At Warton, a special facility had been constructed to specially operate the new Eurofighter Typhoon T1 and F2. No. 17 (R) Squadron was tasked with being the operational evaluation unit (OEU), or alternatively the Typhoon Operational Evaluation Unit (TOEU), for the type, becoming the first in the RAF to operate it.

The squadron relocated to RAF Coningsby in Lincolnshire on 1 April 2005 and was officially re-formed at its new base on 19 May 2005. With the Typhoon fully operational, the need for the separate OEU ended and so the squadron was disbanded on 12 April 2013. Its functions were taken over by the RAF's test and evaluation squadron, No. 41 (R) Squadron.

==== Lightning ====
The squadron stood up at Edwards Air Force Base, California, on 12 April 2013 as a joint RAF and Royal Navy test and evaluation squadron for the new Lockheed Martin F-35B Lightning. In January 2014, it became the first UK, and RAF, squadron to operate the F-35B Lightning, with BK-1 (ZM135) being the first British aircraft. In February 2015, the Squadron celebrated its centenary.

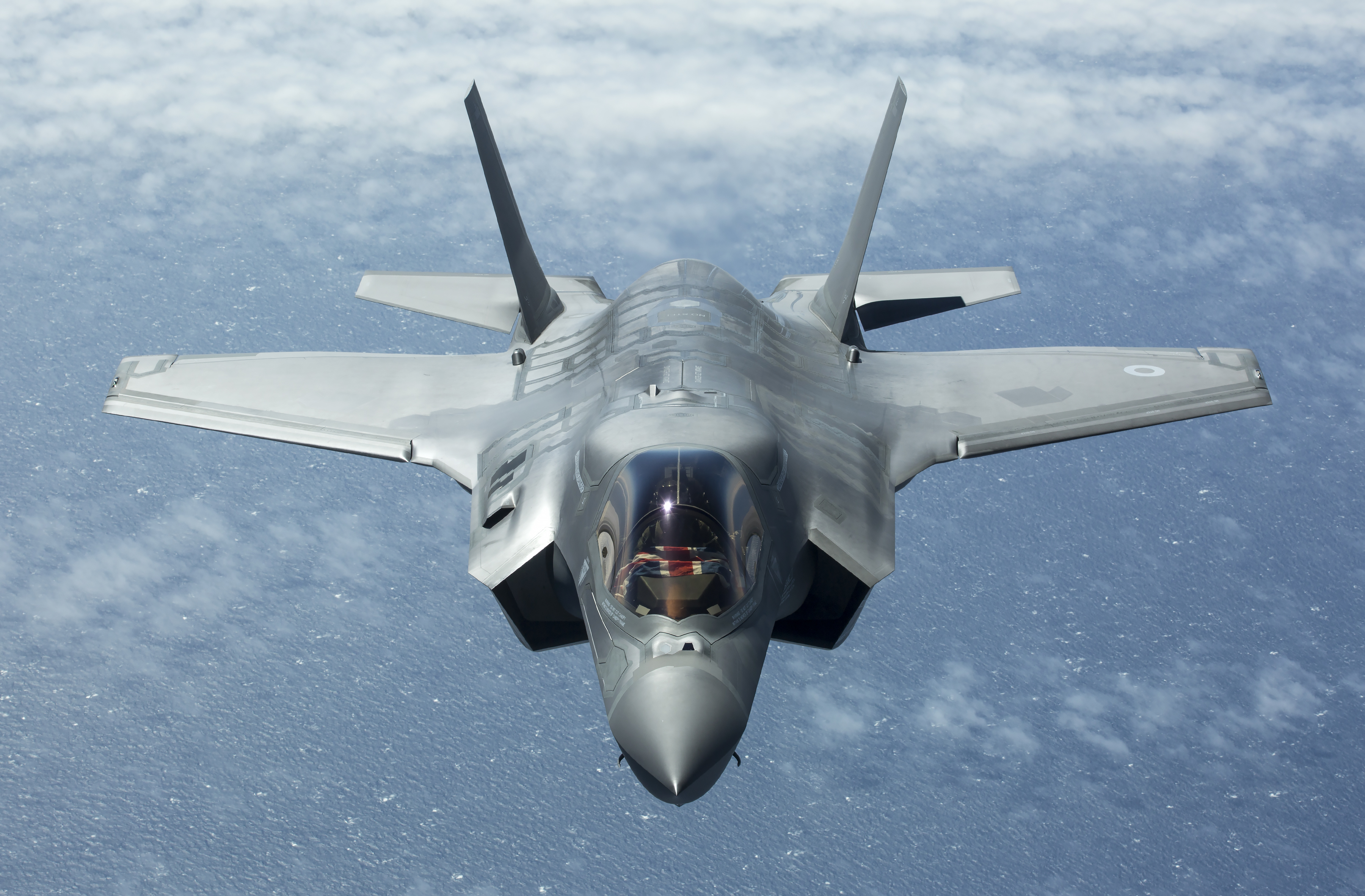
No.17 Squadron was the first RAF squadron to operate the Lockheed Martin F-35B Lightning

No. 17 (Reserve) Test and Evaluation Squadron lost its (reserve) suffix on 1 February 2018 when the (Reserve) nameplate was rescinded across the entire RAF, thus becoming No. 17 Test and Evaluation Squadron.

No. 17 Squadron is made up of half RAF and half Royal Navy personnel, as well as training personnel for No. 617 Squadron and No. 207 Squadron; the second and third RAF squadrons to operate the F-35B in 2018 and 2019. Equipped with three F-35B aircraft and is tasked with the full-time operational test and evaluation of the F-35B, required to bring the aircraft and its weapons into UK service. It is the UK element of the Joint Operational Test Team for the F-35 at Edwards AFB, flying operational test sorties alongside all variants from the US Air Force, US Navy, US Marine Corps and Royal Netherlands Air Force, being embedded with the 461st Flight Test Squadron of the US Air Force.

The squadron embarked their three F-35Bs upon HMS Queen Elizabeth on 13 October 2019 as part of Exercise Westlant 19, becoming the first British jets to land on the carrier.

== Aircraft operated ==
- Royal Aircraft Factory B.E.2c (February 1915 – November 1915)
- Royal Aircraft Factory B.E.2c (December 1915 – June 1918)
- Bristol Scout (July 1916 – September 1916)
- Airco D.H.2 (July 1916 – September 1916)
- Royal Aircraft Factory B.E.12a (November 1916 – September 1918)
- SPAD S.VII (July 1917 – April 1918)
- Nieuport 17 (August 1917 – December 1917)
- Royal Aircraft Factory S.E.5a (December 1917 – April 1918)
- Armstrong Whitworth F.K.8 (March 1918 – December 1918)
- Airco D.H.9 (December 1918 – November 1919)
- Sopwith Camel (December 1918 – November 1919)
- Sopwith Snipe (April 1924 – March 1926)
- Hawker Woodcock (March 1926 – January 1928)
- Gloster Gamecock (January 1928 – September 1928)
- Armstrong Whitworth Siskin Mk.IIIa (September 1928 – October 1929)
- Bristol Bulldog Mk.II (October 1929 – August 1936)
- Bristol Bulldog Mk.IIa (October 1929 – August 1936)
- Hawker Hart (October 1935 – May 1936)
- Gloster Gauntlet Mk.II (August 1936 – June 1939)
- Hawker Hurricane Mk.I (June 1939 – February 1941)
- Hawker Hurricane Mk.IIa (February 1941 – April 1941)
- Hawker Hurricane Mk.I (April 1941 – August 1941)
- Hawker Hurricane Mk.IIb (July 1941 – November 1941)
- Hawker Hurricane Mk.IIa (January 1942 – June 1942)
- Hawker Hurricane Mk.IIb (June 1942 – August 1942)
- Hawker Hurricane Mk.IIc (August 1942 – June 1944)
- Supermarine Spitfire Mk.VIII (March 1944 – June 1945)
- Supermarine Spitfire Mk.XIVe (June 1945 – February 1948)
- Supermarine Spitfire LF.XVIe (February 1949 – March 1951)
- Airspeed Oxford T.II (February 1949 – March 1951)
- Miles Martinet TT.I (February 1949 – January 1950)
- North American Harvard TT.IIb (February 1949 – March 1951)
- Bristol Beaufighter TT.X (June 1949 – March 1951)
- English Electric Canberra PR.7 (June 1956 – December 1969)
- McDonnell Douglas Phantom FGR.2 (September 1970 – December 1975)
- SEPECAT Jaguar GR1 (September 1975 – March 1985)
- Panavia Tornado GR1 (March 1985 – March 1999)
- Eurofighter Typhoon T1 (December 2003 – April 2013)
- Eurofighter Typhoon F2 (December 2003 – April 2013)
- Lockheed Martin F-35B Lightning (April 2013 – present)

== Heritage ==
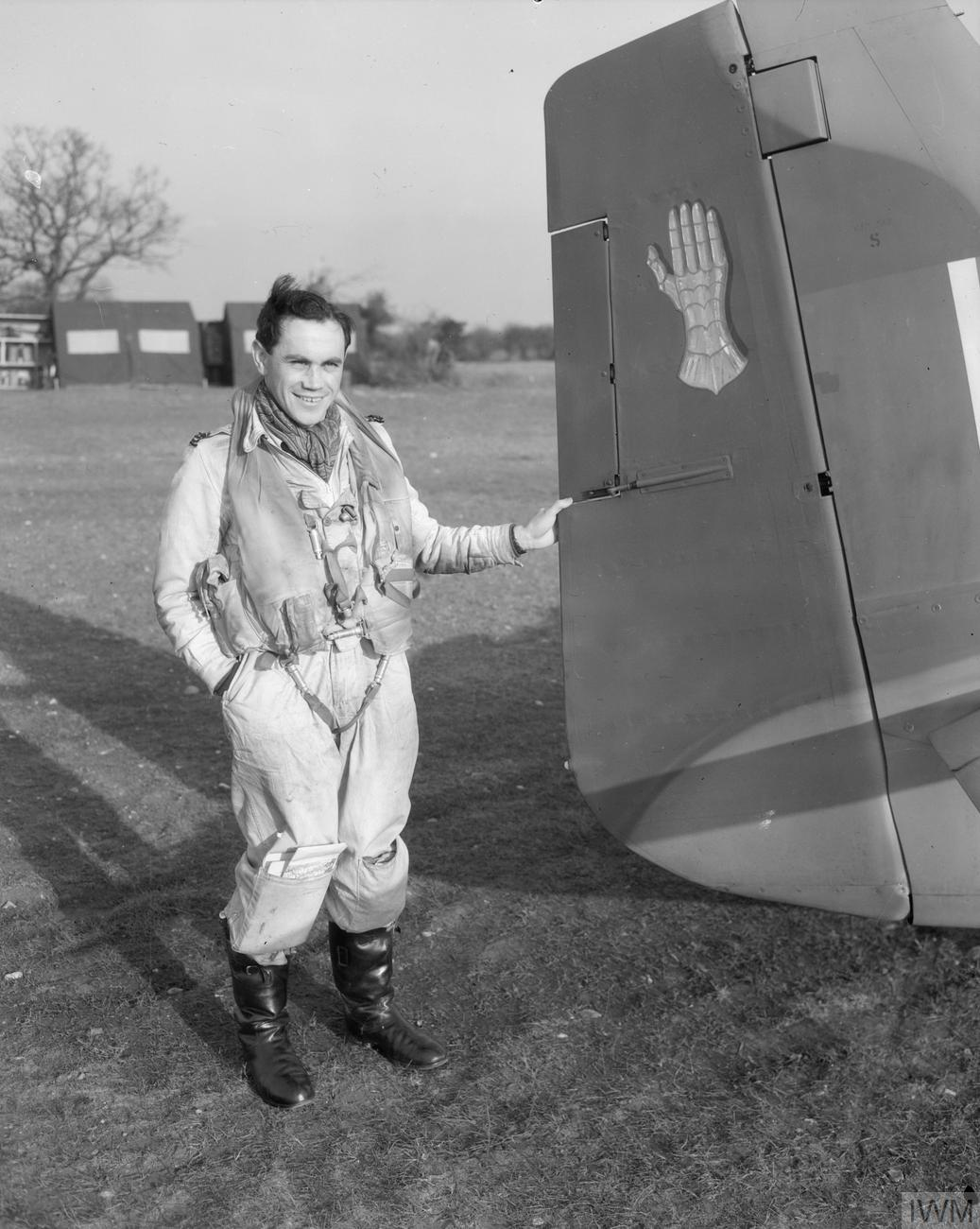
The rudder of a North American P-51 Mustang Mk.III, displaying the gauntlet badge of No. 17 Squadron during the Second World War

The squadron's heraldic badge features a gauntlet which represents the Gloster Gauntlet fighter which the squadron operated when the badge was approved by King Edward VIII in October 1936.

The squadron's motto is Excellere Contende (Latin for 'Strive to excel').

== Battle honours ==
No. 17 Squadron has received the following battle honours. Those marked with an asterisk (*) may be emblazoned on the squadron standard.

- Egypt (1915–1916)*
- Palestine (1916)*
- Macedonia (1916–1918)*
- France and Low Countries (1940)*
- Dunkirk (1940)*
- Home Defence (1940)
- Battle of Britain (1940)*
- Burma (1942)
- Arakan (1943)
- Burma (1944–1945)*
- Gulf (1991)*

== See also ==
- List of Royal Air Force aircraft squadrons

== Sources ==
- Jefford, C.G. RAF Squadrons, a Comprehensive Record of the Movement and Equipment of all RAF Squadrons and their Antecedents since 1912. Shrewsbury, Shropshire, UK: Airlife Publishing, 1988 (second edition 2001). ISBN 1-85310-053-6.
