= Operational Evaluation Unit =

Type of "reserve" squadron of the Royal Air Force

An Operational Evaluation Unit is a type of "reserve" squadron of the Royal Air Force. OEU squadrons are tasked with evaluating an aircraft's weapons, systems and performance. This is to either assist in bringing the aircraft to an operational capability, or to continually assess how to best utilize the aircraft's capability once its in service. An example of such a squadron is No. 17 Squadron of the RAF. The Squadron's role as the F-35B Operation Evaluation Unit is being tasked with introducing the JSF aircraft into service with the Royal Air Force. It is equipped with four F35Bs and currently operates from Edwards Air Force Base in the United States.

== Current OEUs ==
- F-35B Lightning Joint Strike Fighter
  - 17(R) Squadron RAF
- Typhoon Force
  - 41(R) Squadron RAF - Test and Evaluation Squadron
- ISTAR Force
  - 56(R) Squadron RAF
- Transport Force
  - 206(R) Squadron RAF
- Joint Aviation Command's Helicopter Operational Evaluation Unit
  - No. 22 Squadron RAF

== Previous OEUs ==
- AgustaWestland AW101 Merlin
  - 700 Naval Air Squadron - 2000 to 2008.
- Strike Attack OEU - to 2004
- F3 OEU - 1987 to 2004
- Air Guided Weapons OEU - to 2004
- Fast Jet & Weapons Operational Evaluation Unit. -2004 to 2010
- Panavia Tornado
- Rotary Wing Operational Evaluation & Training Unit (RWOETU). Retitled Joint Helicopter Command OEU in 2009, and now redesignated 22 Sqn (RAF Benson).

== See also ==
- Operational conversion unit
- Lynx OEU
