= Air Officer Scotland =

Senior RAF officer for Scotland

Air Officer Scotland is the senior Royal Air Force officer in Scotland, held since March 2025 by Air Commodore Mark J. Northover.

In 1962, the Air Officer Scotland role assumed responsibility for Northern Ireland, becoming Air Officer Scotland and Northern Ireland.

In December 1994 the AOSNI post departed Pitreavie Castle (the AOC Northern Maritime Air Region post was being disestablished). The station commander of RAF Leuchars became an air commodore with the additional role of being Air Officer Scotland and Northern Ireland.

The Royal Navy equivalent is Flag Officer Scotland and Northern Ireland while the British Army equivalent is General Officer Scotland.

== List of holders of the post of Air Officer Scotland ==
List Incomplete

- 1 October 1968 Air Vice-Marshal Frederick Hughes, Air Officer Commanding, No. 18 Group RAF and Air Officer Scotland and Northern Ireland
- c.1986 Air Vice-Marshal David Conway Grant Brook, Air Officer Scotland and Northern Ireland Placed on the Retired List 1989 at own request.
- July 1989 Air Vice-Marshal Jim Morris, Air Officer Scotland and Northern Ireland, based at RAF Pitreavie Castle, the home of the Northern Maritime Air Region, No. 18 Group RAF.
- c.1995 becomes an additional appointment for Station Commander, RAF Leuchars
- 2001 Air Commodore M J Routledge
- 2004 Air Commodore S Bryant
- 2006 Air Commodore J Stinton
- March 2007 Air Commodore C A Bairsto
- 13 March 2009 – 12 September 2011 Air Commodore R J Atkinson
- 12 September 2011 – 13 February 2013 Air Commodore G D A Parker
- 13 February 2013 – 17 November 2014 Air Commodore G M D Mayhew
- 17 November 2014 – January 2024 Air Vice-Marshal R Paterson CB OBE DL
- 18 January 2024 – December 2024 Air Commodore W. R. Gibson MBE ADC MA RAFR
- 24 March 2025 – Present : Air Commodore Mark J. Northover, MBE, ADC
