= Air and Space Commander =

Senior RAF Officer

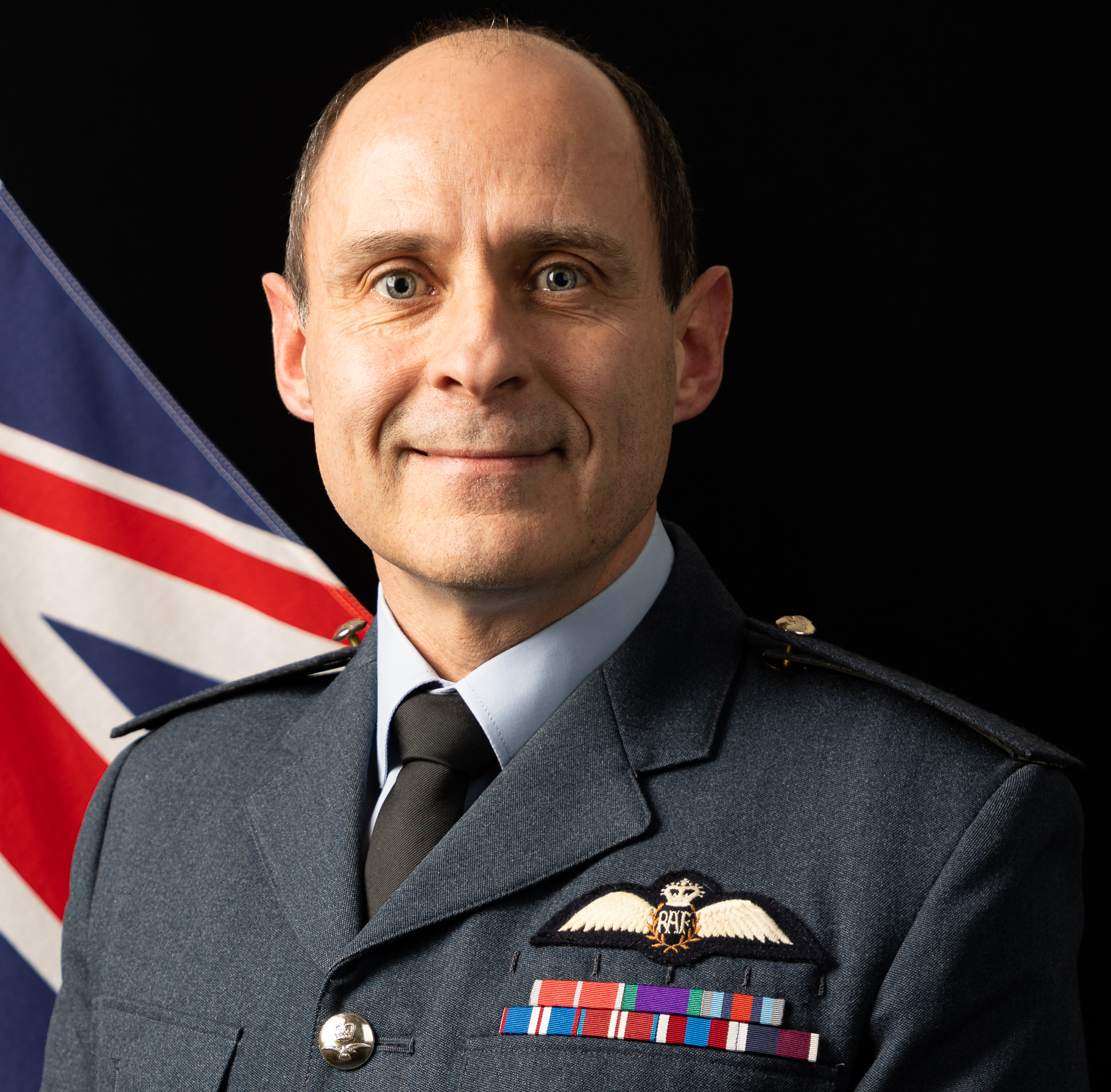
- Incumbent; Air Marshal Mark Flewin since July 2026
- Royal Air Force
- Abbreviation: ASC
- Member of: Air Force Board
- Reports to: Chief of the Air Staff
- Appointer: The King
- Website: Official Website

The Air and Space Commander is the senior Royal Air Force officer responsible for the conduct of air and space operations. The current Air and Space Commander is Air Marshal Mark Flewin who has been serving in the position since July 2026.

The Air and Space Commander supervises 1 Group, 2 Group, 11 Group (with 83 EAG within it); 22 Group, and United Kingdom Space Command.

== Previous post-holders ==
Deputy Commanders-in-Chief (Operations)

- Air Marshal Iain McNicoll, 26 February 2007 – 13 April 2010 (appointed as DC-in-C Strike Command)
- Air Marshal Richard Garwood, 14 April 2010 to Spring 2012

Deputy Commanders (Operations)

- Air Marshal Richard Garwood, Spring 2012 to April 2013
- Air Marshal Greg Bagwell, 16 April 2013 to June 2016
- Air Marshal Stuart Atha, June 2016 to May 2019
- Air Marshal Sir Gerry Mayhew, May 2019 to August 2022
- Air Marshal Harv Smyth, August 2022 to 2023

Air and Space Commander

- Air Marshal Harv Smyth, 2023 to March 2024
- Air Marshal Allan Marshall, March 2024 to July 2026
- Air Marshal Mark Flewin, July 2026 to present

== See also ==
- Deputy Chief of the Air Staff
