= Mark Flewin =

Royal Air Force Air Vice-Marshal

Air Marshal Mark Flewin CBE
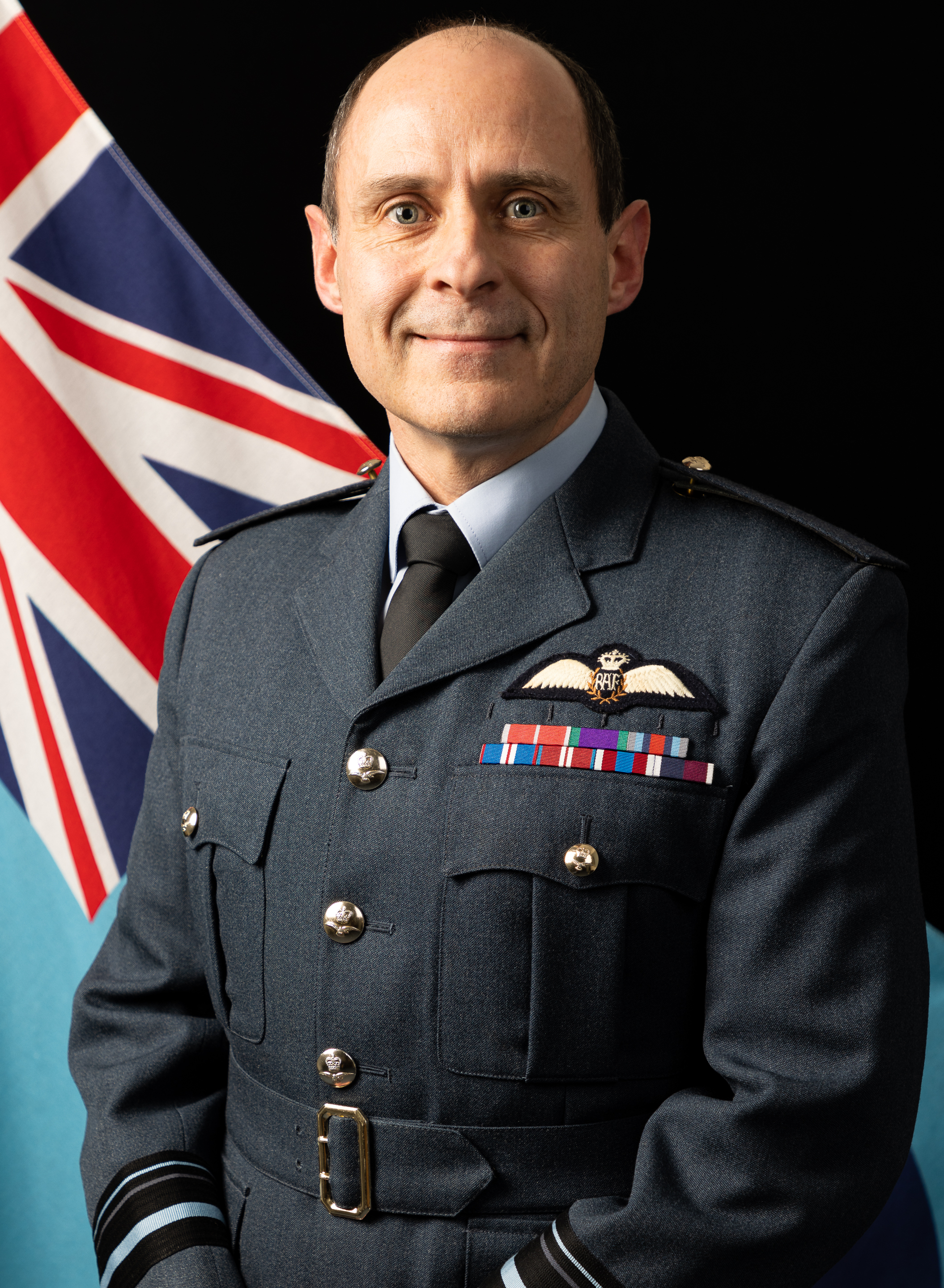
- Air Vice-Marshal Flewin in 2023
- Military career
- Allegiance: United Kingdom
- Branch: Royal Air Force
- Service years: 1998–present
- Rank: Air Marshal
- Commands: No. 1 Group RAF
- Conflicts: Iraqi no-fly zones War against the Islamic State
- Awards: Commander of the Order of the British Empire

Air Marshal Mark Robert Flewin CBE is a senior Royal Air Force officer. Since July 2026, he has been Air and Space Commander. He had served as Air Officer Commanding No. 1 Group RAF from 2023 to 2025, and then as Assistant Chief of the Defence Staff (Military Strategy) in the Ministry of Defence.

== RAF career ==
From 1 September 1996 to 1 September 1997, Flewin held a one-year commission in the Royal Air Force Volunteer Reserve as an acting pilot officer. He then graduated from university with a Bachelor of Engineering (BEng) degree. He was commissioned in the Royal Air Force (RAF) as a pilot officer on 5 April 1998. He underwent pilot training and was posted to fly the Jaguar. After qualifying as a weapons instructor, he undertook a number of operational tours, including deployment to enforce the no-fly zones over Iraq. He took command of 1 (Fighter) Squadron at RAF Leuchars in September 2012.

Flewin went on to be commander of No. 903 Expeditionary Air Wing as part of Operation Shader in 2014, chief of staff within the Air Staff at the Ministry of Defence in 2014 and chief of staff, Joint Effects at Permanent Joint Headquarters in 2016. He was promoted to group captain on 30 August 2016. In 2018, he became station commander at RAF Coningsby, and was awarded the Royal Air Force Long Service and Good Conduct Medal.

After completing the Higher Command and Staff Course at the Defence Academy, he became Head Operations, Plans & Training, United Kingdom Space Command at RAF High Wycombe in May 2021. He was appointed Air Officer Commanding No. 1 Group RAF in January 2023. Then, in March 2025, he became Assistant Chief of the Defence Staff, Military Strategy, based in the Ministry of Defence. In July 2026, he became Air and Space Commander, in succession to Allan Marshall. As such, he was promoted to air marshal on 30 July 2026.

Flewin was appointed a Commander of the Order of the British Empire (CBE) in the 2019 New Year Honours.

Military offices
Preceded by Ian Duguid	Air Officer Commanding No. 1 Group; 2023–2025	Succeeded by Mark Jackson
Preceded by Allan Marshall	Air and Space Commander; 2026–present	Incumbent
