= General Perry =

General Perry may refer to:

- Edward A. Perry (1831–1889), Confederate States Army brigadier general
- Nick Perry (British Army officer) (born c. 1972), British Army major general
- Scott Perry (born 1962), Pennsylvania Army National Guard brigadier general
- William F. Perry (1823–1901), Confederate States Army brigadier general
