= Stuart Atha =

Royal Air Force Air Marshal (born 1962)

Sir Stuart Atha
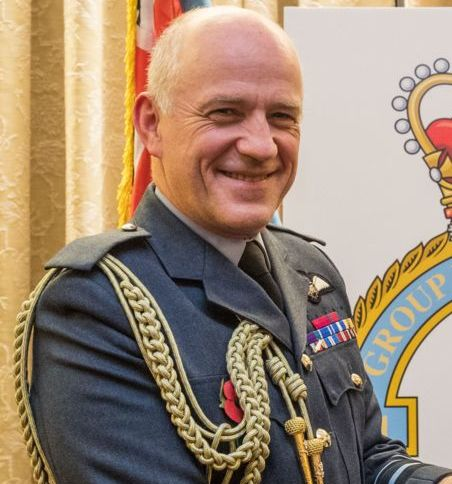
- Sir Stuart Atha in 2018
- Born: 30 April 1962 (age 64); Irvine, Ayrshire, Scotland
- Military career
- Allegiance: United Kingdom
- Branch: Royal Air Force
- Service years: 1984–2019
- Rank: Air Marshal
- Commands: No. 1 Group (2011–14); No. 83 Expeditionary Air Group (2009–10); RAF Coningsby (2006–08); No. 3 (Fighter) Squadron (2000–04)
- Conflicts: Operation Deliberate Force; Operation Allied Force; Iraq War; Operation Telic; War in Afghanistan
- Awards: Knight Commander of the Order of the British Empire; Companion of the Order of the Bath; Distinguished Service Order; Queen's Commendation for Valuable Service

Air Marshal Sir Stuart David Atha, KBE, CB, DSO (born 30 April 1962), is a former senior officer of the Royal Air Force. He led No. 3 (Fighter) Squadron from 2000 to 2004, which included deployment to Iraq on Operation Telic, commanded RAF Coningsby (2006–08), No. 83 Expeditionary Air Group (2009–10) and No. 1 Group (2011–14), and served as the Air Component Commander for security during the 2012 London Olympics. Atha was RAF Deputy Commander Operations from 2016 to 2019.

== Early life and education ==
Born in 1962 at Irvine, North Ayrshire, Scotland, the son of Wright Atha, he was educated at Kilmarnock Academy, a state secondary school in Kilmarnock, East Ayrshire. He read physics and maths at Glasgow University, graduating with a Bachelor of Science (BSc) degree in 1984. While at university, Atha was a member of the Universities of Glasgow and Strathclyde Air Squadron.

== Military career ==
Atha was commissioned in the Royal Air Force as a pilot officer on 14 October 1984, promoted to flying officer on 14 April 1985 (with seniority from 14 October 1982), flight lieutenant on 14 April 1986, and squadron leader on 1 July 1995.

Following a tour as the Harrier tactics specialist at the Air Warfare Centre, Atha attended the Advanced Command and Staff Course at Bracknell (1999–2000), and was promoted to wing commander on 1 July 1999. He then assumed command of No 3 (Fighter) Squadron, again flying the Harrier GR7.

Following his command tour, Atha joined the Ministry of Defence Directorate of Operational Capability for a short spell before becoming the Personal Staff Officer to the Chief of the Air Staff, Air Chief Marshal Sir Jock Stirrup. He was promoted to group captain on 1 January 2005. In early 2006, he attended the Higher Command and Staff Course. Atha was station commander of RAF Coningsby from 1 December 2006 to 15 December 2008.

Atha is a veteran of the conflicts in both the Balkans and Gulf with combat missions flown in Operation Deliberate Force (Bosnia 1995), Operation Allied Force (Kosovo 1999) and Operation Telic (Iraq 2003). On 31 October 2003, he was awarded the Distinguished Service Order for his leadership in Iraq. He was appointed Aide-de-Camp to the Queen on 12 February 2007.

Atha served in Afghanistan in support of Operation Herrick from October 2009 to March 2010, being awarded the Queen's Commendation for Valuable Service.

Atha's tour of the Middle East was followed in April 2010 with an appointment as Head of Joint Capability at the Ministry of Defence. He was promoted to air vice marshal and appointed Air Officer Commanding No.1 Group RAF on 12 August 2011.

Atha served as the Air Component Commander for the London Olympics Air Security in 2012. He was appointed Chief of Staff (Operations) at the Permanent Joint Headquarters in 2014; he handed over to Air Vice Marshal Gary Waterfall on 16 May 2016. He was promoted to air marshal on 27 May 2016. In June 2016, he became Deputy Commander Operations at RAF Air Command in succession to Air Marshal Greg Bagwell.

Atha was succeeded by Air Marshal Gerry Mayhew as Deputy Commander Operations on 3 May 2019 and retired from active service on 14 October 2019.

Appointed a Companion of the Order of the Bath (CB) in the 2015 New Year Honours, Atha became a Knight Commander of the Order of the British Empire (KBE) in the 2019 Birthday Honours.

== Personal life ==
In 1989, Atha married Caroline Dick. Sir Stuart and Lady Atha have five children.

== Legacy ==
A street is named after Atha in Kilmarnock; Atha Wynd.

Military offices
Preceded by Ashley Stevenson	Officer Commanding; No. 3 (Fighter) Squadron; 2000–2004	Succeeded by Bruce Hedley
Preceded by Bob Judson	Station Commander RAF Coningsby; 2006–2008	Succeeded by John Hitchcock
Preceded by Tony Barmby	Air Officer Commanding No. 83 Expeditionary Air Group; 2009–2010	Succeeded by Ashley Stevenson
Preceded by Mark Abraham	Head of Joint Capability, Air Command; 2010–2011	Succeeded by Edward Stringer
Preceded by Greg Bagwell	Air Officer Commanding No. 1 Group; 2011–2014	Succeeded by Gary Waterfall
Preceded by Greg Bagwell	Deputy Commander Operations; 2016–2019	Succeeded by Sir Gerry Mayhew
