= Gerry Mayhew =

Royal Air Force Air Marshal (born 1969)

Sir Gerry Mayhew
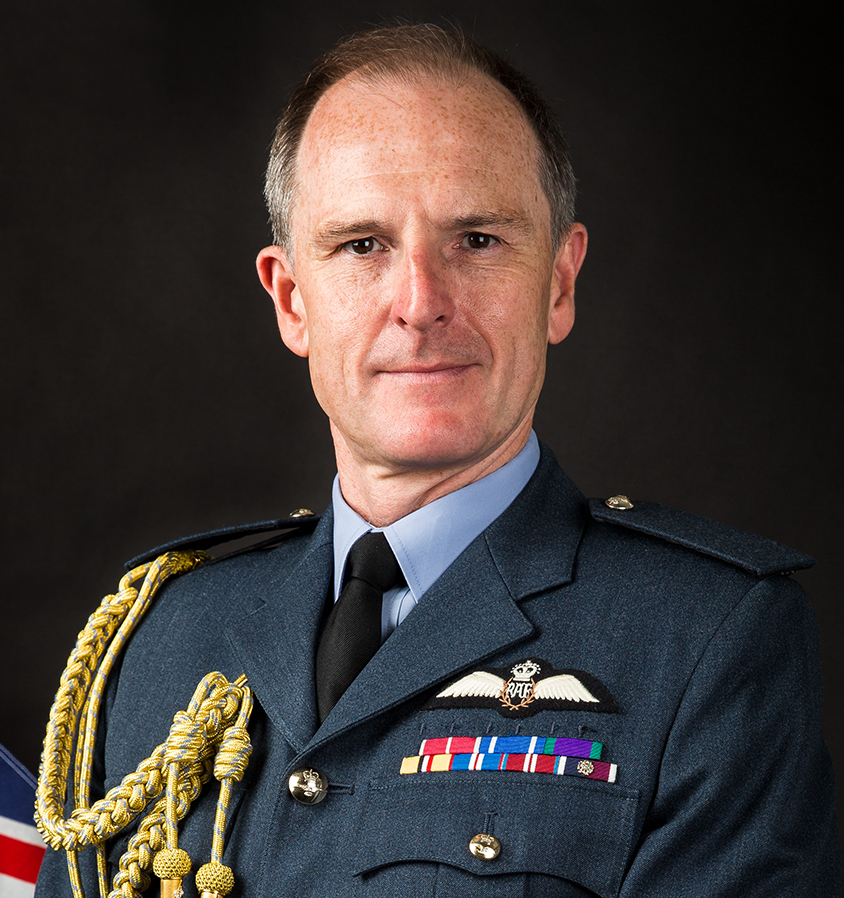
- Air Marshal Mayhew in 2019
- Born: 15 February 1969 (age 57); Sutton Coldfield, Warwickshire
- Military career
- Allegiance: United Kingdom
- Branch: Royal Air Force
- Service years: 1988–2022
- Rank: Air Marshal
- Commands: No. 1 Group (2016–18); RAF Leuchars (2013–14); No. 13 Squadron RAF (2007–09)
- Conflicts: Iraq War
- Awards: Knight Commander of the Order of the Bath; Commander of the Order of the British Empire

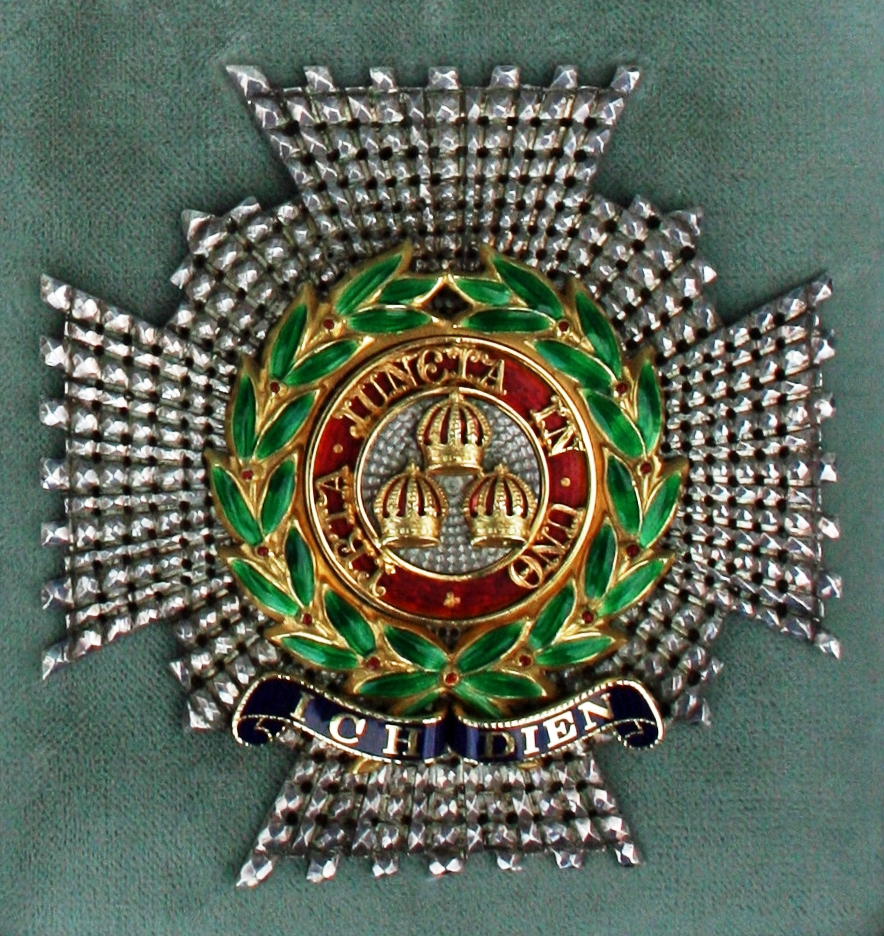
KCB breast star

Air Marshal Sir Gerard Michael David Mayhew KCB, CBE (born 15 February 1969), is a former senior Royal Air Force officer, who served as Deputy Commander Operations, Headquarters Air Command from May 2019 until August 2022.

== Early life and education ==
Born in 1969 at Sutton Coldfield, Warwickshire (now in the West Midlands), Mayhew was educated at St Benedict's Catholic High School, a voluntary-aided Catholic school in Alcester, Warwickshire and then Alcester Grammar School.

== Military career ==
Mayhew was commissioned into the Royal Air Force on 28 July 1988 as an acting pilot officer. He served as an air traffic control officer from 1988 to 1990. In 1990, he trained as a pilot and became a Qualified Weapons Instructor (QWI). His early career as a pilot was spent flying the Jaguar and Tornado, accumulating over 3000 flying hours. From 2007 to 2009, he served as Officer Commanding No. 13 Squadron RAF.

In January 2013, Mayhew was appointed Air Officer Scotland and Officer Commanding RAF Leuchars. One of his main duties was to oversee the transfer of Leuchars, then an RAF station, to the British Army as a barracks; this was finalised in March 2015. He stepped down as Air Officer Scotland on 17 November 2014. From April 2015 to April 2016, he was a member of the Strategic Defence and Security Review Team in the Cabinet Office. He was appointed a Commander of the Order of the British Empire (CBE) in the 2015 Queen's Birthday Honours, and then on 28 April 2016 promoted air vice marshal becoming Air Officer Commanding No. 1 Group.

In August 2018, Mayhew succeeded Air Vice Marshal Sir Michael Wigston as Assistant Chief of the Air Staff. In May 2019, he became Deputy Commander Operations, Headquarters Air Command and was promoted Air Marshal. Mayhew was advanced as a Knight Commander of the Order of the Bath (KCB) in the 2022 New Year Honours.

In April 2022 Mayhew accepted the Freedom of Causeway Coasts and Glens Borough on behalf of the RAF at a ceremony in Limavady, County Londonderry. The town held a parade and saw a fly past of a Boeing P-8 Poseidon. The RAF was based at Limavady and the nearby village of Ballykelly during World War Two.

A Freeman of the City of London, Sir Gerry is a Liveryman of the Worshipful Company of Haberdashers.

Mayhew was criticised following an employment tribunal case in October 2023 when he was deemed to have offered "hollow and unconvincing evidence" for a claim by a serving military officer.

Military offices
Preceded by Gavin Parker	Station Commander RAF Leuchars; 2013–2014	Post disbanded
Preceded by Gavin Parker	Air Officer Scotland; 2013–2014	Succeeded by Ross Paterson
Preceded by Gary Waterfall	Air Officer Commanding No. 1 Group; 2016–2018	Succeeded by Harv Smyth
Preceded by Michael Wigston	Assistant Chief of the Air Staff; 2018–2019	Succeeded by Ian Gale
Preceded by Sir Stuart Atha	Deputy Commander Operations; 2019–2022	Succeeded by Harv Smyth
