= Allan Marshall (RAF officer) =

Royal Air Force Air Vice-Marshal

Air Marshal Allan Marshall OBE
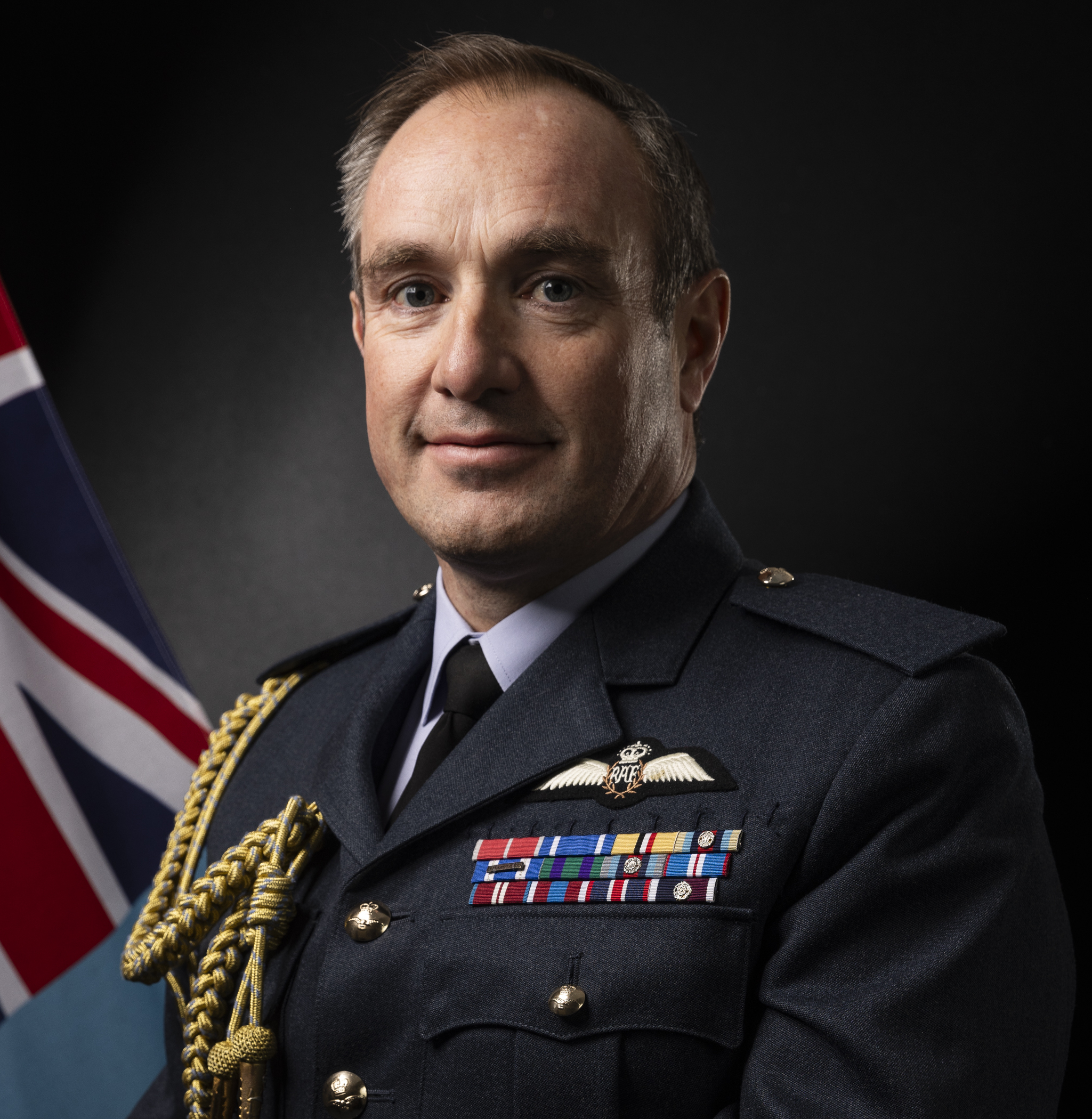
- Marshall in 2024
- Born: 3 May 1972 (age 54)
- Spouse: Air Marshal Suraya Marshall
- Military career
- Allegiance: United Kingdom
- Branch: Royal Air Force
- Service years: 1991–present
- Rank: Air Marshal
- Commands: No. 1 Group RAF; RAF Waddington; No. V (AC) Squadron
- Conflicts: Iraq War; War in Afghanistan
- Awards: Officer of the Order of the British Empire

Air Marshal Allan Paul Marshall, OBE (born 3 May 1972) is a senior Royal Air Force officer, who since July 2026 has been Chief of Joint Operations and therefore head of the Permanent Joint Headquarters.

== Early life and education ==
Marshall was born on 3 May 1972 in Worcester, Worcestershire, England. He studied engineering at Pembroke College, Cambridge, graduating from the University of Cambridge with a Bachelor of Arts (BA) degree.

== RAF career ==
Marshall was commissioned into the Royal Air Force (RAF) on 2 September 1991 with the rank of acting pilot officer. Having completed an in-service degree, he was re-graded as a pilot officer on 15 July 1994. He was promoted to flying officer on 15 January 1995 with seniority in that rank from 15 July 1992. His early career consisted of flying the Harrier jump jet.

He served as officer commanding No. V (AC) Squadron. He went on to become station commander at RAF Waddington in March 2016, and Head of Military Operations in the Ministry of Defence in December 2018.

In February 2020 it was announced that he would be appointed to the post of Air Officer Commanding No. 1 Group with effect from March 2020. On 22 November 2021, Marshall took up the post of Assistant Chief of Defence Staff (Operations & Commitments) in succession to Major General Charles Stickland. On 8 March 2024, he was promoted to air marshal and appointed as Air and Space Commander in succession to Harv Smyth. In July 2026, he was appointed Chief of Joint Operations and therefore head of the Permanent Joint Headquarters.

Marshall was appointed an Officer of the Order of the British Empire in the 2014 New Year Honours.

== Personal life ==
Marshall is married to Air Marshal Suraya Marshall, and together they have two children.

Military offices
Preceded by Harv Smyth	Air Officer Commanding No. 1 Group; 2020–2021	Succeeded by Ian Duguid
Preceded by Charles Stickland	Assistant Chief of the Defence Staff (Operations & Commitments); 2021–2024	Succeeded by Steve Moorhouse
Preceded by Harv Smyth	Air and Space Commander; 2024–2026	Succeeded by Mark Flewin
Preceded by Nicholas Perry	Chief of Joint Operations; 2026–present	Incumbent
