= Charles Stickland =

British general (born 1968)

Lieutenant General Sir Charles Stickland KCB OBE
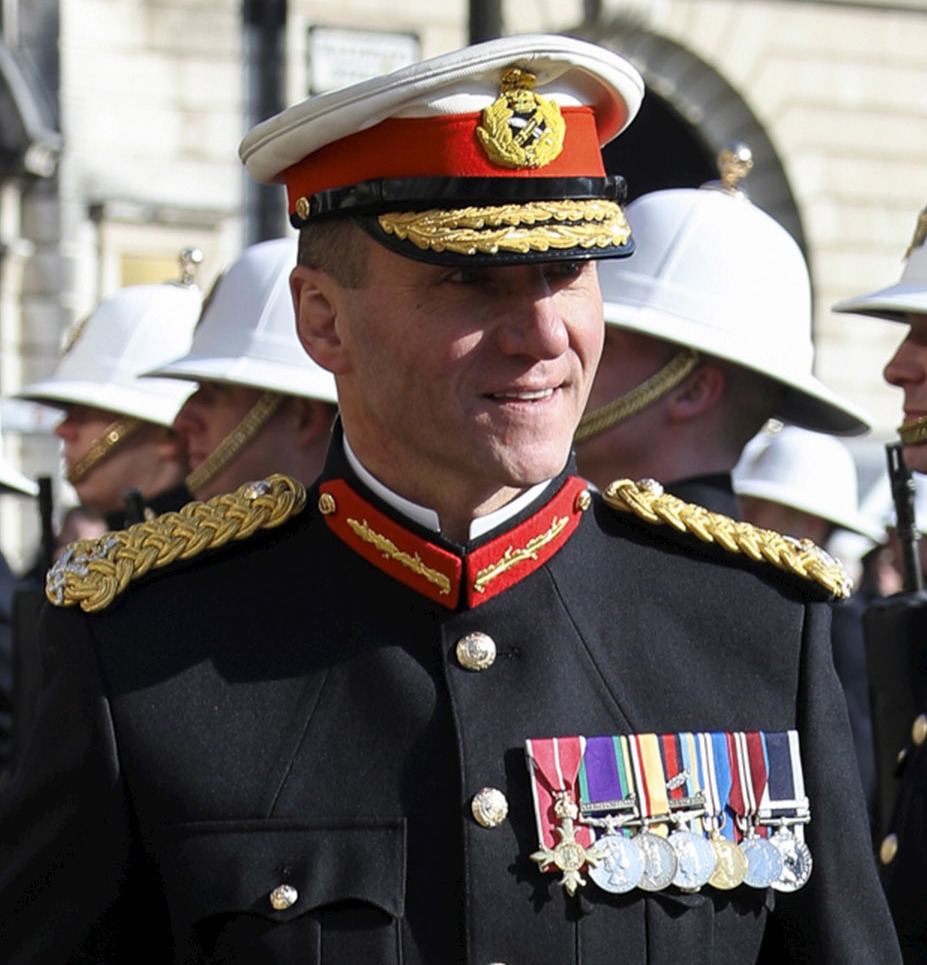
- Major General Stickland in 2018
- Born: 16 May 1968 (age 58); Pembury, Kent, England
- Military career
- Allegiance: United Kingdom
- Branch: Royal Marines
- Service years: 1987–2025
- Rank: Lieutenant General
- Commands: Chief of Joint Operations; Commandant General Royal Marines; 3 Commando Brigade; 42 Commando
- Conflicts: Operation Banner; Iraq War; War in Afghanistan
- Awards: Knight Commander of the Order of the Bath; Officer of the Order of the British Empire; Queen's Commendation for Valuable Service

Lieutenant General Sir Charles Richard Stickland, KCB, OBE (born 16 May 1968) is a former senior Royal Marines officer, who served as the Chief of Joint Operations from November 2021 to November 2024. He was Commandant General Royal Marines from January 2018 to June 2019.

== Early life and education ==
Stickland was born on 16 May 1968 in Pembury, Kent, England. He was educated at Sevenoaks School, a private school in Kent. He studied at City University, London, graduating with a Bachelor of Science degree in systems and management science and a Master of Arts degree in defence studies.

== Military career ==
Stickland was commissioned into the Royal Marines in 1987. He first saw service in Northern Ireland and went on to complete amphibious operations in the Mediterranean and Far East on anti-smuggling operations. In 1999 he was selected for Staff College and spent time in the Ministry of Defence in procurement; from there he became the Ministry of Defence lead for West and Southern Africa, co-ordinating military activity across the region.

Stickland became Senior UK Liaison Officer with the US XVIII Airborne Corps in Baghdad in 2005 and Chief of Staff of the UK Task Force in Afghanistan in 2006. On 19 July 2007, he was awarded the Queen's Commendation for Valuable Service "in recognition of gallant and distinguished services in Afghanistan during the period 1st October 2006 to 31st March 2007". He returned for another tour in Afghanistan as commander 42 Commando in 2008. On 11 September 2009, he was appointed Officer of the Order of the British Empire (OBE) "in recognition of gallant and distinguished services in Afghanistan during the period 1st October 2008 to 31st March 2009".

On promotion to colonel in 2010, he became team leader of the Fleet Operational Policy team on the 'Gulf Preparedness Initiative' as well as oversight of counter-piracy operations and the Maritime Trade Organisation node in Dubai. He then went on to be Chief of Staff of the Joint Force Headquarters in 2012 and on completion of the Higher Command and Staff Course he became commander of 3 Commando Brigade in 2014. After that he became Chief Joint Force Operations in 2016, a role that entailed a number of non-Combatant Evacuation and Humanitarian Assistance operations.

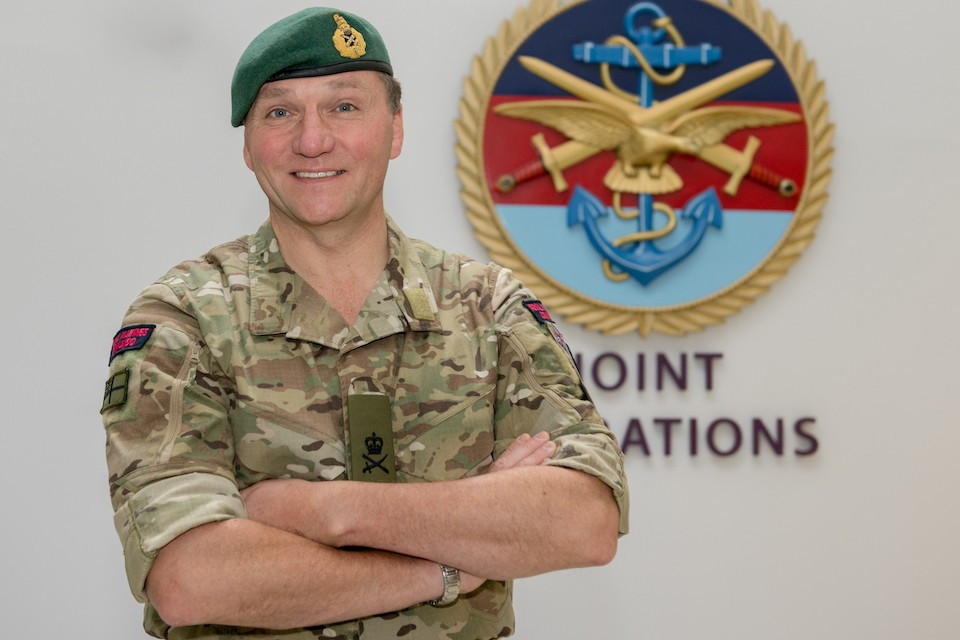
Lieutenant General Stickland as Chief of Joint Operations

Promoted to major general in October 2017, Stickland was appointed commander of Operation Atalanta on 7 November. He became Commandant General Royal Marines in January 2018. He handed over command of Commandant General Royal Marines to Major General Matthew Holmes in June 2019. He was appointed a Companion of the Order of the Bath in the 2019 Birthday Honours. He became Assistant Chief of the Defence Staff (Operations and Commitments) at the Ministry of Defence in June 2019, and Chief of Joint Operations (CJO) at the Permanent Joint Headquarters in November 2021. With the new appointment of CJO, Stickland was promoted to lieutenant general in December 2021. In the 2024 King's Birthday Honours, he was promoted to Knight Commander of the Order of the Bath. He stepped down as CJO in November 2024, and was succeeded by Nick Perry. Strickland retired from the Royal Marines on 8 August 2025.

== Personal life ==
Stickland is married to Mishy and has three sons. His interests include rugby, climbing and skiing.

Military offices
Preceded by Robert Magowan	Commandant General Royal Marines; 2018–2019	Succeeded by Matthew Holmes
Preceded by Andrew Turner	Assistant Chief of the Defence Staff (Operations & Commitments); 2019–2021	Succeeded by Allan Marshall
Preceded by Sir Ben Key	Chief of Joint Operations; 2021–2024	Succeeded by Nick Perry
