= Harv Smyth =

Chief of the UK Air Staff since 2025

Air Chief Marshal Sir Harv Smyth KCB OBE DFC ADC
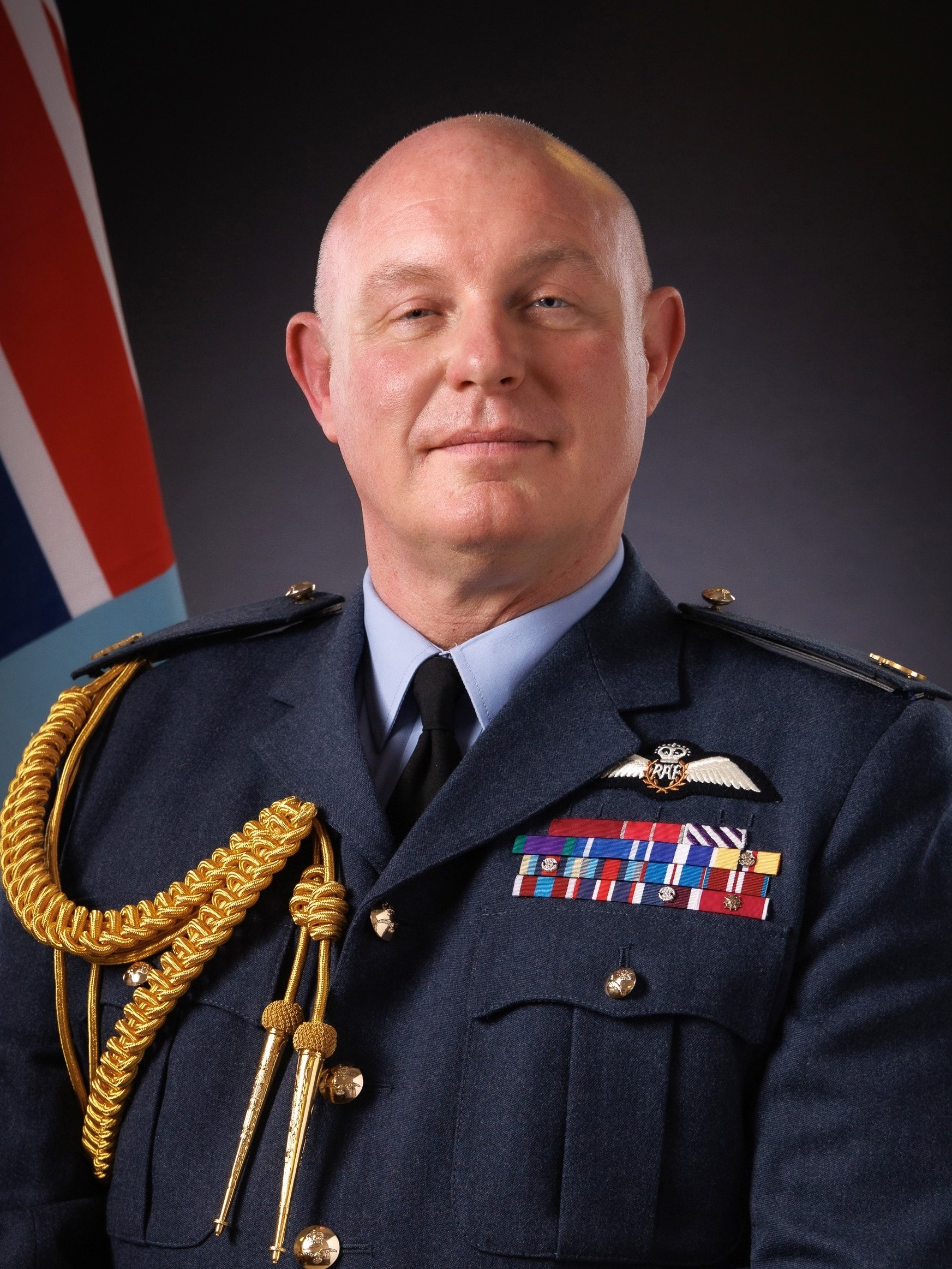
- Air Chief Marshal Smyth in 2025
- Military career
- Allegiance: United Kingdom
- Branch: Royal Air Force
- Service years: 1991–present
- Rank: Air Chief Marshal
- Commands: Chief of the Air Staff; Air and Space Commander; No. 1 Group; RAF Marham; No. 4 Squadron
- Conflicts: Kosovo War; Iraq War; War in Afghanistan
- Awards: Knight Commander of the Order of the Bath; Officer of the Order of the British Empire; Distinguished Flying Cross; Officer of the Legion of Merit (United States); Meritorious Service Medal (United States)

Air Chief Marshal Sir Harvey Smyth, KCB, OBE, DFC, ADC is a senior British Royal Air Force officer, who has been Chief of the Air Staff since August 2025.

Previously, he served as Air Officer Commanding No. 1 Group (2018–2020), Director Space, in the Ministry of Defence (2020–2022), Air and Space Commander (2022–2024), Deputy Chief of the Defence Staff (Military Strategy and Operations) (2024–2025).

== Early life and education ==
Smyth grew up in Northern Ireland during The Troubles. He was educated at Lurgan College, a non-denominational grammar school in Lurgan, County Armagh. He received a Sixth Form scholarship from the Royal Air Force (RAF), and was a member of the Army Cadets while at school.

== RAF career ==
Smyth joined the RAF in 1991, being commissioned as an acting pilot officer on 9 May. His rank was made substantive on 9 May 1992 and advanced to flying officer twelve months later, before he was posted to the Harrier Force in 1995. He was advanced to flight lieutenant on 9 November 1996. Smyth served with No. 1 (Fighter) Squadron as weapons instructor from 1999, and was promoted squadron leader on 1 July 2001. As a Harrier pilot, he flew operational missions over Bosnia, Kosovo, Serbia, Iraq and Afghanistan.

Smyth served in the 2003 invasion of Iraq, for which he was awarded the Distinguished Flying Cross. Smyth was promoted to wing commander on 1 January 2006, and commanded No. 4 Squadron from 1 September 2008 to 31 March 2010.

Smyth was appointed an Officer of the Order of the British Empire (OBE) in the 2011 New Year Honours, was subsequently advanced to group captain, and appointed the United Kingdom's National Director of the Lockheed Martin F-35 Lightning II procurement programme in Washington, D.C. He was aide-de-camp to The Queen from 13 December 2013 to 30 July 2015.

=== Air officer ===
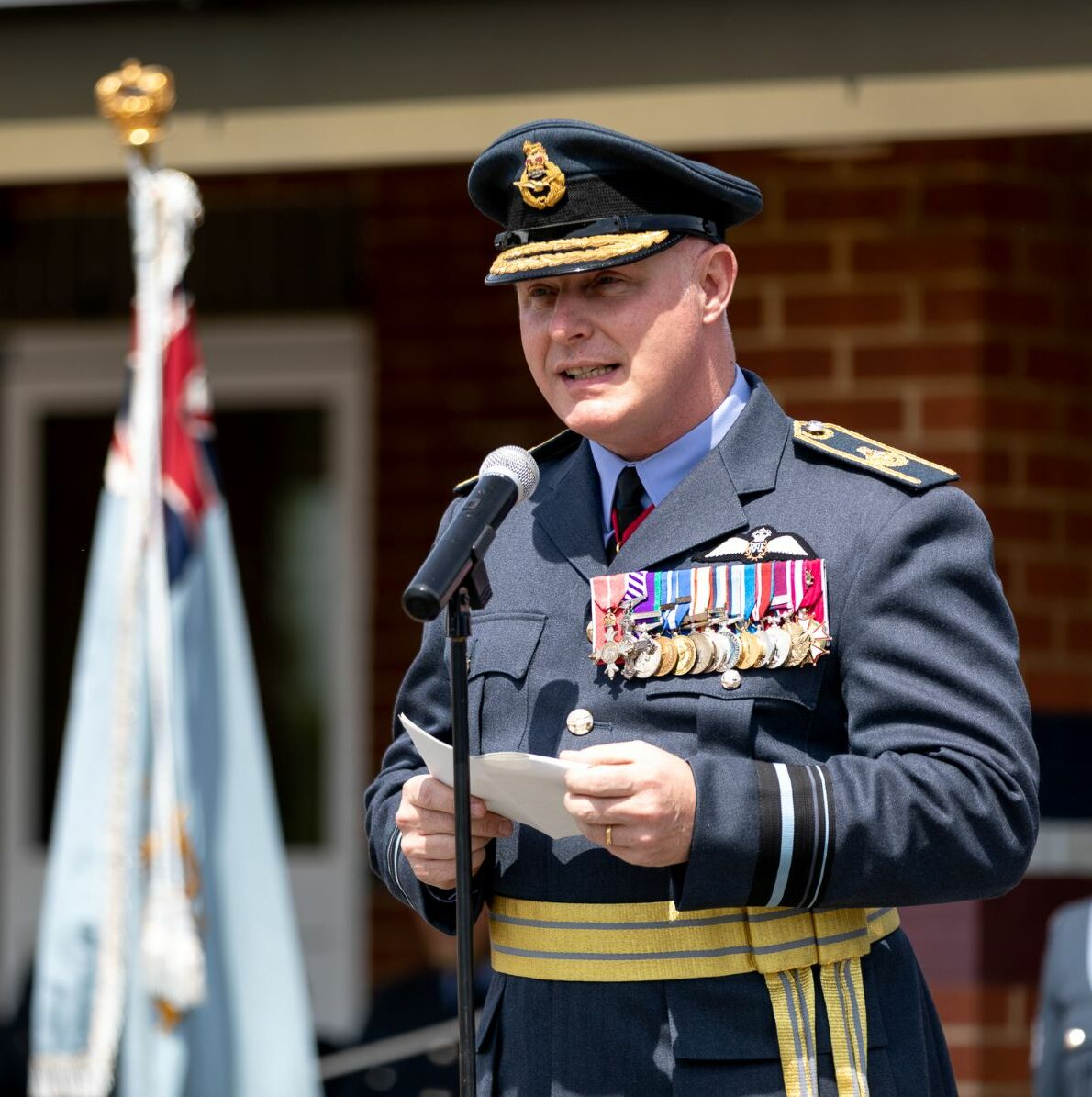
Air Vice-Marshal Harvey Smyth making an address in June 2022

As an air commodore, Smyth was appointed Honorary Colonel of the 2nd (Northern Ireland) Battalion, Army Cadet Force from 1 June 2016, and attended the Higher Command and Staff Course at the Defence Academy of the United Kingdom in 2017. Following a stint as the Combined Air and Space Operations Centre Director at the Al Udeid Air Base in Doha, Smyth was promoted air vice-marshal and appointed Air Officer Commanding No. 1 Group in July 2018. He was awarded the United States' Legion of Merit, and was granted permission to wear the award by the Queen on 5 April 2019.

Smyth was appointed as the first Director Space in February 2020, and was succeeded in command of No. 1 Group by Air Vice-Marshal Allan Marshall. Reporting on Smyth's new post, Defense News wrote that "up to 25 civilians and military personnel involved in finance, policy and capabilities will support the new space directorate" in the Ministry of Defence's Main Building. It also wrote that No. 23 Squadron RAF had been reformed, as a space squadron, "responsible for day-to-day space command-and-control" and the remote control and manoeuvring of satellites. Smyth was appointed a Companion of the Order of the Bath (CB) in the 2020 Birthday Honours. He was promoted to air marshal on 26 August 2022, on his appointment as Deputy Commander Operations. In December 2023, it was announced that he would be the next Deputy Chief of the Defence Staff (Military Strategy and Operations); he succeeded Sir Roland Walker in the role in March 2024.

In July 2025, the Ministry of Defence announced that Smyth be the next Chief of the Air Staff. He was promoted to air chief marshal and took up the post on 29 August 2025, in succession to Sir Richard Knighton, thereby becoming head of the RAF. He was appointed an aide-de-camp (ADC) to the King on the same day.

He was advanced to Knight Commander of the Order of the Bath (KCB) in the 2026 New Year Honours.

On 26 October 2026, he gave a speech setting out RAF strategy, which had been instructed to be ready to fight against Russia by 2030. He stated that technological change would revolutionise warfare, limiting the role of military personnel "towards the outside" and ease the pressure on recruitment. As an example he indicated that Typhoon fighters would be accompanied by four AI-enabled drones patrolling hundreds of miles away. Smyth predicted that "AI will enable warfare that speeds well beyond human comprehension, meaning that our role will shift towards the outside, and it will shift towards controlling the activity and setting the guardrails".

== Honours and decorations ==
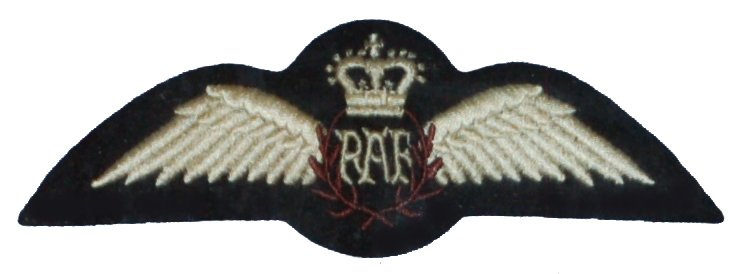

Ribbon	Description	Notes
	Most Honourable Order of the Bath	Appointed Knight Commander in 2026; appointed Companion in 2020
	Most Excellent Order of the British Empire	Appointed Officer in 2011
	Distinguished Flying Cross	2003
	General Service Medal (1962)	With clasp
	NATO Medal for the Former Yugoslavia	With clasp
	NATO Medal for Kosovo	With clasp
	Iraq Medal	With rosette
	Operational Service Medal for Afghanistan	With clasp
	Operational Service Medal Iraq and Syria	
	Queen Elizabeth II Golden Jubilee Medal	6 February 2002
	Queen Elizabeth II Diamond Jubilee Medal	6 February 2012
	Queen Elizabeth II Platinum Jubilee Medal	6 February 2022
	King Charles III Coronation Medal	6 May 2023
	Royal Air Force Long Service and Good Conduct Medal	With 1 bar
	Officer of the Legion of Merit	Appointed in 2019

== Private activities ==
Smyth is patron of the Jon Egging Trust which commemorates Flight Lieutenant Jon Egging, who died in an accident in 2011 as part of the Red Arrows flying display team after succumbing to g-LOC.

Military offices
Preceded by Gerry Mayhew	Air Officer Commanding No. 1 Group; 2018–2020	Succeeded by Allan Marshall
Preceded by Sir Gerry Mayhew	Deputy Commander Operations; Renamed Air and Space Commander in 2023; 2022–2024	Succeeded by Allan Marshall
Preceded by Sir Roland Walker	Deputy Chief of the Defence Staff (Military Strategy and Operations); 2024–2025	Succeeded by Sir Charles Collins
Preceded by Sir Rich Knighton	Chief of the Air Staff; 2025–present	Incumbent
