= Matt Holmes (Royal Marines officer) =

Royal Marines general (1967–2021)

Major General Matt Holmes CBE DSO
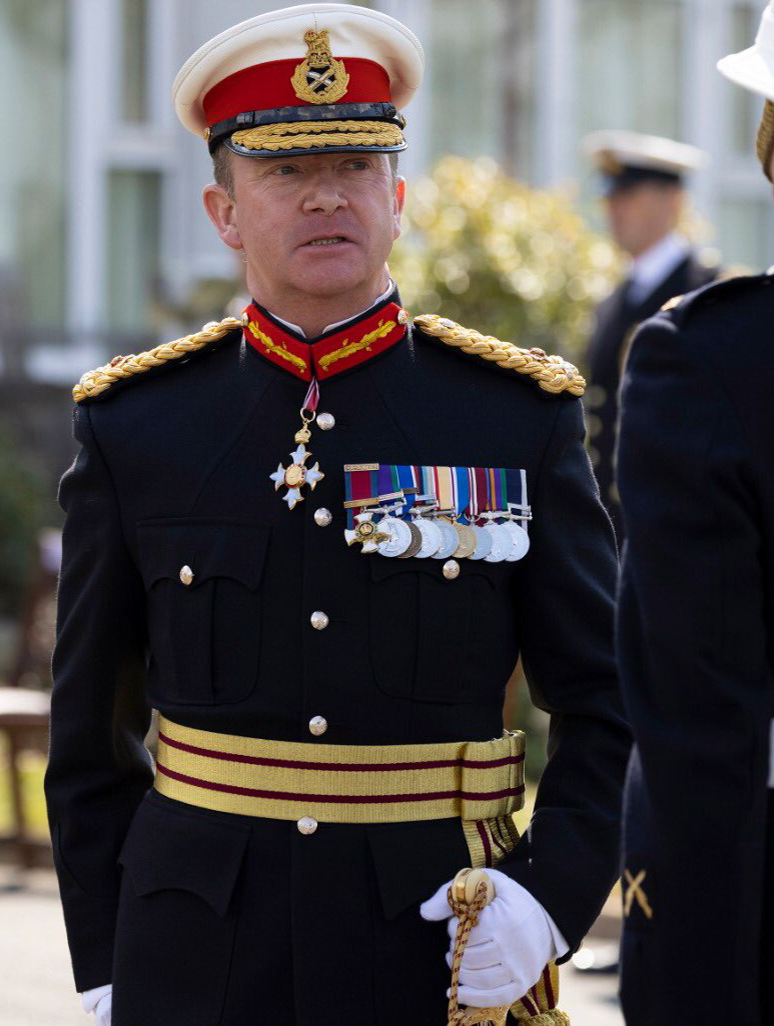
- Holmes during the last guard inspection as Commandant General Royal Marines, 2021
- Born: Matthew John Holmes; 29 June 1967; Chalfont St Giles, Buckinghamshire, England
- Died: 2 October 2021 (aged 54); Winchester, Hampshire, England
- Education: University of Exeter (BA); King's College London (MA)
- Military career
- Allegiance: United Kingdom
- Branch: Royal Marines
- Service years: 1988–2021
- Rank: Major General
- Commands: Commandant General Royal Marines; 42 Commando
- Conflicts: Operation Banner; Kosovo War; Iraq War; War in Afghanistan
- Awards: Commander of the Order of the British Empire; Companion of the Distinguished Service Order; Legion of Merit (United States)

Major General Matthew John Holmes, CBE, DSO (29 June 1967 – 2 October 2021) was a British senior Royal Marines officer who served for more than three decades in the armed forces. After studying economics at the University of Exeter, he joined the Royal Marines and undertook early tours of duty to Norway, the Far East, Northern Ireland and Zimbabwe. After being deployed to Kosovo and Afghanistan, he commanded 42 Commando Royal Marines from 2006 to 2008 and was appointed a Companion of the Distinguished Service Order for his leadership in Afghanistan, as well as the United States Legion of Merit for his exceptionally meritorious service. Holmes served as Commandant General Royal Marines from 2019 to 2021.

== Early life and education ==
Matthew John Holmes was born on 29 June 1967 in Chalfont St Giles, Buckinghamshire, England, to Christopher Holmes and Linda Holmes. He was educated at Desborough School, a comprehensive school in Maidenhead, Berkshire. He studied at the University of Exeter (BA, Economics) and King's College London (MA Defence Studies).

== Military career ==
Holmes was commissioned into the Royal Marines in 1988. He first served with 42 Commando then trained in Norway with 40 Commando, before being deployed to West Belfast in 1993–94 on Operation Banner during The Troubles. He was deployed to Zimbabwe then Brunei with 45 Commando before redeploying to Northern Ireland, this time to South Armagh in command of a company of 42 Commando.

Promoted to major, Holmes graduated from Staff College, receiving his Master of Arts in Defence Studies in 2000. As operations officer of 3 Commando Brigade, he deployed to Operation Agricola IV (Kosovo), as part of Kosovo Force, from August 2000 to February 2001. Following that, Holmes joined coalition forces in Afghanistan for Operation Jacana from March to July 2002. On his return he was promoted to lieutenant colonel then moved to the Permanent Joint Headquarters as an operations team leader; in that function he supervised Operation Coral in the Congo, a French-led multinational peacekeeping mission during the Second Congo War in 2003, followed by the deployment of the Spearhead Battalion to Kosovo upon NATO emergency request in March 2004. Holmes later deployed to Iraq in the headquarters of the Multi-National Division (South East) in Basra during Operation Telic.

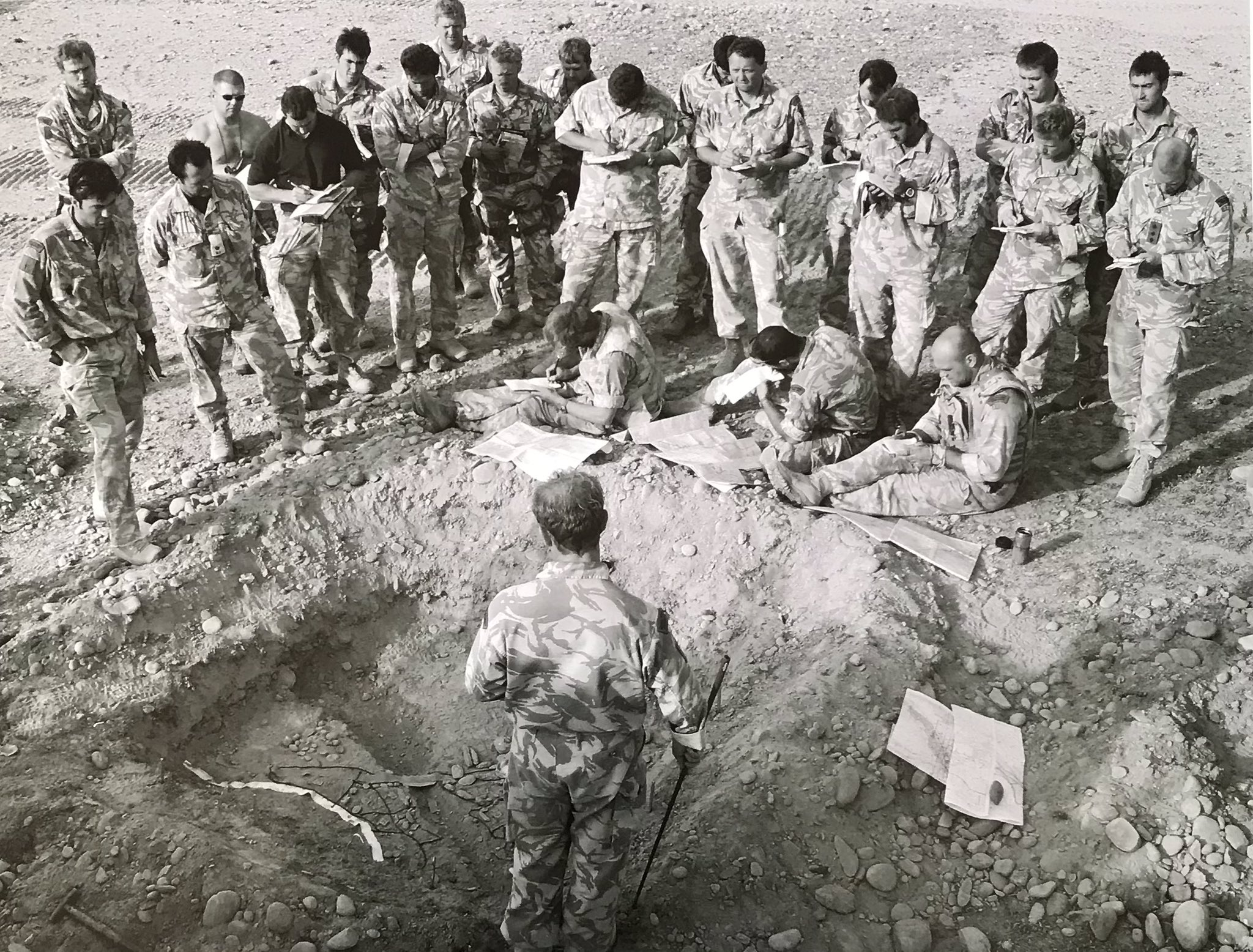
Holmes briefing his men during Operation Herrick 5 in Afghanistan c. 2006

Holmes became commanding officer of 42 Commando Battle Group on 27 March 2006 and deployed to Afghanistan with his unit on Operation Herrick V, in support of NATO multinational operations in Helmand Province with the backing of Afghan government, from September 2006. For his leadership in Afghanistan, he was appointed a Companion of the Distinguished Service Order in July 2007, while under his command 42 Commando was awarded one Conspicuous Gallantry Cross, seven Military Crosses and seven Mentions in Despatches. In December 2009 he served as military assistant to the Vice-Chief of the Defence Staff, the deputy to the professional head of the British Armed Forces, during the 2010 Strategic Defence and Security Review, a major review of UK defence strategy. Holmes completed the postgraduate Higher Command and Staff Course in 2012 at the Defence Academy in Shrivenham.

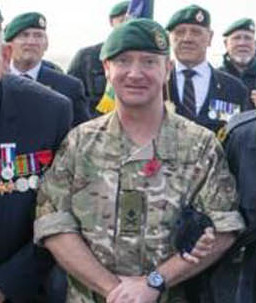
Holmes in November 2019 with 47 Commando veterans

After being promoted to brigadier on 19 March 2013, Holmes became Head of Future and Maritime teams at the Development, Concepts and Doctrine Centre, the Ministry of Defence's think tank. Following the 2015–16 UK floods, Holmes was asked to conduct a review of national flood preparedness and response at behest of "Flood Minister" Rory Stewart. In April 2016 he was selected as the first chief of staff of Standing Joint Force Headquarters, a high-readiness expeditionary command and control headquarters based in Northwood, which he oversaw from establishment to full operating capacity in just two years. On 9 May 2018 he was promoted to major general and appointed director of the Resolute Support Mission Ministerial Advisory Group in Afghanistan. He was then Deputy Adviser to Afghanistan's Ministry of Interior in Kabul, then Senior British Military Representative in Afghanistan from November of the same year. He returned to the UK in May 2019.

Holmes was appointed Commandant General Royal Marines on 14 June 2019, taking over from Major General Charles Stickland. In that role, and in the context of the Integrated Review, Holmes oversaw the implementation of the Future Commando Force, the modernisation project of the Royal Marines; as a component of the programme the Vanguard Strike Company was formed in July 2020. Having served only 22 months of the three-year appointment, he was removed from the post on 30 April 2021 due to restructuring of the role into a three-star appointment. He was succeeded as Commandant General by Lieutenant General Robert Magowan.

Holmes was appointed a Commander of the Order of the British Empire as part of the 2019 Birthday Honours for his "outstanding contribution to the Royal Marines and to the United Kingdom's defence and security interests". Holmes was awarded the United States Legion of Merit "for his outstanding service" in Afghanistan as military commander and as deputy adviser to the Afghanistan Ministry of Interior Affairs. Holmes was a pallbearer at the funeral of Prince Philip, Duke of Edinburgh in April 2021, during the procession to the steps of St George's Chapel, Windsor Castle.

== Death and funeral ==
Holmes died on 2 October 2021 at his home in Winchester, aged 54. A coroner's inquest heard that Holmes' death was as a result of hanging. The inquest looked into how Holmes' removal from the position of Commandant General Royal Marines, as well as the breakdown of his marriage, had impacted him; the inquest also heard how firearms officers from Hampshire Constabulary attended an incident at Holmes' home address on 22 September 2021 in response to a welfare call, which resulted in the seizure of a licensed firearm. The Hampshire coroner concluded that Holmes' death was contributed to by "substantial stress".

Holmes' funeral took place on 13 October 2021 at Winchester Cathedral. Prior to the funeral, Lieutenant General Robert Magowan sent a letter to retired commanders, appealing for calm following disputes between the Marines and the Royal Navy. In addition to Holmes' widow and two children, more than 700 people attended the funeral, including the Defence Secretary, Ben Wallace, the outgoing Chief of the Defence Staff, General Sir Nick Carter, his replacement, Admiral Sir Tony Radakin, and Rear Admiral Mike Utley, Commander of the UK's Strike Force. Every unit of the Royal Marines was represented, including 42 Commando. Flag bearers from the Royal Marines Association and the United States Marine Corps, lined the approach to the cathedral as the hearse carrying the coffin approached. Holmes' coffin, draped in the Union Flag with his Royal Marines cap resting on top, was carried into the cathedral by the same pallbearers who had officiated with him at the Duke of Edinburgh's funeral. The Royal Marines Band Service performed the music ending with the Last Post and God Save the Queen. As the ceremony ended a three-volley salute was fired by Marines from the Commando Training Centre Royal Marines.

Military offices
Preceded by Charles Stickland	Commandant General Royal Marines; 2019–2021	Succeeded by Robert Magowan
