= Gary Waterfall =

Royal Air Force Air Vice-Marshal (born 1967)

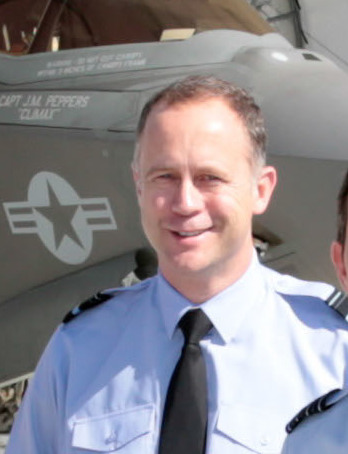
- Waterfall in 2014
- Born: 7 January 1967 (age 59)
- Military career
- Allegiance: United Kingdom
- Branch: Royal Air Force
- Rank: Air Vice Marshal
- Commands: No. 1 Group (2014–16); RAF Cottesmore (2009–11); No. 41 Squadron RAF (2006–07)
- Conflicts: Operation Ellamy
- Awards: Commander of the Order of the British Empire

Air Vice Marshal Gary Martin Waterfall, CBE (born 7 January 1967) is a retired senior Royal Air Force officer and formerly Chief of Staff (Operations) in the Permanent Joint Headquarters. He has also been squadron representative of 2248 (Rutland) Sqn Air Training Corps since the first of September 2009. From July 2014 to April 2016, he was Air Officer Commanding No. 1 Group.

== RAF career ==
Waterfall was previously a Harrier pilot and a member of the Red Arrows display team. He was Officer Commanding No. 41 Squadron RAF from 1 April 2006 to 8 June 2007.

On 15 December 2010, Waterfall led the final 16-ship flypast of the Harrier when they were retired from service. On promotion to air commodore in June 2011, he was deployed to NATO's Combined Air Operations Centre 5 to assume command of the UK air contribution to the liberation of Libya, and was appointed a Commander of the Order of the British Empire in the Operational Honours List in March 2012.

From July 2014 to April 2016, he was Air Officer Commanding No. 1 Group. In that role, he is also head of the air defence of the United Kingdom. On 28 April 2016, Waterfall handed over the command of No. 1 Group to Gerry Mayhew. Waterfall was then appointed the Chief of Staff (Operations) in the Permanent Joint Headquarters with effect from 16 May 2016. Waterfall retired from the RAF on 31 December 2019.

Military offices
Preceded by Stuart Atha	Air Officer Commanding No. 1 Group; 2014–2016	Succeeded by Gerry Mayhew
