= St Benedict's Catholic High School, Alcester =

St Benedict's Catholic High School
- St Benedict's Logo

Location
- Kinwarton Road; Alcester; Warwickshire, B49 6PX; England; 52.2175°N 1.8652°W

Information
- Type: Academy
- Religious affiliation: Roman Catholic
- Established: 1963
- Founder: Sir John Leonard Weston
- Local authority: Warwickshire
- Trust: Our Lady of the Magnificat Multi-Academy Company.
- Department for Education URN: 143634 Tables
- Ofsted: Reports
- Chair: John Howie
- Headteacher: Claire Paddock
- Staff: 34
- Gender: Co-educational
- Age: 11 to 16
- Enrolment: 412as of July 2025
- Language: English
- Houses: Becket, Clitherow, Dibdale, Fisher, More, Easier
- Colour
- Website: Official website

St Benedict's Catholic High School is a co-educational Roman Catholic secondary school and sixth form. It is located in Alcester in the English county of Warwickshire. The school is named after Saint Benedict of Nursia, the patron saint of Europe and students.

Established in 1963, it is an academy school (converted in 2017) overseen by the Roman Catholic Archdiocese of Birmingham and the Catholic Education Service. The catchment area for the school includes Alcester, Bidford-on-Avon, Chipping Campden, Evesham, Redditch, Stratford-upon-Avon and Studley.

St Benedict's Catholic High School offers GCSEs as programmes of study for pupils, while students in the Sixth Form college have the option to study from a range of BTECs and A-Levels.

St Benedict's became an academy in 2017, with the Holy Family Catholic Multi Academy Company. Also in the group are the main feeder schools; Our Lady's Catholic Primary in Alcester, St Mary's Catholic Primary in Henley, St Mary's Catholic Primary in Evesham, St Mary's Catholic Primary in Broadway; and St Gregory's Catholic Primary in Stratford-upon-Avon. The Holy Family Catholic Multi-Academy merged with Our Lady of Lourdes Catholic Multi-Academy in September 2021, forming Our Lady of the Magnificat Multi-Academy Company.

Our Lady of the Magnificat Multi-Academy is a family of 17 schools, spread across Warwickshire and Worcestershire, visit www.magnificat.org.uk for more information.

== Sixth Form ==
The sixth form building, which opened in 2011, is a separate building to the main school with 3 floors. It has its own cinema room, MAC suite and state of the art classrooms including a sound proofed music room.

The Sixth form offers a mixture of A-levels and BTEC level 3 courses, covering a wide range of subjects from English Literature to Criminology. It has just recently entered into a consortium with 2 local schools to provide students with a broader range of enrichment activities and career progressing opportunities.

== Recent inspection results ==
Its most recent inspection, Ofsted rated St. Benedict's 'Required Improvement'. The quality of education, behaviour and attitudes, personal development and leadership and management were all related requires improvement. The sixth form was rated 'good'.

However, the report pays attention to the fact that 'Most pupils at St Benedict's are happy, confident and enjoy school.' The school was last inspected in 2012 and in 2007, in which it was rated outstanding both times. Previous inspections were carried out with different leadership teams and when the school was not an academy. A section 48 inspection report carried out by the Archdiocese of Birmingham in 2018 stated that the school 'Requires Improvements' with regards to its religious aspect. The most recent section 48 inspection carried out in 2022 deemed the school Good and recognised the significant improvements made to the school.

== Notable former pupils ==
- Gerry Mayhew (b. 1969) - senior Royal Air Force officer, Air Marshal
- Andrew Pozzi (b. 1992) - athlete, 2018 indoor World Champion at 60 metres hurdles
