= Gavin Parker =

Royal Air Force officer

Air Vice-Marshal Gavin Parker CB OBE
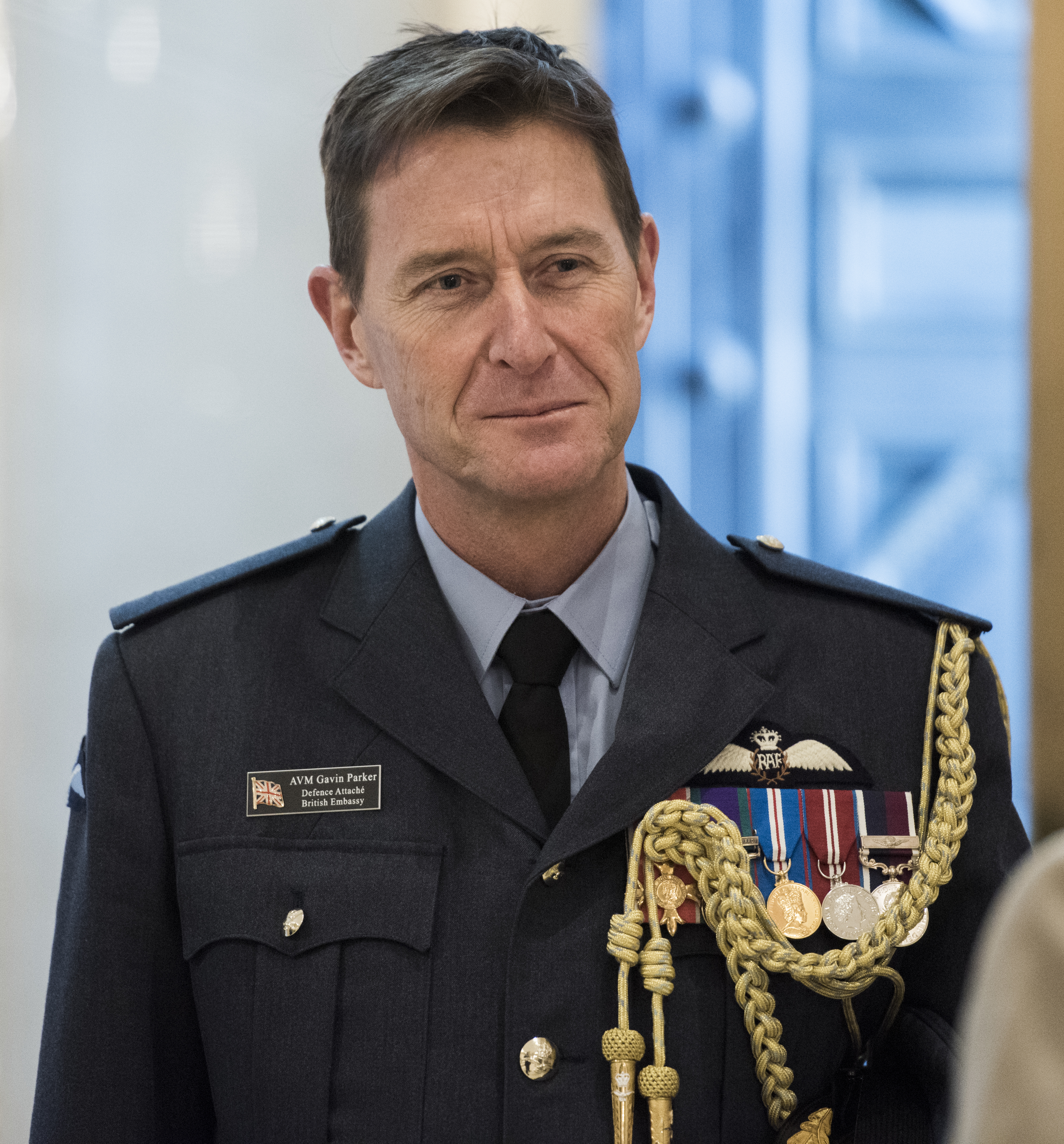
- Air Vice-Marshal Parker in 2018
- Born: 22 February 1969 (age 57); Salisbury, Rhodesia (now Harare, Zimbabwe)
- Military career
- Allegiance: United Kingdom
- Branch: Royal Air Force
- Service years: 1990–2020
- Rank: Air Vice-Marshal
- Commands: No. 2 Group (2015–17); RAF Leuchars (2011–13)
- Conflicts: War in Afghanistan
- Awards: Companion of the Order of the Bath; Officer of the Order of the British Empire

Air Vice-Marshal Gavin Douglas Anthony Parker, CB, OBE is a retired senior Royal Air Force officer and was the Head of the British Defence Staff and Defence Attaché in Washington, D.C.

== Early life and education ==
Parker was born on 22 February 1969 in Salisbury, Rhodesia (now Harare, Zimbabwe). He studied physics at the University of Newcastle upon Tyne in the United Kingdom and graduated with a Bachelor of Science degree in 1990. He later studied at King's College London, graduating with a Master of Arts degree in defence studies in 2006.

== RAF career ==
Parker was commissioned into the Royal Air Force (RAF) on 30 September 1990. He became Air Officer Scotland and station commander at RAF Leuchars in 2011, Assistant Chief of Staff, Plans and Policy at the Ministry of Defence in 2013, and Air Officer Commanding No. 2 Group in 2015. After that he became Head of the British Defence Staff and Defence Attaché in Washington, D.C. in August 2017. Parker was appointed a Companion of the Order of the Bath in the 2019 Birthday Honours, and retired from the RAF on 29 September 2020.

Military offices
Preceded by Harry Atkinson	Station Commander RAF Leuchars; 2011–2013	Succeeded by Gerry Mayhew
Preceded by Harry Atkinson	Air Officer Scotland; 2011–2013	Succeeded by Gerry Mayhew
Preceded by Sean Reynolds	Air Officer Commanding No. 2 Group; 2015–2017	Succeeded by David Cooper
Preceded by Richard Cripwell	Head of the British Defence Staff – US and Defence Attaché; 2017–2020	Succeeded by Michael Smeath
