= David Cooper (RAF officer) =

Air Vice-Marshal David Cooper CBE
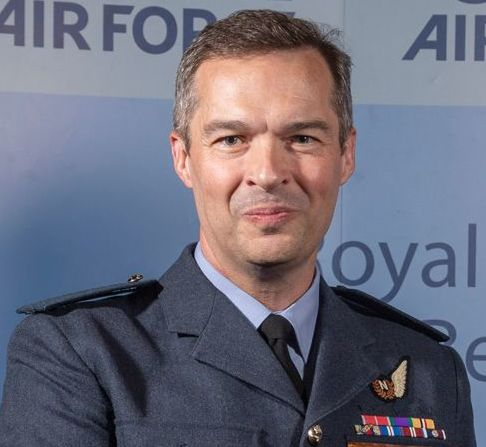
- Air Vice Marshal Cooper in 2019
- Military career
- Allegiance: United Kingdom
- Branch: Royal Air Force
- Service years: 1988–2020
- Rank: Air Vice-Marshal
- Commands: No. 22 Group RAF; RAF Marham; No. 617 Squadron RAF
- Conflicts: Iraq War; War in Afghanistan
- Awards: Commander of the Order of the British Empire; Queen's Commendation for Valuable Service

Air Vice-Marshal David John Edwin Cooper, CBE is a British retired senior Royal Air Force officer.

== RAF career ==
Cooper was commissioned into the Royal Air Force (RAF) on 27 March 1988. He became officer commanding No. 617 Squadron RAF in April 2008. He went on to be Station Commander RAF Marham in November 2011, Director Air Operations for NATO in November 2013 and Joint Force Air Component Commander in Afghanistan in November 2014. He became the Air Officer Commanding No. 2 Group RAF in June 2017. He retired from the RAF on 25 May 2020.

Cooper was awarded the Queen's Commendation for Valuable Service for service on his tour in Afghanistan as Joint Force Air Component Commander. He was appointed a Commander of the Order of the British Empire (CBE) in the 2014 Birthday Honours.

Military offices
Preceded by Gavin Parker	Air Officer Commanding No. 2 Group; 2017–2019	Succeeded by Alan Gillespie
