= Harry Atkinson (RAF officer) =

RAF officer

Richard Atkinson
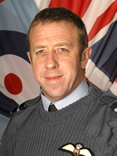
- Air Commodore Harry Atkinson
- Born: Worcester, England
- Military career
- Allegiance: United Kingdom
- Branch: Royal Air Force
- Rank: Air Commodore
- Nickname: Harry
- Commands: Air Officer Scotland (2009–11); RAF Leuchars (2009–11); No. 25 (Fighter) Squadron (2003–05)
- Conflicts: War in Afghanistan
- Awards: Commander of the Order of the British Empire

Air Commodore Richard John Atkinson, CBE (born c. 1964) is a senior Royal Air Force officer and former Air Officer Scotland.

== RAF career ==
Atkinson joined the Royal Air Force in 1982. He was appointed Officer Commanding No. 25 (Fighter) Squadron at RAF Leeming in 2003, Deputy Director, Strategic Planning in the Ministry of Defence in 2005 and was then deployed as Deputy Director, Air Control Element, Headquarters International Security Assistance Force, Kabul in 2008. He became Officer Commanding No 125 Expeditionary Air Wing as well as Air Officer Scotland and Station Commander RAF Leuchars in 2009 and, in that role, led the transformation of RAF Leuchars from being a Tornado base into a Typhoon base before retiring in 2011.

Atkinson was appointed Commander of the Order of the British Empire (CBE) in the 2012 New Year Honours.

After retiring from the RAF, he became Director of Marketing And Communication at the Chartered Institute of Logistics and Transport.

Military offices
Preceded by Clive Bairsto	Station Commander RAF Leuchars; 2009–2011	Succeeded by Gavin Parker
Preceded by Clive Bairsto	Officer Commanding No. 125 Expeditionary Air Wing; 2009–2011	Post disbanded
Preceded by Clive Bairsto	Air Officer Scotland; 2009–2011	Succeeded by Gavin Parker
