= Ross Paterson (RAF officer) =

Royal Air Force reservist

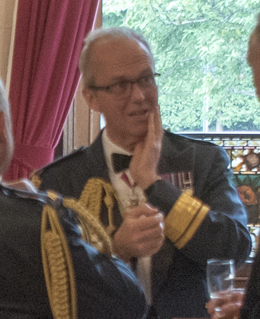
- Paterson in 2017
- Military career
- Allegiance: United Kingdom
- Branch: Royal Air Force
- Rank: Air Vice-Marshal
- Commands: Air Officer Scotland
- Awards: Companion of the Order of the Bath; Officer of the Order of the British Empire

Air Vice Marshal Ross Paterson, CB, OBE, DL is a retired Royal Air Force reservist who served as Air Officer Scotland from January 2015 to December 2023.

== Career ==
After working in the Prime Minister's Strategy Unit, Paterson became Head of Strategy and Personnel Policy for the Royal Air Force (RAF) in May 2009, Chief Executive of the Service Personnel and Veterans Agency in October 2011, and Chief Executive of the Scottish Public Pensions Agency in May 2015.

=== RAF service ===
On 31 July 1983, Paterson was commissioned in the Administrative Branch of the Royal Air Force as a flying officer and was granted seniority in that rank from 31 January 1982. He was promoted to flight lieutenant on 31 January 1986. By June 2001, he had been promoted to the rank of group captain.

He became Air Officer Scotland in January 2015. He was succeeded in that role by Air Commodore Bill Gibson in January 2024.

== Honours ==
In the 2001 Queen's Birthday Honours, Paterson was appointed an Officer of the Order of the British Empire (OBE).

Paterson was awarded the St Andrews University Medal during a graduation ceremony in June 2024.

Military offices
Preceded by Gerry Mayhew	Air Officer Scotland; 2015–2024	Succeeded by Bill Gibson
