= Clive Bairsto =

British RAF officer

Clive A Bairsto
- Military career
- Allegiance: United Kingdom
- Branch: Royal Air Force
- Rank: Air vice-marshal
- Commands: RAF Leuchars; No. 83 Expeditionary Air Group; RAF Akrotiri
- Awards: Commander of the Order of the British Empire

Air Vice Marshal Clive Arthur Bairsto CBE is a former Royal Air Force officer and former Air Officer Scotland.

== RAF career ==
Bairsto became Station Commander RAF Akrotiri and Commander of the Western Sovereign Base Area, Cyprus in 2005, Air Officer Commanding No. 83 Expeditionary Air Group at Al Udeid Air Base, Qatar in 2006 and Officer Commanding No. 125 Expeditionary Air Wing as well as Air Officer Scotland and Station Commander, RAF Leuchars in 2007. He went on to be Head of International Policy and Planning (Military) at the Ministry of Defence in 2009 before retiring in 2013. Bairsto was appointed a Commander of the Order of the British Empire in the 2010 New Year Honours.

After retiring from the RAF, became Global Head of Business, Resilience at National Grid plc and then Chief Executive of Street Works UK, a cross-sector trade association.

Military offices
Preceded by Barry North	Air Officer Commanding No. 83 Expeditionary Air Group; 2006–2007	Succeeded by Michael Harwood
Preceded by Julian Stinton	Station Commander RAF Leuchars; 2007–2009	Succeeded by Harry Atkinson
Preceded by Julian Stinton	Officer Commanding No. 125 Expeditionary Air Wing; 2007–2009	Succeeded by Harry Atkinson
Preceded by Julian Stinton	Air Officer Scotland; 2007–2009	Succeeded by Harry Atkinson
