= Nick Perry (British Army officer) =

British Army officer (born 1972)

General Nick Perry DSO MBE
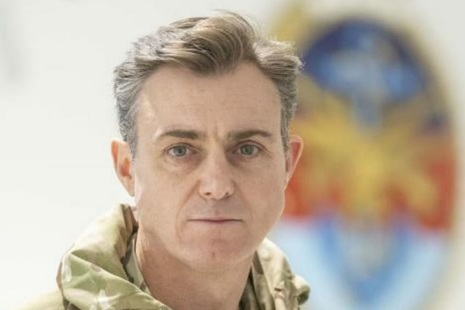
- Perry in 2024
- Born: 1971 or 1972 (age 54–55)
- Military career
- Allegiance: United Kingdom
- Branch: British Army
- Service years: 1992–present
- Rank: General
- Commands: 16 Air Assault Brigade
- Conflicts: War in Afghanistan
- Awards: Companion of the Distinguished Service Order; Member of the Order of the British Empire

General Nicholas Charles Laybourne Perry, DSO, MBE (born 1972) is a British Army officer who has been Commander of Joint Force Command (JFC) Norfolk since September 2026. He was Chief of Joint Operations from November 2024 to July 2026, and before that served as Assistant Chief of the General Staff between 2021 and 2022, and then as Director Special Forces.

== Early life and education ==
Perry was born in 1972, the son of Richard Laybourne Perry and his wife Susan Margaret Cave-Browne. He was educated at Ampleforth College, then an all-boys Catholic boarding school.

== Military career ==
On 12 September 1992, Perry was commissioned into the Royal Hussars, British Army, as a second lieutenant (on probation) as part of being sponsored through university on an undergraduate cadetship. After completing his degree and further training at the Royal Military Academy Sandhurst, his commission in the King's Royal Hussars was confirmed on 10 September 1995 with seniority in the rank of second lieutenant from 7 February 1993. He was also promoted to lieutenant on 10 September 1995 with seniority in that rank from 7 February 1995. He was promoted to captain on 10 February 1999.

He served as Chief of Staff for Task Force Helmand in winter 2010, and was then made commander of 22 SAS Regiment in 2012. He became military advisor to the Prime Minister in 2015. He went on to be commander of 16 Air Assault Brigade in 2017, Assistant Chief of the General Staff in March 2021 and Director Special Forces in 2022. He was promoted to lieutenant general on 15 November 2024, as he was appointed Chief of Joint Operations at Permanent Joint Headquarters.

In July 2026, it was announced that Perry would be the next Commander Joint Force Command Norfolk (JFC Norfolk), taking up the appointment in September 2026, with the promotion to substantive general on 25 September 2026. He will be the first British officer to head JFC Norfolk, which is responsible for Nato operations across the Atlantic, the UK, the High North and northern Europe.

Perry was appointed a Companion of the Distinguished Service Order for his service in Afghanistan in 2008, and a Member of the Order of the British Empire (MBE) for his service in Afghanistan in 2010.

Military offices
Preceded by Ralph Wooddisse	Assistant Chief of the General Staff; 2021–2022	Succeeded by Charles Collins
Preceded by Gwyn Jenkins	Director Special Forces; 2022–2024	Succeeded by Unknown
Preceded by Sir Charles Stickland	Chief of Joint Operations; 2024–2026	Succeeded by Allan Marshall
