= Greg Bagwell =

Royal Air Force Air Marshal (born 1961)

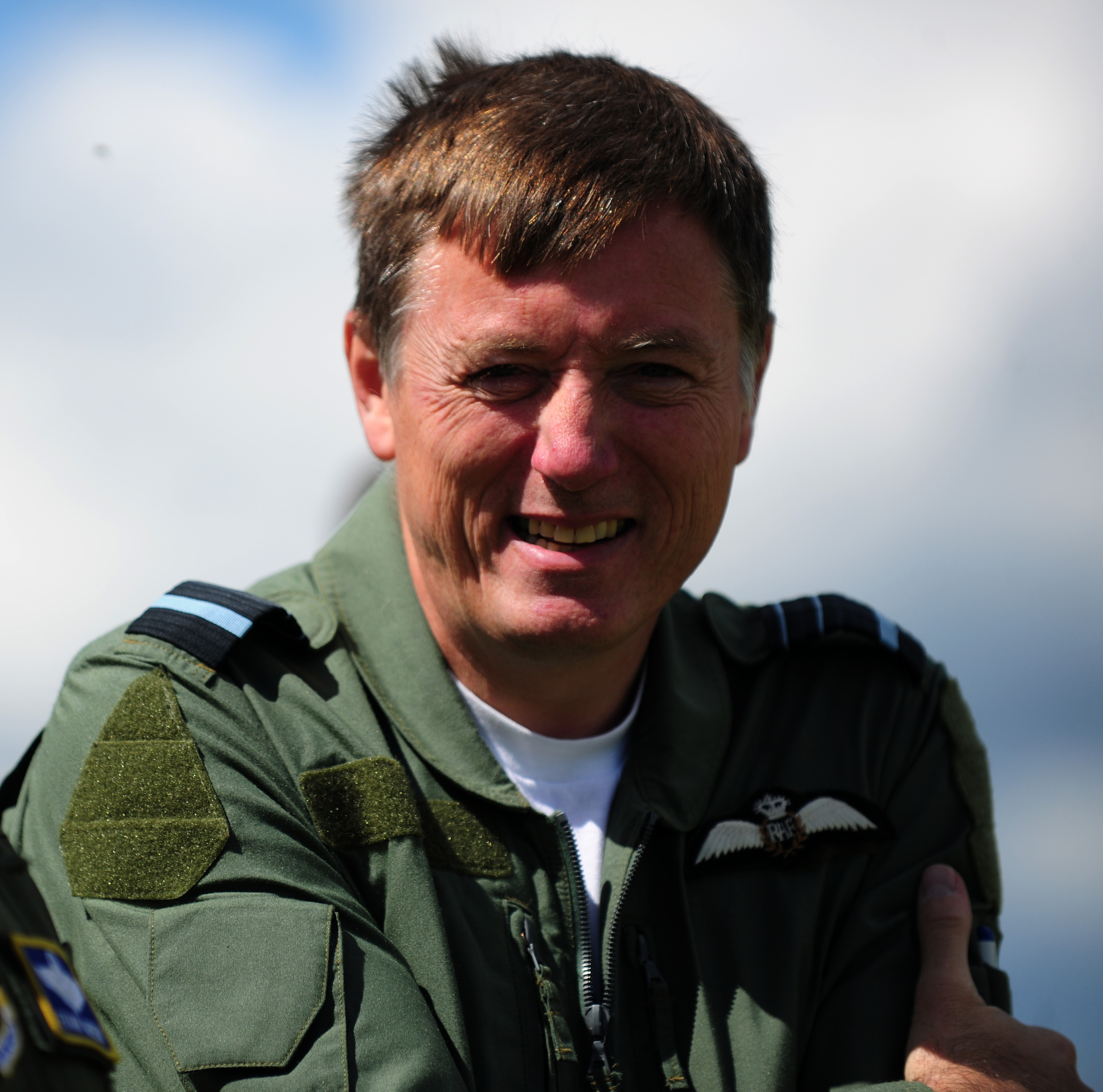
- Bagwell in 2014
- Born: 6 October 1961 (age 65); Dartford, Kent, England
- Military career
- Allegiance: United Kingdom
- Branch: Royal Air Force
- Service years: 1981–2016
- Rank: Air Marshal
- Commands: No. 1 Group; RAF Marham; No. 9 Squadron
- Conflicts: Gulf War; Operation Ellamy
- Awards: Companion of the Order of the Bath; Commander of the Order of the British Empire

Air Marshal Gregory Jack Bagwell, CB, CBE (born 6 October 1961) is a retired senior Royal Air Force (RAF) commander who served as Deputy Commander (Operations) at RAF Air Command.

== RAF career ==
Entering the RAF as an aircraftman, Bagwell was commissioned an acting pilot officer on 24 July 1981, with the service number 8027917 into the General Duties (Flying) Branch. He was regraded to pilot officer the following 24 July, with the service number 8027917R. He was promoted to flying officer on 24 July 1983 and to flight lieutenant on 24 January 1987. He qualified as a Tornado Pilot, with his 1st operational tour with No. 31 'Goldstars' Squadron, later specialising as a qualified weapons instructor.

Bagwell was promoted to squadron leader on 1 July 1991. He was promoted to wing commander on 1 January 1997 and became commanding Officer of No. 9 Squadron, serving in operations over Iraq and Kosovo. Promoted to group captain on 1 July 2001, he went on to be Coalition Air Operations Chief at the Al Udeid Coalition Air Operations Centre in 2004 and then Station Commander of RAF Marham later that year.

Achieving air officer rank on 1 July 2006 with a promotion to air commodore, Bagwell served as Assistant Chief of Staff, Crisis & Deliberate Planning at Permanent Joint Headquarters. Appointed a Commander of the Order of the British Empire in the 2007 Birthday Honours, Bagwell became Air Officer Commanding No. 1 Group in 2009 in the rank of air vice - marshal, in which capacity he was deployed as the UK's Joint Force Air Component Commander for operations over Libya (Operation Ellamy). On 23 March 2011, Bagwell was quoted by the BBC saying that the Libyan People's Air Force "no longer exists as a fighting force" and that Libyan air defences had been damaged to the extent that NATO forces could now operate over Libyan airspace "with impunity."

Bagwell became Chief of Staff Joint Warfare Development at Permanent Joint Headquarters and then Director Joint Warfare at Joint Forces Command in 2011. He was made a Companion of the Order of the Bath in the 2012 Birthday Honours. He was then appointed Deputy Commander (Operations) at RAF Air Command on 16 April 2013, with the rank of air marshal.

Military offices
Preceded by Chris Harper	Air Officer Commanding No. 1 Group; 2009–2011	Succeeded by Stuart Atha
Preceded by Richard Garwood	Deputy Commander-in-Chief (Operations) RAF Air Command; 2013–2016	Succeeded by Stuart Atha
