= RAF Leuchars =

Former Royal Air Force station in Fife, Scotland

RAF Leuchars
- Leuchars, Fife in Scotland
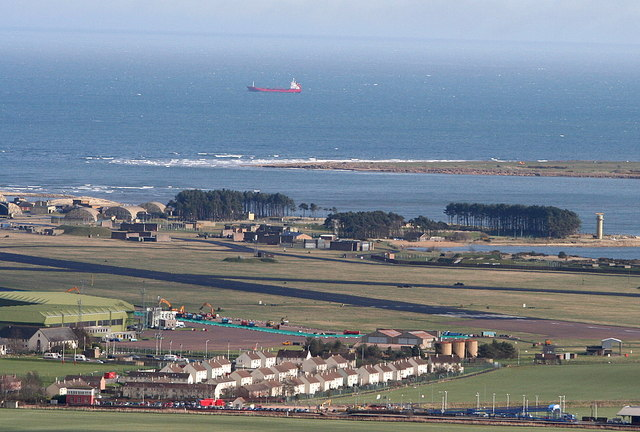
- Aerial view looking east over Leuchars.

- Attack and Protect

Site information
- Type: Royal Air Force station
- Owner: Ministry of Defence
- Operator: Royal Air Force
- Controlled by: RAF Fighter Command
- Condition: Closed

Location
- Location within Fife RAF Leuchars (the United Kingdom)
- Coordinates: 56°22′23″N 002°52′07″W
- Grid reference: NO460205
- Area: 357 hectares

Site history
- Built: 1920
- In use: 1920–2015
- Fate: Transferred to the British Army to become Leuchars Station.; Airfield maintained as a Relief Landing Ground.

Airfield information
- Identifiers: IATA: ADX, ICAO: EGQL, WMO: 03171
- Elevation: 12 metres (39 ft) AMSL
Runways
Direction	Length and surface
09/27	2,589 metres (8,494 ft) Asphalt
04/22	747 metres (2,451 ft) Asphalt

Royal Air Force Leuchars or more simply RAF Leuchars (IATA: ADX, ICAO: EGQL) is a former Royal Air Force station located in Leuchars, Fife, on the east coast of Scotland. Throughout the Cold War and beyond, the station was home to fighter aircraft which policed northern UK airspace. The station ceased to be an RAF station at 12:00 hrs on 31 March 2015 when it became Leuchars Station and control of the site was transferred to the British Army. The RAF temporarily returned to Leuchars between August and October 2020 to carry out QRA (I) responsibilities while runway works were being carried out at RAF Lossiemouth.

== History ==
=== First World War ===
Aviation at Leuchars dates back to 1911 with a balloon squadron of the Royal Engineers setting up a training camp in Tentsmuir Forest. They were soon joined in the skies by the 'string and sealing wax' aircraft of the embryonic Royal Flying Corps; such aircraft favoured the sands of St Andrews, where not the least of the attractions was the availability of fuel from local garages. Like so many RAF stations, the airfield itself owes its existence to the stimulus of war, and work began on levelling the existing site on Reres Farm in 1916. From the beginning, Leuchars was intended as a training unit, being termed a 'Temporary Mobilisation Station' taking aircrew from initial flying training through to fleet co-operation work. Building was still under way when the Armistice was signed in 1918. Much was made of Leuchars' maritime location when it was designated a Naval Fleet Training School, eventually to undertake the training of 'naval spotting' crews who acted as eyes for the Royal Navy's capital ships.

=== Inter-war years ===
The unit was formally named 'Royal Air Force Leuchars' on 16 March 1920, but nevertheless retained its strong naval links. As the Navy embraced the value of aviation, the aircraft carrier was added to its inventory. Many of the flights dedicated to Leuchars were detached to such vessels for months at a time, with light and dark blue uniforms apparently mixing happily together. At St Andrews, the citizens were not unaware of the potential uses of aviation and attempts were made to use aircraft as a means of transport for golfing enthusiasts. More successful were the barn-storming displays of the flying circuses which were extremely popular in the town. In 1935, Leuchars became home to No. 1 Flying Training School (1 FTS) and ranges for practice bombing were established in Tentsmuir Forest. As the war clouds gathered, its maritime position ensured that Leuchars would come to play a more warlike role. 1 FTS moved to RAF Netheravon and the station came under the control of RAF Coastal Command. With the arrival of No. 224 and No. 233 (General Reconnaissance) Squadrons in August 1938, both of which were equipped with Avro Ansons at the time, the station had an operational, rather than training, role for the first time.

=== Second World War ===
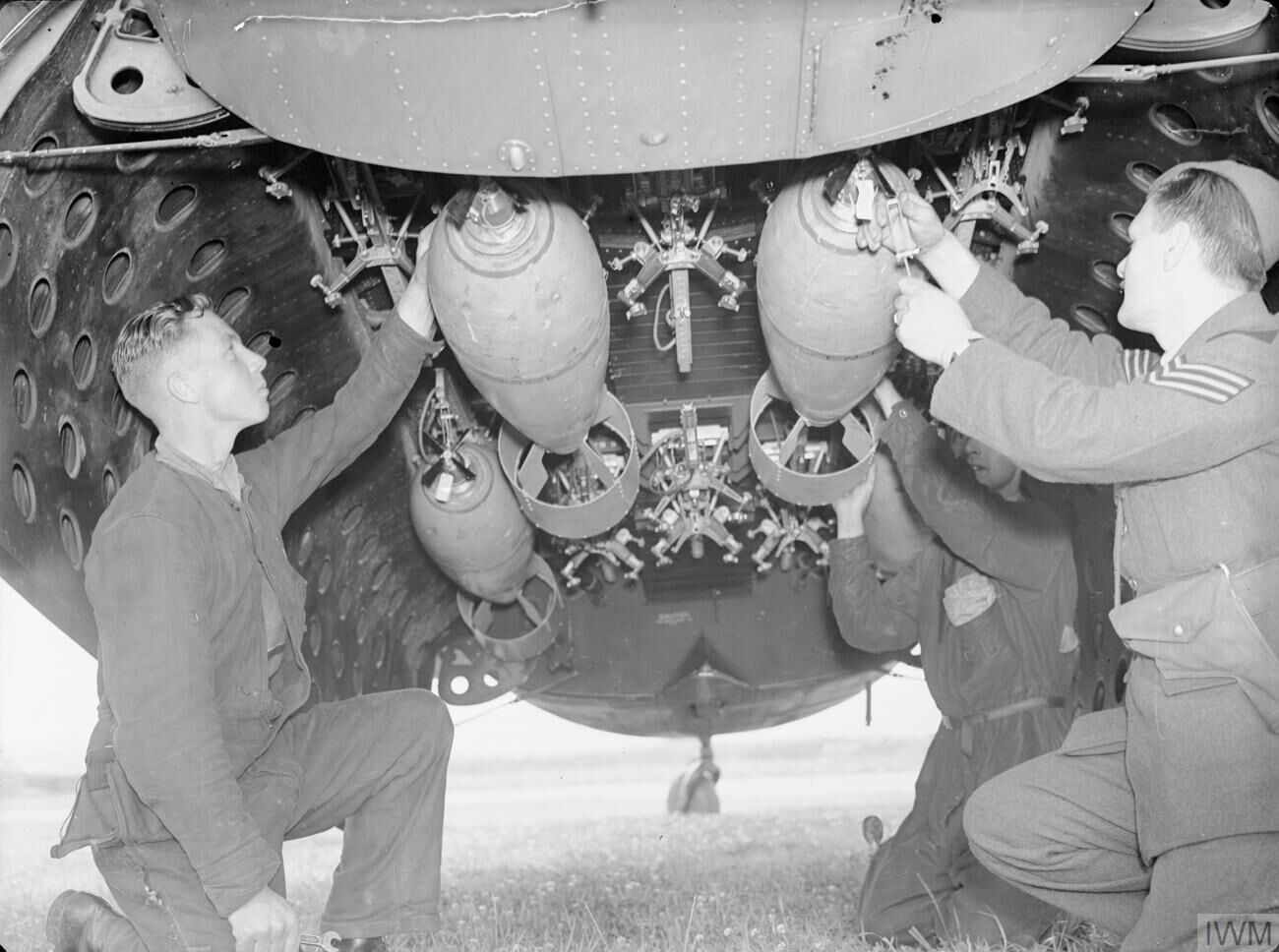
Armourers secure 250lb bombs in the bomb-bay of a Lockheed Hudson of No. 224 Squadron at Leuchars.

On 4 September 1939, a Lockheed Hudson of No. 224 Squadron attacked a Dornier Do 18 over the North Sea with inconclusive results but became the first British aircraft to engage the enemy in the Second World War. Leuchars was not to secure the romantic image of a Battle of Britain station, but rather settled to the routine of hour upon hour of maritime patrol which played a crucial part in Britain's ultimate victory. In February 1940, another No. 224 Squadron Hudson located the German prison ship the Altmark which allowed for its interception by HMS Cossack and the liberation of over 200 British prisoners. On 2 December 1943, a pigeon called Winkie became one of the first birds or animals to be awarded the Dickin Medal for helping rescue the crew of a ditched bomber from the station. During the Second World War, British Overseas Airways Corporation formed in November 1939 from Imperial Airways, and British Airways Ltd operated a wartime route from RAF Leuchars to Stockholm. From 1943 BOAC used civilian-registered de Havilland Mosquito aircraft. Noted for the carrying of ball-bearings from Sweden to the UK, the route also returned RAF aircrew who had diverted to or made crash-landings in Swedish airfields during operations over Europe. Other aircraft types were used. No. 3 Armament Training Camp RAF was here between November 1941 and 1 September 1945.

=== Cold War ===
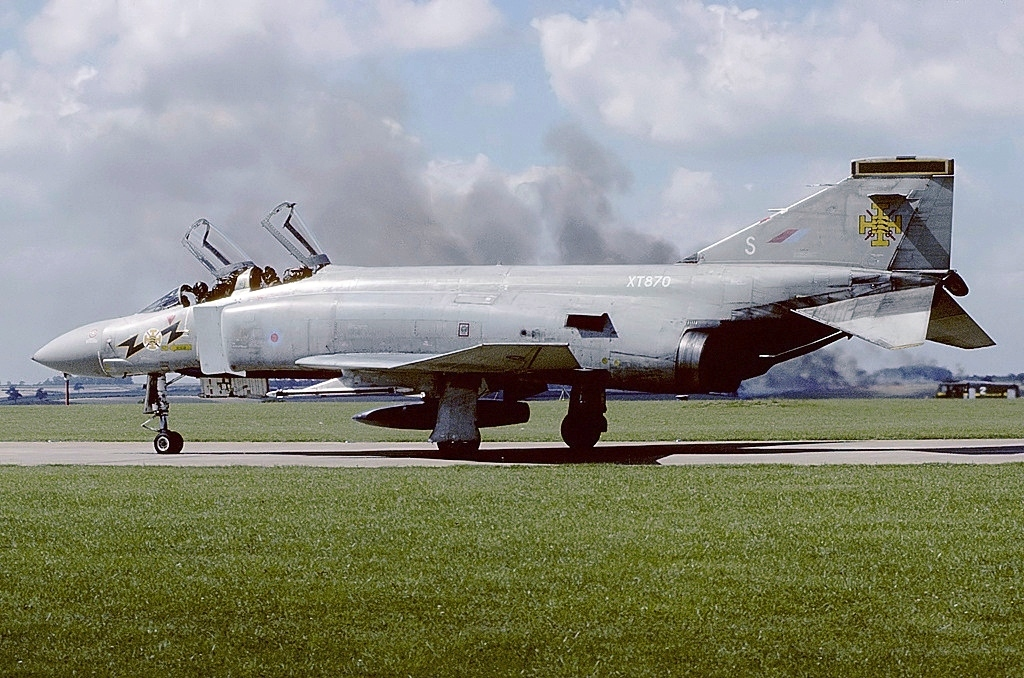
A No. 111 Squadron McDonnell Douglas F-4K Phantom FG.1, an aircraft closely associated with RAF Leuchars.

Leuchars remained an active station to the end of the war, concentrating on anti-submarine and anti-shipping strikes. With the contraction of the RAF in peacetime, life at Leuchars returned to a more gentle pace, hosting a school for general reconnaissance and the St Andrews University Air Squadron complete with de Havilland Tiger Moth. In May 1950 Leuchars entered the jet age as it passed from Coastal to RAF Fighter Command and Gloster Meteors of No. 222 Squadron made the station their new home. 1950 also saw No. 43 Squadron arrive at Leuchars from RAF Tangmere with their Meteors, the start of a long-lasting association between the base and the 'Fighting Cocks'. In July 1954, No. 43 Squadron converted to the new Hawker Hunter F.1 becoming the first squadron in the entire Royal Air Force to operate the type. No. 43 Squadron upgraded to Hunter FGA.9s in 1960 and were shortly relocated away to Cyprus the following year. No. 23 Squadron arrived in March 1963, equipped with all-weather Gloster Javelin FAW.9s. Leuchars' air-sea rescue services upgraded to Westland Whirlwind helicopters in 1964. The University Air Squadron was equipped with the de Havilland Chipmunk.

As the Cold War reached its frostiest depths in the 1960s, the development of long-range aircraft allowed the Soviets regular incursion into British air space. Initially this was countered by the use of the English Electric Lightning, with No. 23 Squadron taking delivery of Lightning F.3s in 1964 to be used in the interceptor role. This was shortly followed by No. 74 Squadron relocating to Leuchars from RAF Coltishall in the same year, also being equipped with Lightning F.3s. No. 11 Squadron became the next Lightning squadron to be based at Leuchars when it reformed in April 1967 and replaced No. 74 Squadron who moved to RAF Tengah in Singapore. Leuchars' position made it ideally suited as a base to ensure the integrity of British air space and thus on 1 September 1969, Leuchars' air defence capability was increased with the delivery of McDonnell Douglas F-4K Phantom FG.1s to the newly reformed No. 43 Squadron – a squadron that would become synonymous with the base over the next 40 years. From 1972 to 1978 Leuchars also served as the home for 892 Naval Air Squadron's Phantom FG.1s when they were disembarked from their carrier HMS Ark Royal. In March 1972, No. 11 Squadron moved south to RAF Binbrook, leaving No. 23 Squadron as the sole Lightning fleet at the base. October 1975 saw the last Lightnings leave Leuchars when No. 23 Squadron converted to Phantom FGR.2s from their Lightning F.6s and moved to RAF Coningsby. A month later No. 111 Squadron relocated north from Coningsby up to Leuchars and were equipped with Phantom FGR.2s. December 1978 saw the withdrawal of HMS Ark Royal which led to her fleet of Phantom FG.1s being distributed to 'Treble One', who in turn saw their Phantom FGR.2 airframes sent elsewhere across the RAF. For over two decades Leuchars' aircraft policed the UK air defence region, demonstrating the ability to intercept unidentified aircraft and provide an effective deterrent. During May 1987, 228 OCU (Operational conversion unit) moved from RAF Coningsby to Leuchars. The OCU operated the Phantom FGR2 and had the Shadow identity of 64(R) Squadron.

For the majority of the Cold War period from 1954 to the early 1990s, RAF Search and Rescue (SARF) had an enduring presence at Leuchars in the form of a detached flight of helicopters from No. 22 Squadron. The flight was initially equipped with the Bristol Sycamore until their replacement by the Whirlwind HAR.10 in 1955 which in turn were superseded in 1976 by the Westland Wessex HAR.2. Besides assisting Leuchars' own Royal Air Force Mountain Rescue Service unit, the flight also proved a valuable adjunct to civilian mountain and maritime rescue services. There were also two rescue launches based in Tayport for a time.

During the 1980s, RAF Leuchars was home to No. 27 Squadron RAF Regiment which was a Short Range Air Defence (SHORAD) based squadron, using Field Standard A Rapier Missile system.

=== Post-Cold War ===
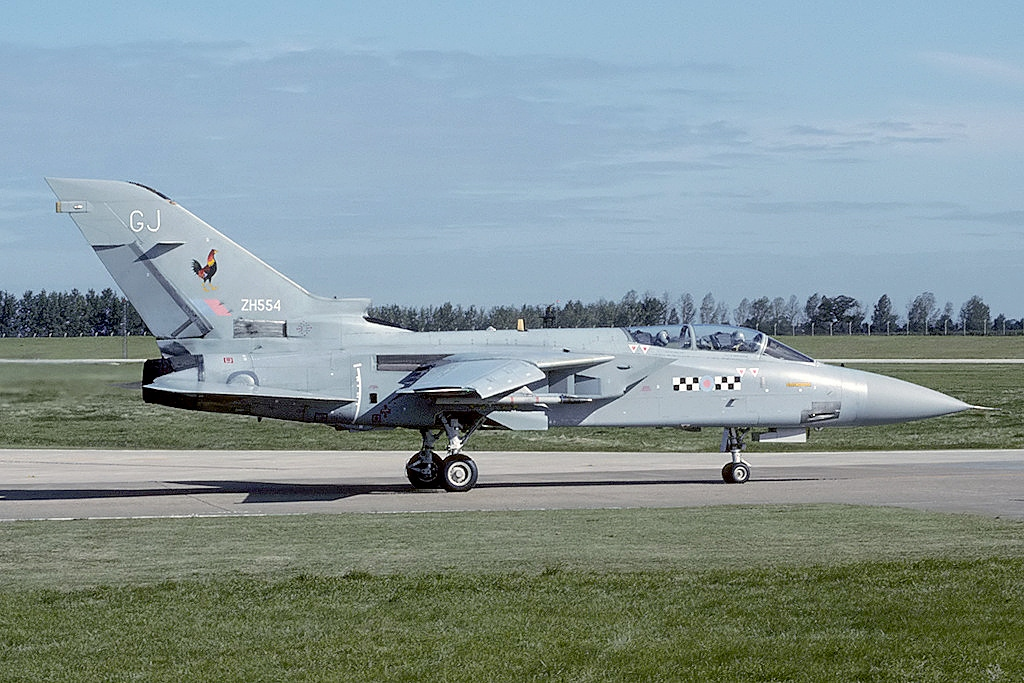
Panavia Tornado F.3 of No. 43 Squadron, seen in 1993.

The Phantoms of No. 43 Squadron and No. 111 Squadron were replaced by Panavia Tornado F.3s during 1989 - 1991, with the last leaving during May 1991. April 2003 saw the Tornado F.3 Operational Conversion Unit (OCU), No. 56 (Reserve) Squadron, move to RAF Leuchars. In April 2008, No. 56 (R) Squadron amalgamated with No. 43 Squadron, retaining the identity of the latter until it was disbanded in July 2009. In September 2010, No. 6 Squadron was the first squadron at RAF Leuchars to be reformed operating the Eurofighter Typhoon; Typhoons from the squadron performed a Quick Reaction Alert (QRA) scramble on Sunday 2 January 2011. 6 Squadron took over QRA duties when the last of the Tornado F.3s were retired. The second Typhoon squadron, No. 1 (Fighter) Squadron, was reformed at the 2012 RAF Leuchars Airshow on 15 September 2012. Leuchars had a long history of defending sovereign UK airspace over many decades stretching back to Meteor aircraft and finally with the Typhoon. Aircraft such as the English Electric Lightning and McDonnell Douglas Phantom were prevalent over many years. Leuchars was home to the last squadron of Tornado F.3s, No. 111 Squadron. No. 111 Squadron operated the QRA which was set up primarily to combat threats from Soviet attacks during the Cold War. The unit was disbanded in March 2011.

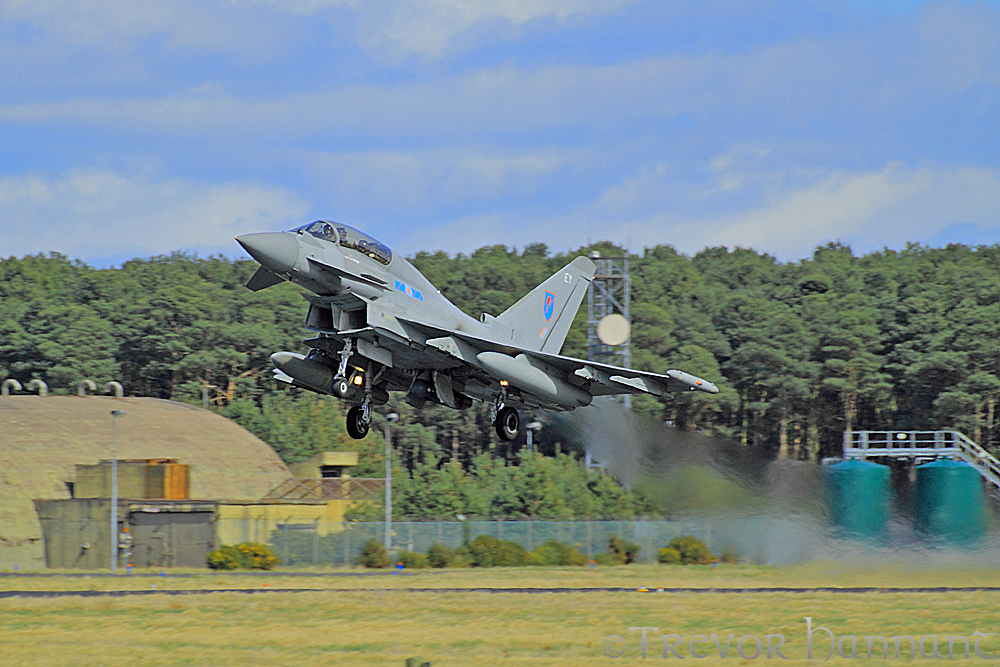
A No. 6 Squadron Eurofighter Typhoon T.3 taking off from Leuchars in 2013.

The station was formerly home to No. 125 Expeditionary Air Wing, but it is still the home of the East of Scotland Universities Air Squadron (ESUAS) and No. 12 Air Experience Flight RAF (12 AEF), who both use a fleet of seven Grob Tutor T.1's. No. 125 Expeditionary Air Wing (EAW) was formed at Leuchars on 1 April 2006. The wing encompasses most of the non-formed unit personnel and does not include the flying units based at the station. The station commander was dual-hatted as the commander of the wing. Leuchars is also the base for No. 612 (County of Aberdeen) Squadron, Royal Auxiliary Air Force (an air-transportable surgical squadron), and was formerly a host to an RAF Mountain rescue Unit. Leuchars frequently hosts local Air Training Corps units. Until 1 January 2015 it was also the parent station to several remote units in the central Scotland area, including Universities of Glasgow and Strathclyde Air Squadron, 602 Squadron Royal Auxiliary Air Force, 603 Squadron Royal Auxiliary Air Force and many Air Training Corps squadrons. RAF Lossiemouth in Moray, and RAF Coningsby in Lincolnshire, are now the sole operating bases and custodians for QRA(I) North & South respectively, flying the Typhoon FGR.4. A third Tornado F.3 Squadron, No. 56 (R) Squadron, was disbanded in April 2008 in preparation for the arrival of the Eurofighter Typhoon, in 2010. Members of No. 56 (R) Squadron had temporarily joined No. 43 Squadron until it too was disbanded in July 2009. Following the departure of the two Typhoon Squadrons, No. 6 Squadron in June 2014, and No. 1 (F) Squadron in September 2014, RAF Leuchars merged the traditional Tri-Wing structure of Base, Engineering and Logistics and Operations Wings into a single Wing structure. RAF ownership of the site ceased on 31 March 2015 when it was handed over to the British Army, thus ending 95 years of service as a Royal Air Force station.

== Station commanders ==
- April 1922 Charles Burnett
- 17 October 1928 Wilfrid Freeman
- September 1938 Group Captain Brian Edmund Baker
- 1953 Gp Capt N A N Bray (killed in a flying accident 8 Jul 1953)
- Jul 1955 Gp Capt P G St G O'Brian
- Apr 1956 Gp Capt D F Beardon
- 16 December 1959 Group Captain Eric Plumtree
- 2 October 1961 Group Captain A.N.Davis
- 21 January 1963 Group Captain Paddy Harbison
- 14 August 1965 Group Captain Arthur Strudwick, from Woking, attended Kingfield Central School, flew with 602 Sqn, then a prisoner of war
- 9 June 1967 Group Captain John Nicholls
- 23 January 1970 Group Captain Neville Howlett
- 28 January 1972 Michael Swiney, known for his Little Rissington UFO incident in October 1952
- 21 September 1973 Group Captain Alan White
- 1975 Group Captain Robert Davis
- 20 May 1977 Group Captain Bill Maish
- 22 August 1981 Group Captain Michael Graydon
- July 1983 Group Captain Tim Elworthy
- 5 July 1985 Group Captain Ian Macfadyen
- 20 November 1987 Group Captain Tony Bagnall
- 1 December 1989 Group Captain Lloyd Doble, awarded the OBE in the 1990 New Year Honours
- 20 December 1991 Group Captain Steve Nicholl, son of a former BOAC pilot
- 14 January 1994 Group Captain Nigel Sudborough, from Northampton, attended Oundle School, awarded the OBE in the 1989 New Year Honours, his father Alex took part in D-Day
- 28 December 1995 Air Commodore Jack Haines
- 2004 Air Commodore Simon Bryant
- 2007 Clive Bairsto
- 2009 Harry Atkinson
- 2011 Gavin Parker
- 2013 Gerry Mayhew

== Incidents ==
On 15 August 1993 a KLM 737 Flight 110, from Tunis to Amsterdam, was hijacked by an Egyptian, 40 year old Khaled Abdel Mounien Gharib, and followed by a Tornado from Leuchars; the Egyptian had been deported from the Netherlands the previous year, for arson; the hijacker was discovered to be unarmed, and had no explosives, but the aircraft was stormed by the German GSG 9.

== Closure ==
=== RAF drawdown ===
On 18 July 2011, Defence Secretary Liam Fox announced that RAF Leuchars would close as part of the Strategic Defence and Security Review 2010, with the station being transferred to British Army control in 2015 and Leuchars's Typhoons moving to RAF Lossiemouth in Morayshire.

In preparation for the closure, RAF Leuchars Mountain Rescue Team disbanded in Nov 2013 whilst No. 58 Squadron of the RAF Regiment and No. 6 Force Protection Wing disbanded on 10 May 2014. No. 6 Squadron was the first Typhoon unit to depart Leuchars, heading for its new home at RAF Lossiemouth in June 2014. No. 1 Squadron followed on 8 September 2014, at which point responsibility for Quick Reaction Alert (North) was transferred from Leuchars to Lossiemouth.

=== Transfer to British Army ===
Control of Leuchars was transferred to the British Army on 31 March 2015, when it was renamed Leuchars Station. The Royal Scots Dragoon Guards gradually relocated from Germany in the spring and summer of 2015 along with 2 Close Support Battalion of the Royal Electrical and Mechanical Engineers and 110 Provost Company, Royal Military Police.

The airfield is maintained as a diversion airfield for aircraft based at RAF Lossiemouth and other aircraft. The station continues to be home to several RAF units, including No. 612 (County of Aberdeen) Squadron RAuxAF, the East of Scotland Universities Air Squadron incorporating No. 12 Air Experience Flight, and the headquarters of Scotland and Northern Ireland Region and South East Scotland Wing of the Air Training Corps.

=== Flying at Leuchars Station ===
In September 2018, it was announced that due to the refurbishment of RAF Lossiemouth's runway, QRA North responsibilities would be moved to Leuchars for up to six weeks in the summer of 2019. However, these works did not occur until 2020 with Typhoon FGR4s arriving back at Leuchars on 10 August 2020 where they remained for the next two months before returning to Lossiemouth.

In late October 2020, it was confirmed by the Ministry of Defence that they were looking into increasing both civilian and military usage of the airfield at Leuchars with the reinstallation of F34 fuel facilities; however, there would be no aircraft based permanently.

== International Airshow ==
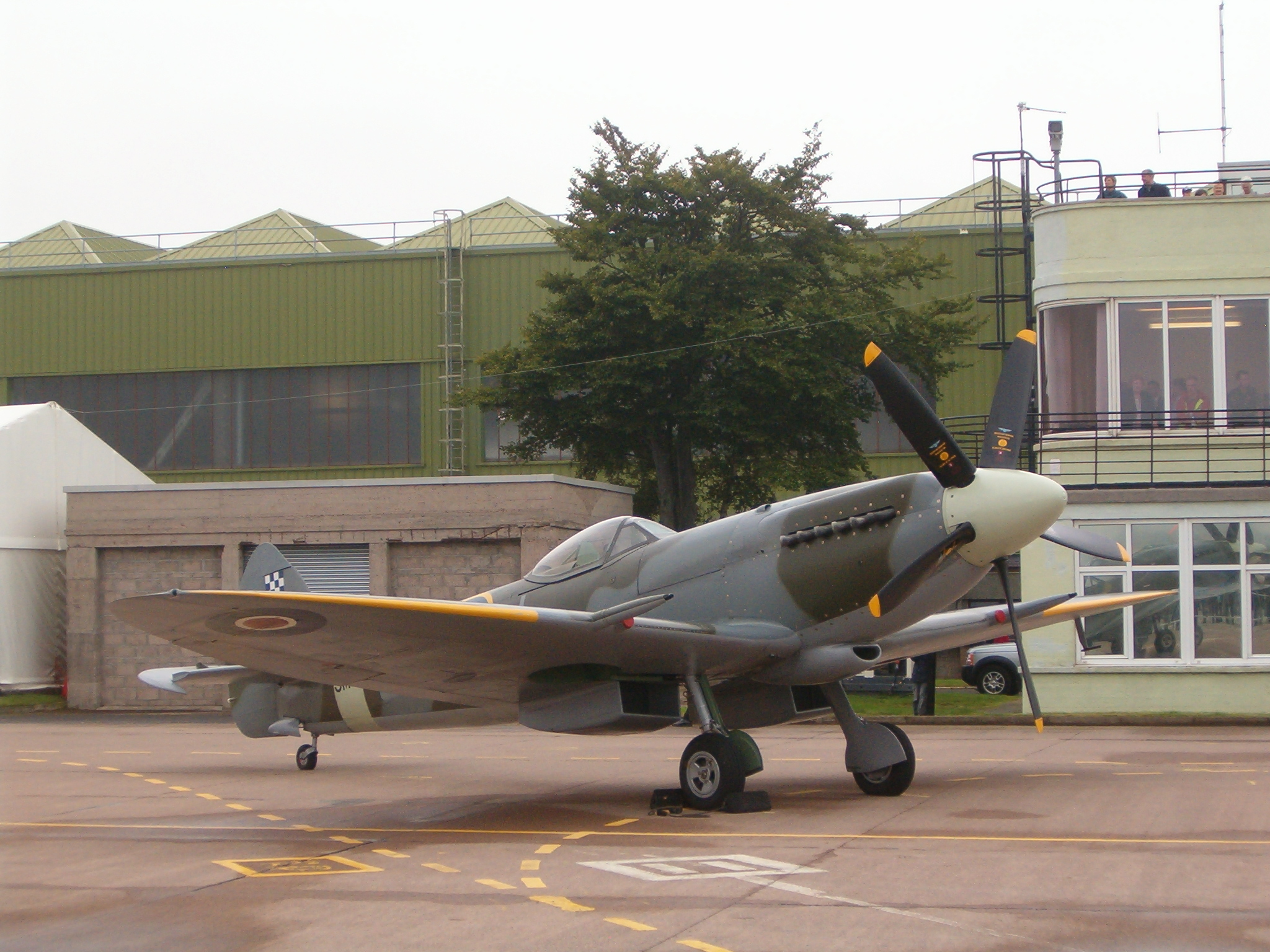
Supermarine Spitfire FR Mk.XVIIIe SM845 RAF Leuchars Airshow, 2008

RAF Leuchars was home to the annual Leuchars Airshow which originated many decades before when the Battle of Britain At Home shows were established around the UK to mark the events of 1940. This usually took place on a Saturday in September. The 2007 Leuchars Airshow was cancelled due to resurfacing of the runway. Approximately 45,000 people attended the 2010 show to see displays including the Red Arrows, Eurofighter Typhoon, and Battle of Britain Memorial Flight. Air forces from many NATO countries provided additional static and flight displays. The final airshow was held on 8 September 2013 and circa 45,000 people were on site.

== See also ==
- List of former Royal Air Force stations
