= McDonnell Douglas Phantom in UK service =

British combat aircraft

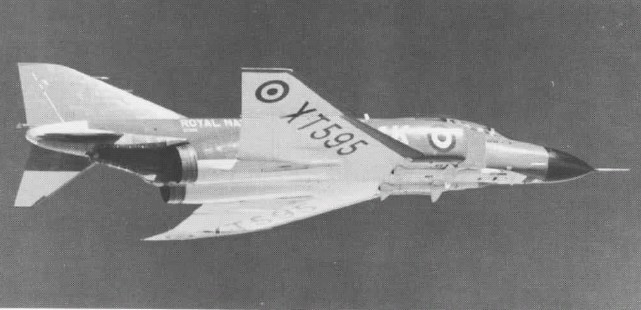
The first British Phantom (XT595) during a test flight in 1968

The McDonnell Douglas F-4 Phantom II was one of the principal combat aircraft of the United Kingdom (UK) from 1968 to 1992. The UK was the first export customer for the US-built F-4 Phantom, which was ordered amid political and economic difficulties that afflicted British designs for similar aircraft. The Phantom was procured to fill several roles with the Royal Navy's Fleet Air Arm and the Royal Air Force (RAF), including air defence, close air support, low-level attack and tactical reconnaissance.

Most Phantoms operated by the UK were built as a special batch containing British technology, an effort to support the British aerospace industry after major project cancellations. Two variants were initially built for the UK: the F-4K variant, designed from the outset as an air-defence interceptor to be operated by the Fleet Air Arm from the Royal Navy's aircraft carriers; and the F-4M version, operated by the RAF in tactical strike and reconnaissance roles. In the mid-1980s, a third Phantom variant was obtained when 15 second-hand F-4J aircraft were purchased to augment the UK's air defences after the Falklands War.

The Phantom entered service with the Fleet Air Arm and the RAF in 1969. In Fleet Air Arm service, it was primarily intended for fleet air defence, with secondary conventional and nuclear strike roles; in the RAF it was soon replaced in its initial tasks by other aircraft designed specifically for strike, close air support and reconnaissance, and was moved to the air-defence mission. By the mid-1970s, the Phantom had become the UK's principal interceptor; it continued in this role until 1992, when it was withdrawn as part of a series of post–Cold War defence cuts.

== Background ==
In the late 1950s, the United Kingdom began the process of replacing its early second-generation jet combat aircraft. During this period, aircraft of the RAF and Fleet Air Arm were largely sourced from the British aerospace industry. The 1957 Defence White Paper precipitated a major reorganization of that industry: the government compelled major aerospace manufacturers to amalgamate using new aircraft contracts as an incentive, having cancelled several ongoing projects. By the early 1960s, the major constituents were British Aircraft Corporation (BAC) (previously English Electric, Vickers-Armstrongs, Bristol Aircraft and Hunting) and Hawker Siddeley Aviation (previously Hawker, Avro, Gloster, Armstrong Whitworth, Folland, de Havilland and Blackburn). (Note: Whitworth Gloster Aircraft (originally formed by the merger of Armstrong Whitworth, Gloster), and Avro merged with Hawker Siddeley in 1963.)

The RAF wished to replace the English Electric Canberra light bomber in the long-range interdictor role, and the Hawker Hunter in the close air support role, while the Royal Navy (RN) sought an aircraft to assume the fleet air defence role from the de Havilland Sea Vixen. English Electric and Vickers had been working together on a high-performance strike aircraft, the TSR-2, which was intended for long-range, low-level strike missions with conventional and tactical nuclear weapons, as well as tactical reconnaissance. It was soon a victim of cost overruns. Hawker Siddeley was developing the P.1154, a proposed supersonic version of its P.1127 V/STOL demonstrator, that could be marketed to both the RAF and RN to fulfil several roles, including close air support, air superiority, and fleet air defence. Inter-service rivalry led to two very different specifications being submitted for the P.1154 that were impossible to fulfil with a single airframe. (Note: The RN were seeking a two-seat, two-engined interceptor, intended to operate at high level and equipped with a powerful radar and fire control system. The RAF's requirement was for a single-seat, single-engined close air support aircraft operating at low level.)

Unsatisfied, in February 1964 the Royal Navy withdrew its interest in P.1154 and began a procurement process that selected the McDonnell F-4 Phantom II (Note: McDonnell merged with the Douglas Aircraft Company in 1967 to form McDonnell Douglas.) (Note: The F-4 was the second time that McDonnell had used the name "Phantom" for one of its aircraft, hence it officially being referred to as the Phantom II. The original Phantom was a first generation carrier-based fighter that saw limited service in the US Navy and US Marine Corps between 1947 and 1950.) – then in service with the United States Navy (USN) – as its primary air defence aircraft, intended to be operated from both existing and planned aircraft carriers. (Note: The Phantom was also used in the carrier-based role by the United States Marine Corps, and as a land-based interceptor and ground attack aircraft with the United States Air Force (in whose service it was initially designated as the F-110 Spectre prior to the introduction of the 1962 United States Tri-Service aircraft designation system).) This better suited the RN, as the Phantom had two engines (providing redundancy in the event of an engine failure), was cheaper than the P.1154, and was available immediately.

In October 1964, a general election brought the Labour Party back into power. The new government undertook a defence review, which led to the cancellation of several projects, including both the P.1154 and the TSR-2 in early 1965. This was followed by the publication in February 1966 of a defence white paper, through which the government had to find alternatives to replace the Canberra and Hunter for the RAF. To replace the Canberra in the long-range role (which was intended for the TSR-2), the General Dynamics F-111 was selected, with the intention that the RAF buy a new variant with a sizable amount of British technology; the roles undertaken by the Hunter (for which P.1154 was intended) would be covered by a further purchase of F-4 Phantoms.

Partly as a means of maintaining employment in the British aerospace industry, agreement was reached that major portions of the UK's Phantoms would be built domestically. Hawker Siddeley Aviation was thus appointed as McDonnell's primary UK partner in January 1965, to be responsible for repair, maintenance, design and modification work on Phantoms for the RAF and RN at Brough Aerodrome. Further work was delegated to BAC, at its Warton facility, and to Short Brothers in Belfast.

The F-4J variant, which was then the primary version in service with the USN, was the basis for the UK aircraft, subject to major redesign. The most significant change to the aircraft was the use of the larger and more powerful Rolls-Royce Spey turbofan in place of the General Electric J79 turbojet, to allow operations from the RN's smaller carriers. (Note: The Spey 203, fitted to the F-4K, could generate a maximum of 20,500 lbf (91 kN) of thrust. The J79-10 as fitted to the F-4J produced a maximum of 17,900 lbf (80 kN).) To accommodate the larger engines, BAC redesigned and built the entire rear fuselage section. The Westinghouse AN/AWG-10 fire control system carried by the F-4J was to be built under licence by Ferranti. Approximately half of the structure and equipment of the UK's Phantoms was produced by British manufacturers; all the components were then shipped to St. Louis for assembly by McDonnell. Around 43% of the price of each airframe went to UK companies. The changes to the aircraft led to the two variants being given their own separate US series letters, the Fleet Air Arm version being designated as the F-4K and the RAF version as the F-4M. (Note: The designation F-4L was used for several proposed Phantom variants — Model 98EX was planned as a J79-powered version with high lift wing and tail, increased fuel capacity and higher weight limits; Model 98FO was intended as a Spey-powered version of Model 98EX; and Model 98FOA was to be a Spey-powered variant capable of carrying more missiles (including the AIM-54 Phoenix and AGM-45 Shrike) and improved avionics.)

The RN was happy with the Phantom as its Sea Vixen replacement, given that the type had been operational in the fleet air defence role with the USN since 1961. USN Phantoms had also successfully undertaken touch-and-go landings on HMS Hermes and HMS Victorious, with Victorious able to successfully launch and recover USN Phantoms from the carrier USS Ranger during her 1966 Far East deployment. The RAF was less enthusiastic, as the Phantom was not optimised for the close air support role and had been selected as its Hunter replacement more as a way of decreasing the per-unit cost of the overall UK order. (Note: The United States Air Force operated the F-4C and F-4D versions of the Phantom as both a ground attack aircraft and an interceptor, but the US Navy's F-4J, from which the RAF's F-4M was derived, was primarily used for air defence, with only a secondary ground attack capability.)

Initially, there was an intention to purchase up to 400 aircraft for the RN and the RAF, but the development cost for the changes to accommodate the new engines and other equipment meant that the per-unit price eventually ended up more than twice the price of an F-4J. The estimate of the total cost of the project was £300 million in 1966. By the time the last aircraft had been delivered, the total cost was £500 million, £200 million of which was spent on the elements of the aircraft produced in the UK. Due to government policy, the budget for Phantom procurement was fixed. This meant these costs could not be evened out by a large production run, and only 170 aircraft were procured. (Note: An additional 51 airframes were initially included in the UK's order that were subsequently cancelled.)

== Operational history ==
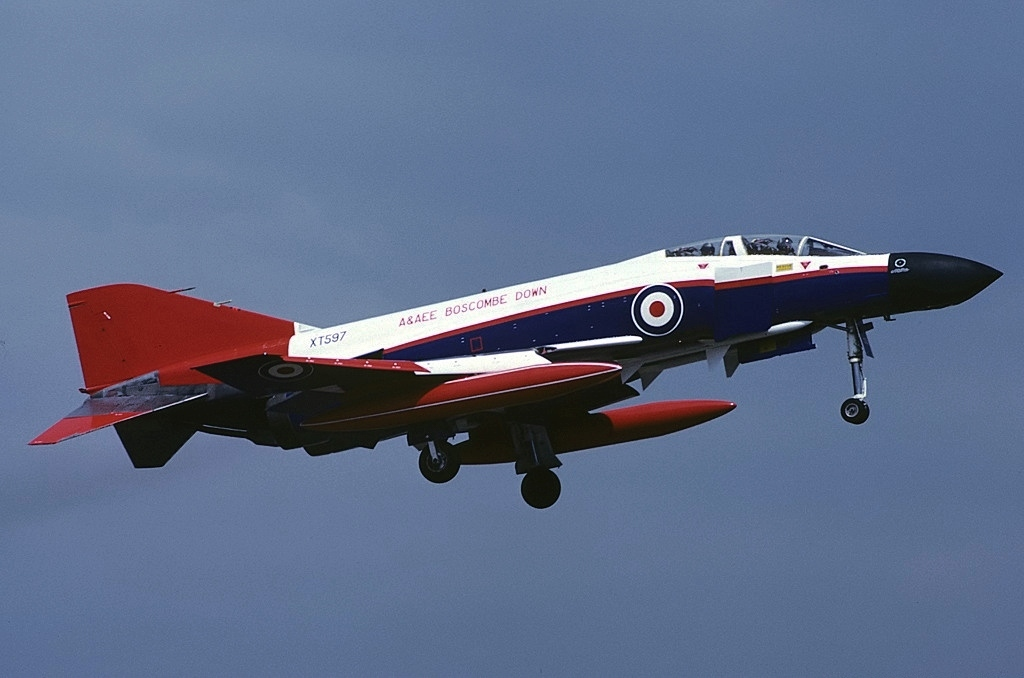
A pre-production F-4K (XT597) of the A&AEE

=== Prototypes ===
At first, the British Government ordered a total of four prototypes, designated as YF-4K and YF-4M, with two of each built. The first UK Phantom, a YF-4K, initially flew on 27 June 1966 at the McDonnell plant in St. Louis. This aircraft primarily tested the Spey turbofan engines and, as such, was not fitted with a full set of UK equipment. After this, the second YF-4K made its maiden flight on 31 August 1966. The following year, the two YF-4M prototypes also flew for the first time, with all four aircraft primarily used as part of McDonnell's testing programme. In addition to the four prototypes, a pair of pre-production F-4K aircraft were also produced, which were initially used for fit check trials of the various systems to be fitted. The first was used for catapult/arrestor and deck landing trials, (Note: The first deck trials were carried out on USS Coral Sea in July 1968.) and the second was primarily for testing the radar and missile systems. All six test aircraft remained with McDonnell until they were delivered to the UK in 1969 and 1970 for continued test work by the Aeroplane and Armament Experimental Establishment (A&AEE), (Note: Phantoms were assigned to two separate elements within the A&AEE – 'A' Squadron was the Fast Jet Evaluation element, to which the majority of aircraft earmarked for testing were allocated, while 'C' Squadron was the Naval Testing element, intended to clear the aircraft for operation at sea. FG.1s, FGR.2s and F.3s were temporarily assigned at various points to 'A' Squadron, but only FG.1s were used by 'C' Squadron.) (Note: Although the Phantom was withdrawn from use by the UK armed forces in 1992, it continued in government service until January 1994, when one of the pre-production FG.1 aircraft, which had served its entire career in the UK as a test aircraft with the A&AEE, made its final flight.) Ministry of Defence Procurement Executive, Rolls-Royce, and BAC, later British Aerospace. (Note: One of the pre-production F-4K airframes was later upgraded to a full production model for operational service.)

=== F-4K Phantom FG.1 ===
F-4K Phantom FG.1
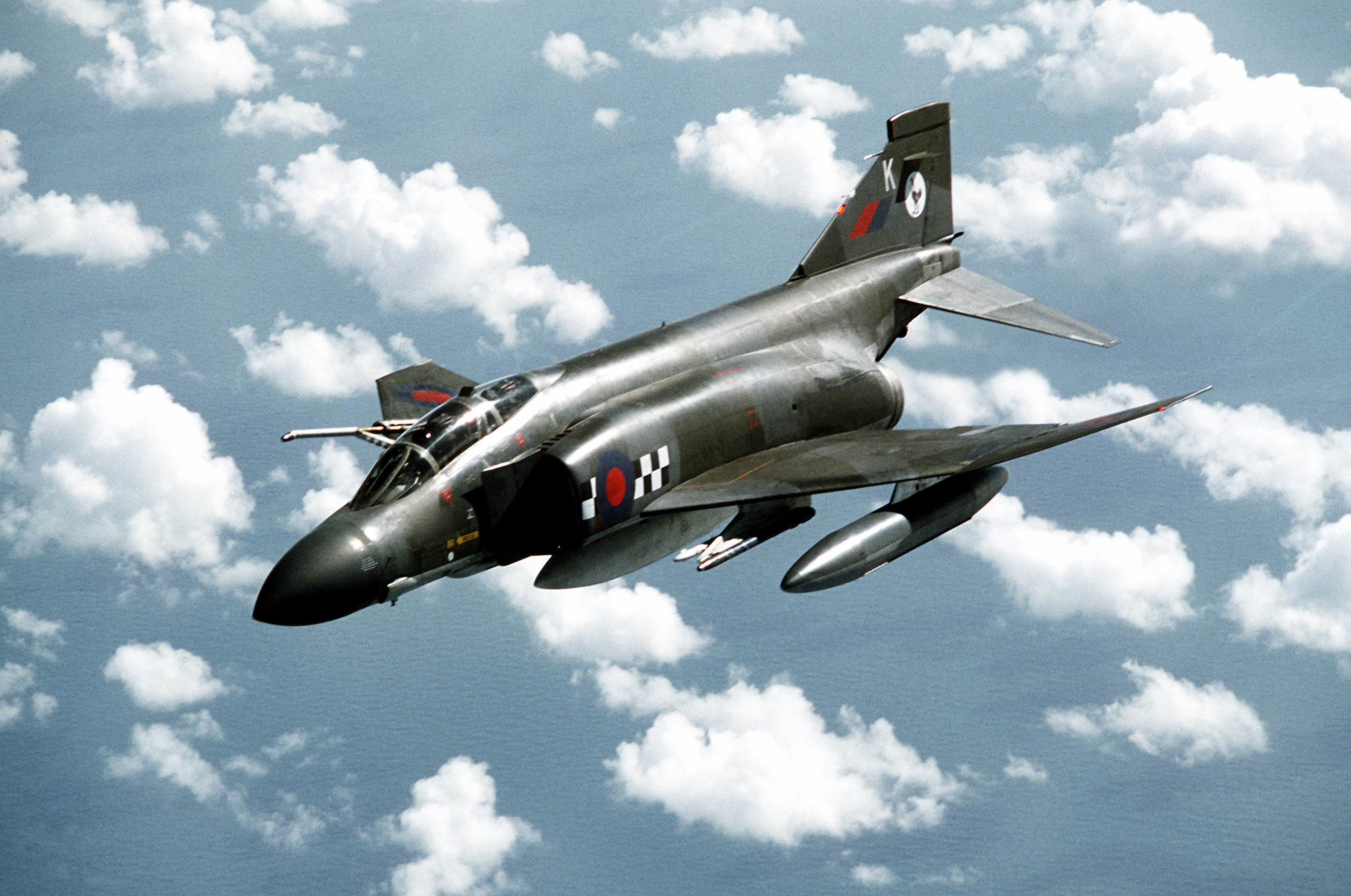
- A Royal Air Force Phantom FG.1 of No. 43 Squadron in 1980

General information
- Type: Fleet air defence fighter Air defence interceptor
- National origin: United States
- Manufacturer: McDonnell Douglas
- Status: Retired
- Primary user: Fleet Air Arm; Royal Air Force
- Number built: 52 (incl. 2 prototypes)
- Serial: XT595 – XT598; XT857 – XT876; XV565 – XV592; XV604 – XV610 (cancelled)

History
- Manufactured: 1966–1969
- Introduction date: Fleet Air Arm: 30 April 1968; 58 years ago Royal Air Force: 1 September 1969; 57 years ago
- First flight: 27 June 1966; 60 years ago
- Retired: Fleet Air Arm: 27 November 1978; 47 years ago Royal Air Force: 30 January 1990; 36 years ago

==== Royal Navy ====
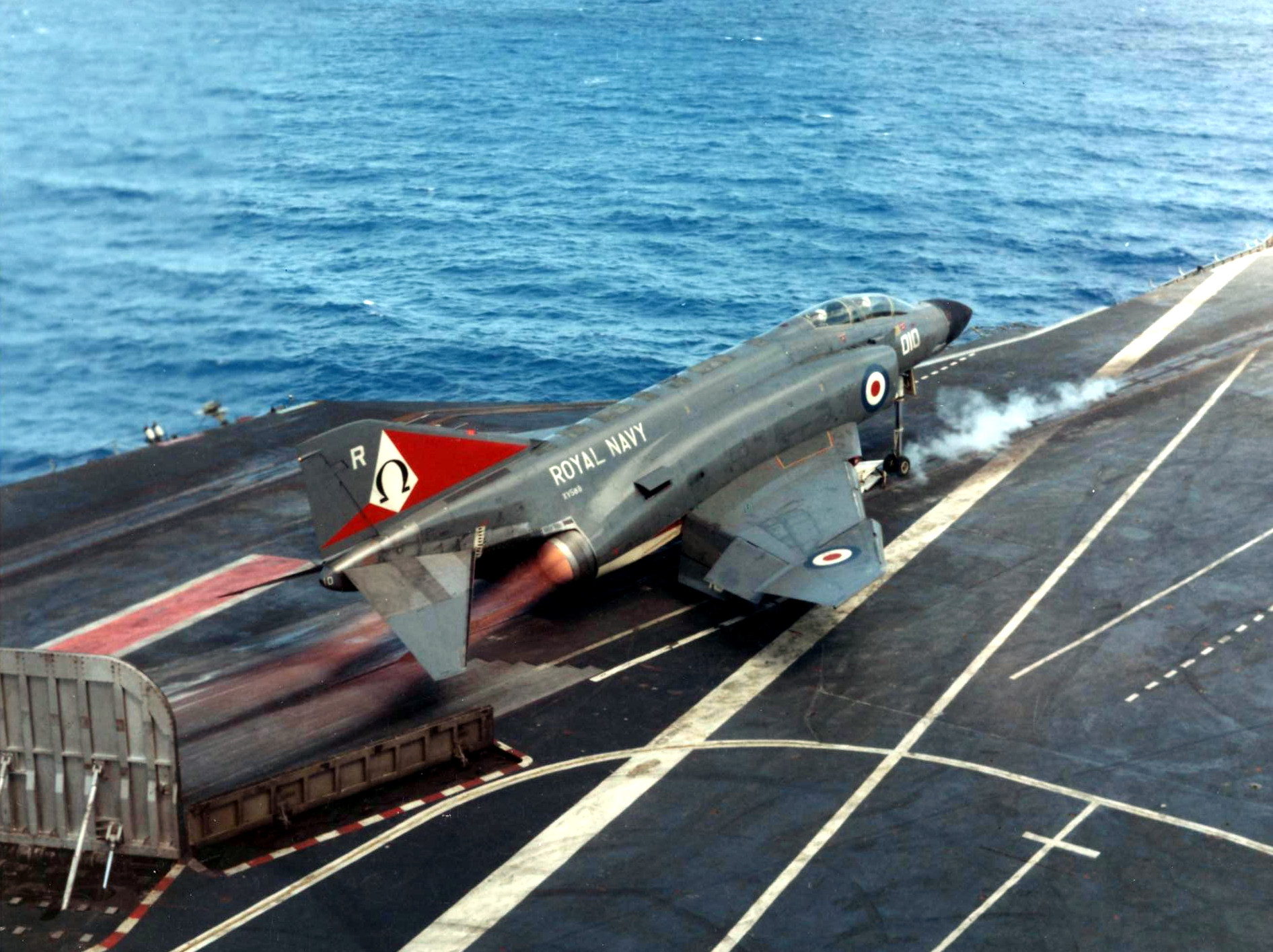
The heat from the Spey's afterburners required the installation of special water-cooled jet blast deflectors aboard HMS Ark Royal to avoid extensive damage to the flight deck.

On 1 July 1964, the Phantom was ordered for the Fleet Air Arm, to serve as the RN's primary fleet air defence aircraft, with a secondary strike capability. It was intended that these aircraft would operate from four aircraft carriers: HMS Eagle and HMS Ark Royal – both of which would be rebuilt to enable the operation of the aircraft (Note: Although Eagle and Ark Royal were the largest ships in the UK's carrier fleet, some sources have stated that the plan for Phantom operation would have seen the aircraft used aboard Victorious or Hermes. Hermes had only been in commission for five years in 1964 and Victorious had undergone an eight-year reconstruction from 1950 to 1958, but both were considerably smaller than Eagle and Ark Royal and would have been limited in the number of Phantoms they could have operated.) – plus at least two planned ships of a proposed new carrier design, CVA-01. (Note: There were initial plans for as many as four CVA-01 aircraft carriers, replacing Eagle, Ark Royal, Victorious, and Hermes. The cost of the Polaris ballistic missile as the UK's nuclear deterrent led to one of the ships being deleted from the proposal in 1963. The proposal crystallised into a plan for one ship intended to replace Victorious and Ark Royal, while Eagle and Hermes were to undergo major refits. This would provide a three-carrier force up to 1980. Consideration for the two additional CVA-01 carriers to replace Eagle and Hermes would take place closer to their intended out-of-service dates.)

Comparison of UK fleet carriers
| Carrier | Displacement | Length | Beam | Size of air group |
|---|---|---|---|---|
| HMS Queen Elizabeth (Note: Queen Elizabeth was the name given to the first CVA-01 aircraft carrier prior to the project's cancellation in February 1966.) (proposed) | 63,000 long tons (64,000 t) | 925 ft (282 m) | 184 ft (56 m) | Up to 50 (Note: The air group for CVA-01 was to have been made up of 18 Phantoms, 18 Buccaneers, 4 Gannets for AEW (to be replaced by a new aircraft) plus one for COD, 5 ASW helicopters, plus another two helicopters for plane guard / search and rescue.) |
| HMS Ark Royal | 53,000 long tons (54,000 t) | 803 ft 5 in (244.88 m) | 171 ft (52 m) | 39 (Note: Ark Royal's final air group encompassed 12 Phantoms, 14 Buccaneers, 4 Gannets for AEW plus one for COD, 6 ASW helicopters, plus another two helicopters for plane guard / search and rescue.) |
| HMS Eagle | 54,100 long tons (55,000 metric tons) | 811 ft 5 in (247.32 m) | 171 ft (52 m) | 41 (Note: Eagle's final air group encompassed 14 Sea Vixens, 14 Buccaneers, 4 Gannets for AEW plus one for COD, 6 ASW helicopters, plus another two helicopters for plane guard / search and rescue.) |
| HMS Victorious | 35,500 long tons (36,100 metric tons) | 781 ft (238 m) | 157 ft (48 m) | 33 (Note: Victorious's final air group encompassed 11 Sea Vixens, 10 Buccaneers, 4 Gannets for AEW plus one for COD, 6 ASW helicopters, plus another two helicopters for plane guard / search and rescue.) |
| HMS Hermes | 28,700 long tons (29,200 metric tons) | 744 ft (227 m) | 144.5 ft (44.0 m) | 30 (Note: Hermes's final air group encompassed 11 Sea Vixens, 7 Buccaneers, 4 Gannets for AEW plus one for COD, 6 ASW helicopters, plus another two helicopters for plane guard / search and rescue.) |

The requirements for the intended force of four aircraft carriers meant that five Fleet Air Arm squadrons of Phantoms would be needed. (Note: Flying squadrons of the Fleet Air Arm use the title "naval air squadron" (NAS).) Following the change of government in October 1964, and the 1966 Defence White Paper, the new carriers were cancelled, and a gradual rundown of fixed-wing aviation in the RN was begun. This led to a reduction in the total order from 140 to 48, with options for another seven. The intention was to form a pair of front-line squadrons, each of twelve aircraft, to operate from the two remaining, heavily modernised fleet carriers. The remaining 24 aircraft would form a training unit, and provide a reserve pool in the event of aircraft losses.

The RN received its first F-4K Phantoms, which were given the British designation FG.1, in April 1968. (Note: Under the British designation system, 'F' stands for 'Fighter', 'G' for 'Ground Attack' and 'R' for 'Reconnaissance', and the numeral indicates the Mark number. The FG.1 was the first mark of Phantom and operated in the fighter and ground attack roles; the FGR.2 was the second variant and had reconnaissance as a mission as well as the fighter and ground attack roles. The F.3 was the third variant, and operated solely as a fighter.) These were assigned to 700P Naval Air Squadron (700P NAS), which was to serve as the Intensive Flying Trials Unit (IFTU). (Note: An Intensive Flying Trials Unit (IFTU) is a Fleet Air Arm unit that specialises in intensive operational testing of new aircraft, with a new unit formed for each type. Since 1957, all IFTUs have been formed by 700 Naval Air Squadron, with a letter added to the squadron's number to indicate the aircraft that is being tested – hence the Phantom IFTU was numbered as 700P Naval Air Squadron.) After this, on completion of the successful flight trials, 767 Naval Air Squadron was commissioned in January 1969 as the Fleet Air Arm's operational conversion unit, followed at the end of March 1969 by 892 Naval Air Squadron, which was commissioned as the RN's first operational Phantom unit. (Note: In June 1959, ten years prior to becoming the first operational Phantom unit, 892 NAS had commissioned as the Fleet Air Arm's first operational Sea Vixen squadron.) (Note: 892 NAS was initially formed from the cadre of personnel from 700P NAS after it was disbanded.) During 892 NAS's initial work-up, three of its aircraft were entered into the Daily Mail Trans-Atlantic Air Race, a competition to commemorate the 50th anniversary of the first trans-Atlantic flight. One aircraft, crewed by Lt Commander Brian Davies and Lt Commander Pete Goddard, set a record of four hours and 46 minutes for the west to east crossing between Floyd Bennett Field in New York City and Wisley Airfield outside London, a record that stood for five years. (Note: The record-breaking flight on 11 May 1969 required two aerial refuellings from Victor tankers of the RAF – one south of Newfoundland and the other to the west of Iceland.)

As the Fleet Air Arm was receiving its first aircraft, the A&AEE had three FG.1s delivered to its 'C' Squadron for flight deck trials aboard Eagle. Two sets of trials were successfully carried out; the first, in March 1969, comprised approaches and touch-and-go landings, with the second, held the following June, involving full catapult launch and arrested recovery. (Note: The touch-and-go trials were conducted while Eagle was on post-refit trials in the English Channel, and saw the aircraft operate from land. For the full launch and recovery trials, the three Phantoms of the A&AEE were deployed to operate from Eagle as part of her air group for almost two weeks.) As a result of the reheat from the Spey turbofans, the ship's jet blast deflectors (JBD) were not used; instead a steel plate was fixed to the deck to absorb the heat of the engines building to launch, and fire hoses were used after each launch, to prevent them from melting.

To successfully accommodate the Phantom, Ark Royal had entered refit in 1967. The ship underwent a major reconstruction, including several elements to allow operation of the aircraft. This included increasing the area of the flight deck, which was also fully angled to 8.5°, and replacing the arresting gear with a new water-spray system to accommodate the Phantom's higher weight and landing speed. Bridle catchers (Note: The Phantom used a different launch bridle to other aircraft in the Fleet Air Arm. Because the Phantom's bridle was more expensive, bridle catchers were fitted to the ends of the new catapults installed in Ark Royal, so that the bridles could be reused.) and water-cooled JBDs (Note: The longer nosewheel oleo of the F-4K caused the aircraft's engines to be directed much lower than the American F-4Js. This, combined with the higher temperatures produced by the Spey's afterburners, damaged both the deck and the JBDs, and led to all launches of 892 NAS after the first two being at reduced power for the remainder of the squadron's deployment aboard USS Saratoga.) were fitted. Once this work was complete, Eagle was scheduled to undergo a similar modernisation. (Note: Eagle had undergone a major reconstruction from 1959 to 1964, which had seen her flight deck increased in area and angled to 8.5° and her catapults replaced by new, more powerful models, with one bow-mounted catapult and a second catapult mounted on the waist. These were upgraded in the ship's 1966–1967 refit, along with the installation of new arresting gear, which allowed the operation of the Phantom for the aircraft's deck trials. The refit of Ark Royal from 1967 to 1970, which brought her to a similar standard to Eagle, with additional modifications to operate the Phantom, cost approximately £32 million. The planned refit of Eagle, intended to begin once Ark Royal had recommissioned, was estimated to cost £15 million, of which £3 million was needed for the modifications to operate the Phantom.) But, in 1968, the government announced plans to completely phase out fixed-wing aviation in the RN, decommissioning all of its aircraft carriers by 1972. (Note: Victorious was paid off in March 1968 following a small fire just prior to the start of her last commission. Hermes was decommissioned in March 1971 to undergo reconstruction as a commando carrier solely operating helicopters. Eagle was withdrawn in January 1972 and placed "in reserve" at Devonport, to be used as a source of spares for maintaining Ark Royal.) The intended refit of Eagle was cancelled, the options for seven additional FG.1s were not taken up, and it was decided to further reduce the Fleet Air Arm's Phantom fleet to 28 aircraft. The 1970 change of government led to a reprieve for the Fleet Air Arm, as it was decided that the cost of refitting Ark Royal was too much for only two more years of use. This led to the ship being retained in service as the RN's sole aircraft carrier. (Note: The intended refit of Eagle had been estimated to cost £15 million in 1968. By the time the ship had been withdrawn, with the subsequent debate as to whether to retain her for continued service, the estimated cost of the proposed refit, including modifications for the Phantom, had gone up to between £25 million and £30 million. Nevertheless, there remained a campaign among parliamentarians to retain Eagle in maintained reserve, making the ship available for reactivation, in the period after she was decommissioned in 1972. Keeping Eagle in a state of maintained reserve was estimated to require up to 400 officers and men, with expenditure of £1.5 to £2 million per year. In addition to the cost of maintaining the ship, the retention of a quantity of increasingly obsolete Sea Vixens would also have been required, as Eagle was not fully converted to operate the Phantom.)

Ark Royal embarked 892 NAS as part of her air group for the first time in 1970, with 12 aircraft. (Note: Fleet Air Arm fixed-wing squadrons traditionally decorated the tails of their aircraft with a distinctive marking to identify the unit to which it belonged. During its time flying the Sea Vixen, 892 NAS's was initially a black fox head superimposed on a yellow crescent moon. By 1968 this had been updated, with a more stylised fox head superimposed on a full moon. Upon the unit's conversion to the Phantom, it was believed that 892 NAS would be the final carrier-based fixed-wing squadron to be commissioned into the Fleet Air Arm. Their Phantoms bore a capital Omega (Ω) on their tail fins, to symbolise their place at the end of the RN's era of fixed-wing aviation.) The first operational use of the RN's Phantoms had been in 1969, when 892 NAS had embarked for training on the US aircraft carrier USS Saratoga in the Mediterranean, and had undertaken air defence missions alongside the ship's own F-4Js. This deployment showed the necessity for the modifications fitted to Ark Royal; the initial launches from Saratoga saw the heat from the afterburners cause the deck plates to distort, leading to subsequent catapult launches being undertaken at reduced weight without the use of reheat. During Ark Royal's first three-year commission, 892 NAS, which had initially used RNAS Yeovilton in Somerset as its home base, moved to RAF Leuchars in Fife, where, during the periods when it was not embarked, it undertook Quick Reaction Alert (QRA) duties alongside No. 43 Squadron. (Note: During 892 NAS's time at Yeovilton, it was able to take advantage of its home base's location on the north side of the English Channel to engage in dissimilar air combat training against their counterparts from the Aéronavale flying the smaller F-8 Crusader and based at Landivisiau in Brittany.) At the same time, 767 NAS was disbanded as the RN's Phantom training unit; the squadron had been the joint training unit for both the Fleet Air Arm and the RAF in using the FG.1. In its place, an RAF-operated Phantom Training Flight was established at RAF Leuchars in August 1972. (Note: The disbanding of 767 NAS, and the transfer of 892 NAS to Leuchars, was part of a wider consolidation of the remaining Fleet Air Arm fixed-wing assets alongside equivalents operated by the RAF. At the same time, the Buccaneers of 809 NAS had their shore station transferred from RNAS Lossiemouth to RAF Honington, which was occupied by No. 12 Squadron and No. 237 OCU. No. 237 OCU also assumed responsibility for all Buccaneer training following the disbanding of 736 NAS.) The Phantom served in the Fleet Air Arm until 1978, when Ark Royal was withdrawn from service, leaving no ship in the RN capable of operating the type. (Note: The Fleet Air Arm's use of the Phantom aboard Ark Royal made the UK the only nation other than the United States to operate the type at sea from an aircraft carrier.)

The final catapult launch from Ark Royal was a Phantom of 892 NAS on 27 November 1978 during the disembarkation of the air group at the end of the ship's final deployment. Having left the ship, the squadron's aircraft, alongside all of the RN's remaining Phantoms, were delivered to RAF St Athan in Glamorgan, where they were handed over to the RAF. (Note: Ark Royal embarked 12 Phantoms of 892 NAS on 6 April 1978 alongside Buccaneers of 809 NAS, having departed on its final deployment a day earlier. By this time, some of the Fleet Air Arm's remaining Phantoms had already begun to be transferred to the RAF. Two of the Phantoms aboard Ark Royal returned to the UK on 18 November, for delivery to RAF St Athan, with the remaining ten disembarking for St Athan with the rest of the ship's air group on 27 November. The Gannets of 849 NAS were flown to RAF Lossiemouth for storage, while the Buccaneers of 809 NAS were delivered to St Athan and passed to the RAF at the same time as 892 NAS's Phantoms. The Phantoms went to No. 111 Squadron, which retained the type for a decade, while the Buccaneers were allocated to the newly formed No. 216 Squadron, which was disbanded after less than two years.)

==== Royal Air Force ====
Following the cancellation of the planned refit to allow HMS Eagle to operate the Phantom, 20 airframes originally ordered for the Fleet Air Arm were diverted to the RAF to serve in the air defence role. (Note: The reduction of the number of the Fleet Air Arm's Phantoms also affected the number of Phantoms specifically ordered for the RAF. The diversion of a number of already produced FG.1 airframes to the RAF allowed the production total of FGR.2s to then be reduced.) At the time, the RAF's primary interceptor was the English Electric Lightning, which had comparatively poor range, loiter time, and weapons fit. These limitations hampered its effectiveness, especially in long interceptions of Soviet Air Forces and Soviet Naval Aviation bombers and reconnaissance aircraft over the North Sea and North Atlantic. The 20 diverted airframes formed a new Phantom squadron at RAF Leuchars, the UK's most northerly air defence base at the time, to take advantage of the improvements the Phantom provided over the Lightning: it could carry more fuel, and had consequently better range and endurance; it was fitted with a more powerful radar; and it could carry more missiles (up to eight, compared to two for the Lightning). (Note: see data) On 1 September 1969, No. 43 Squadron formed at Leuchars, operating as part of the UK's northern Quick Reaction Alert (QRA) zone alongside the Lightnings of No. 11 Squadron and No. 23 Squadron. When, in March 1972, No. 11 Squadron was redeployed to join No. 5 Squadron at RAF Binbrook, it was replaced at Leuchars by the RN Phantoms of 892 NAS.

Upon the withdrawal of HMS Ark Royal in 1978, the Phantoms of the Fleet Air Arm were handed over to the RAF and used to form a second squadron at Leuchars. At the time, No. 111 Squadron was stationed at Leuchars operating the Phantom FGR.2, having replaced No. 23 Squadron there in 1975. (Note: No. 23 Squadron moved to RAF Wattisham as a Lightning squadron in May 1975, and converted to the Phantom FGR.2 in February 1976.) In 1978, to save costs resulting from the differences between the FG.1 and FGR.2, the squadron began converting to the ex-Navy aircraft and the FGR.2 airframes were distributed to other Phantom units. At the same time as No. 111 Squadron converted to the FG.1, the Phantom Training Flight, which had been resident at Leuchars since 1972, was disbanded, and responsibility for all Phantom conversion training passed to No. 228 Operational Conversion Unit (228 OCU). (Note: No. 228 Operational Conversion Unit, which had the shadow squadron identity of No. 64 Squadron, assumed responsibility for all Phantom training in 1978.)

Both RAF units retained the FG.1 until 1989 – on 31 July that year, No. 43 Squadron was stood down in preparation for conversion to the new Tornado F.3, which began with the arrival of the first examples two months later. (Note: The first Tornados intended for No. 43 Squadron arrived at Leuchars from RAF Coningsby on 23 September 1989. But, the station received its first Tornado, an unmarked example delivered direct from the factory at Warton intended for initial use as a training aid for the engineering staff at Leuchars, on 23 August.) Following the standing down of No. 43 Squadron, the FG.1s of No. 111 Squadron provided the sole QRA cover from Leuchars for the remainder of 1989 and into 1990, before being stood down on 31 January for conversion to the Tornado. Since the final withdrawal of the type from service, four complete FG.1 airframes, plus one of the YF-4K prototypes, have survived.

=== F-4M Phantom FGR.2 ===
F-4M Phantom FGR.2
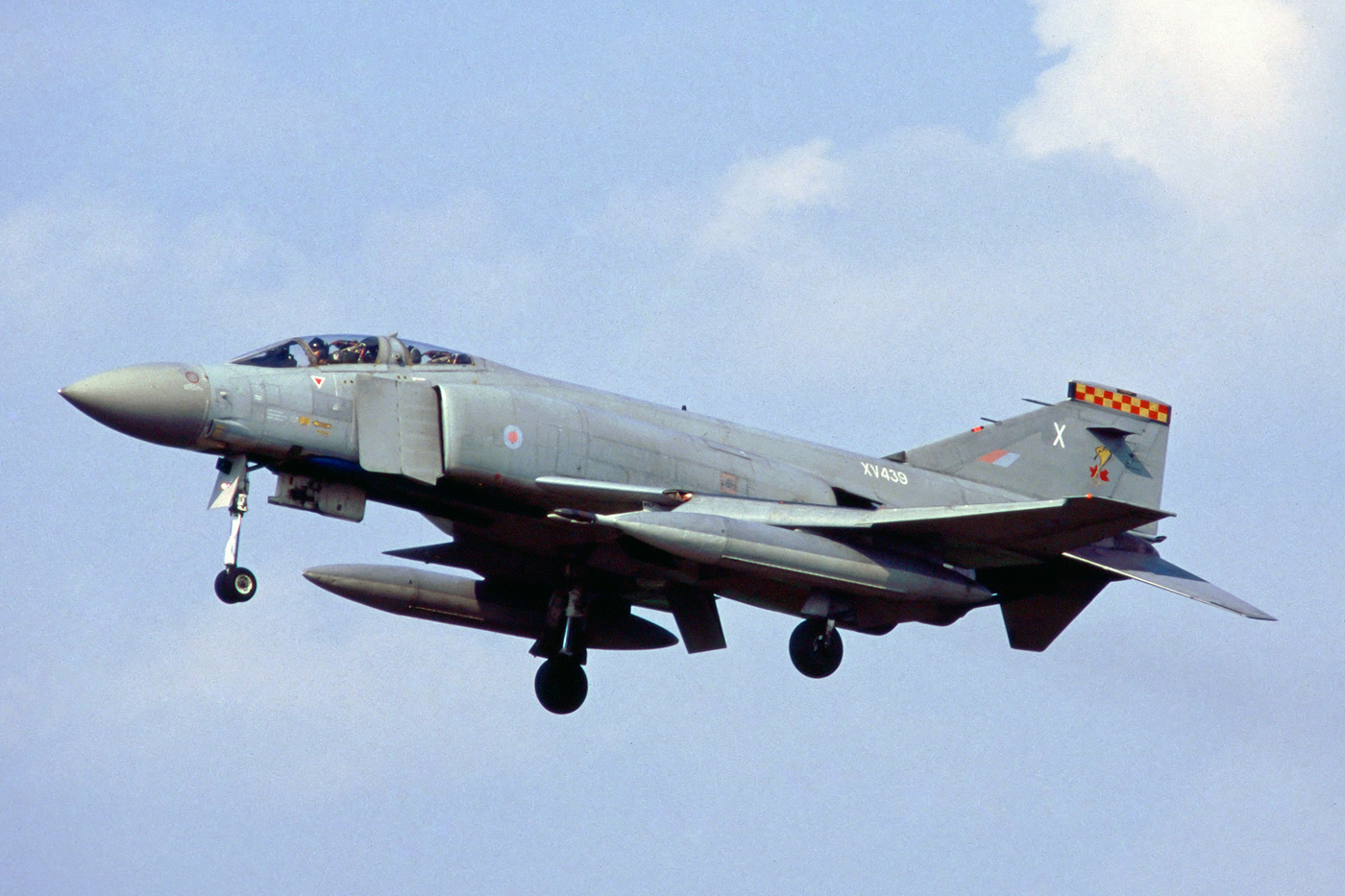
- A Royal Air Force Phantom FGR.2 of No. 92 Squadron in 1990

General information
- Type: Air defence interceptor Low level strike Close air support Tactical reconnaissance
- National origin: United States
- Manufacturer: McDonnell Douglas
- Status: Withdrawn
- Primary user: Royal Air Force
- Number built: 118 (incl. 2 prototypes)
- Serial: XT852 – XT853; XT891 – XT914; XT915 – XT928 (cancelled); XV393 – XV442; XV460 – XV501; XV520 – XV551 (cancelled)

History
- Manufactured: 1966–1969
- Introduction date: 23 August 1968; 58 years ago
- First flight: 17 February 1967; 59 years ago
- Retired: 1 November 1992; 33 years ago

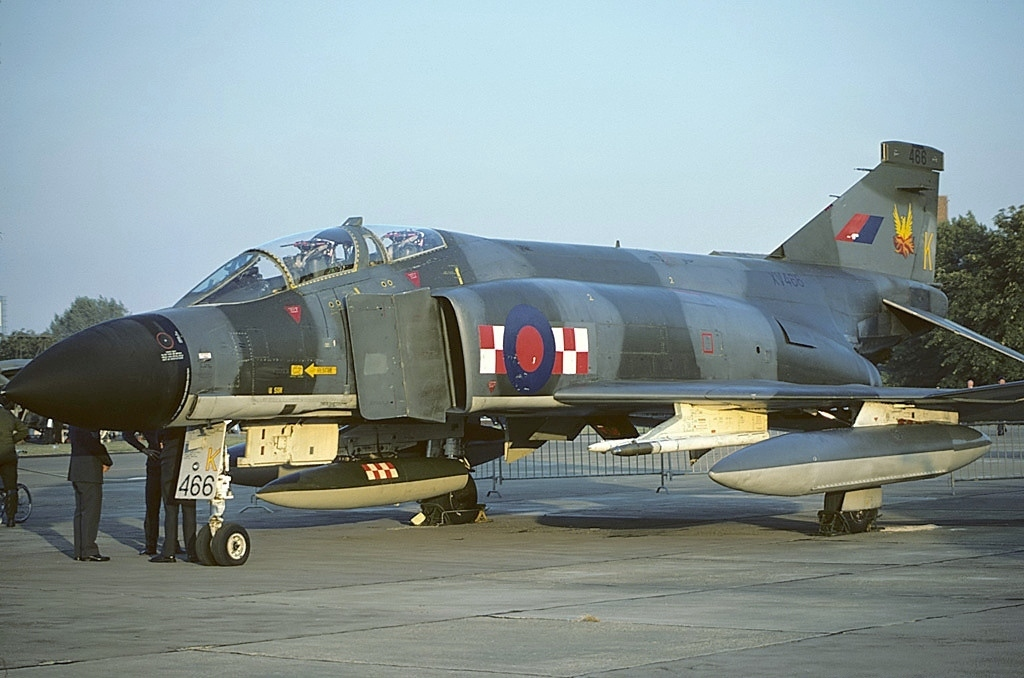
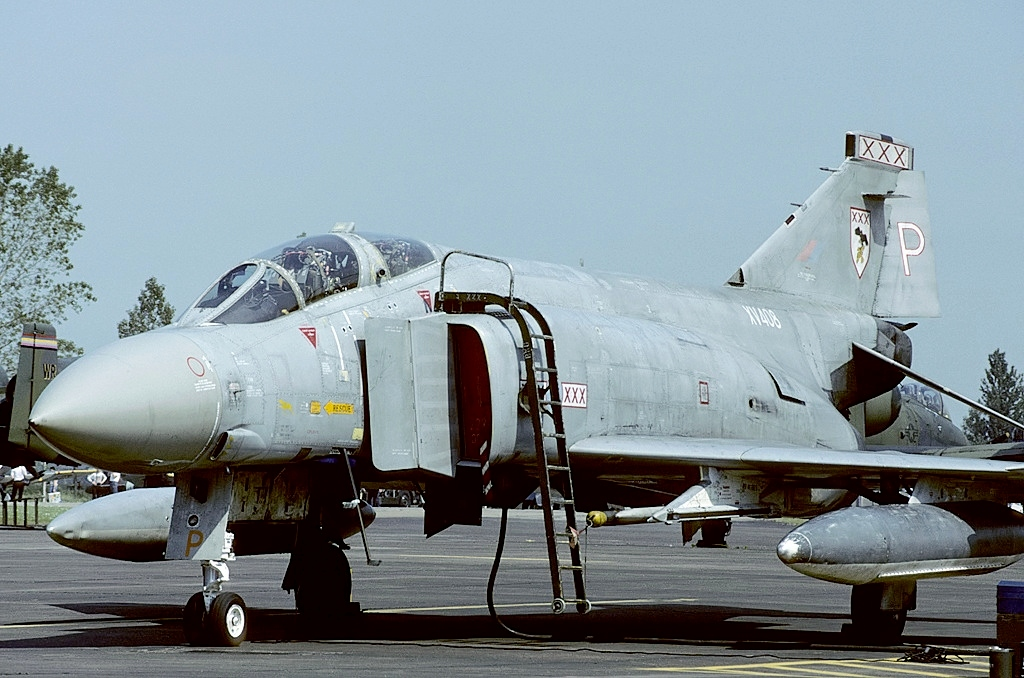
The Phantom was initially delivered to air defence units in green-grey camouflage (left). The RAF later adopted a pale grey colour scheme for its Phantoms (right).

==== Close air support ====
Following the cancellation of both the TSR-2 and P.1154 programmes, the RAF still needed aircraft for the long-range strike, close air support, and reconnaissance roles. Two aircraft types were ordered: the General Dynamics F-111K (a new variant specific for RAF use) for the long-range interdiction role, and the F-4M Phantom for close air support, with both aircraft to be fitted for reconnaissance. (Note: Unlike the Phantom, which was to carry a separate reconnaissance pod containing multiple cameras and other sensors, the F-111K was to feature a more integrated reconnaissance capability, with F95 cameras mounted in the aircraft's nose that would operate alongside a pallet containing a range of reconnaissance systems carried in its internal weapons bay.) The F-111K was cancelled in 1968 due to increasing costs, but 150 Phantoms were initially ordered for the RAF alongside the Phantom order for the RN. Ultimately only 118 Phantoms were purchased, with the final 32 units of the RAF order being cancelled. (Note: To replace the cancelled F-111K, the RAF began using the Buccaneer, with both examples transferred from the Fleet Air Arm and new-build airframes entering service.) The RAF Phantom, given the designation FGR.2, was broadly similar to the naval version, with some minor variations in terms of engines, avionics and structure relating to its use as a land-based rather than carrier-based aircraft.

The first RAF Phantom unit was No. 228 Operational Conversion Unit, which was stood up in August 1968. The Phantom entered operational service as part of RAF Strike Command in May 1969, when No. 6 Squadron was formed at RAF Coningsby in the tactical strike role. No. 54 Squadron was formed in September the same year, followed by No. 41 Squadron in 1972 as a tactical reconnaissance unit. A further four squadrons were formed under the auspices of RAF Germany in 1970 and 1971: No. 2 Squadron, No. 14 Squadron, No. 17 Squadron, and No. 31 Squadron, all at RAF Brüggen.

Along with their conventional strike role, No. 14, No. 17, and No. 31 Squadrons were assigned a tactical nuclear strike role by Supreme Headquarters Allied Powers Europe (SACEUR), using weapons supplied by the United States. (Note: In addition to the Phantom, RAF Germany also had two squadrons of Buccaneers, equipped with the British built WE.177, operating in the nuclear strike role in addition to conventional strike.) After initial work-up, No. 2 Squadron operated from RAF Laarbruch in the tactical reconnaissance role. The aircraft assigned to the two tactical reconnaissance units were wired to allow a pod to be carried containing four optical cameras, an infrared linescan and a sideways-looking radar.

In October 1970, the RAF ordered 165 examples of the SEPECAT Jaguar, intended to fill both the tactical strike and reconnaissance missions, replacing the Phantom. The Phantom had been purchased as a stop-gap to fulfil the close air support role. But, as it was derived from the interceptor version used by the US Navy, it was not especially well suited to operate as a close air support aircraft. By contrast, the Jaguar had been specifically designed to undertake both close air support and reconnaissance. The advent of the Jaguar led to a re-think of the Phantom's role as, at the same time, the limitations of the Lightning as an interceptor were becoming more apparent. The conversion of FGR.2 squadrons to the Jaguar, combined with its acquisition of the Blackburn Buccaneer as a long-range interdictor to enhance the RAF's strike capability, meant that it was possible to begin transferring Phantoms to operate purely as air defence interceptors. The first squadron to give up its Phantoms was No. 54 Squadron on 29 March 1974, with the last, No. 41 Squadron, being declared operational on the Jaguar in April 1977. (Note: The Jaguar was used by a total of eight RAF squadrons. Seven converted from the Phantom, with the eighth, No. 20 Squadron, having previously served as a Harrier unit.)

==== Air defence ====
In October 1974, No. 111 Squadron was declared operational on the Phantom FGR.2, becoming the first unit to operate the variant in the air defence role. (Note: The unit that ultimately became No. 111 Squadron began forming in mid-1974 as No. 111 (Designate) Squadron, using aircraft distributed from No. 54 Squadron that was converting to the Jaguar. No. 111 (Designate) Squadron began its training period at the same time as the existing No. 111 Squadron was drawing down its operations with the Lightning. The Lightning squadron was stood down on 30 September at RAF Wattisham, with the new Phantom squadron being declared operational the following day at RAF Coningsby.) Then, as more Jaguars were delivered, Phantoms were released enabling more Lightning squadrons to be converted; No. 19 Squadron and No. 92 Squadron, the forward-deployed air defence units in West Germany, converted in 1976 and 1977 respectively, at the same time moving from RAF Gütersloh, which was the closest RAF base to the East German border, to RAF Wildenrath, taking advantage of the Phantom's superior range over the Lightning. (Note: Because of their location, No. 19 and No. 92 Squadrons were closer to potential threats than interceptor squadrons located in the UK, and thus would work their aircraft harder. As a result, when they converted to the Phantom, they received aircraft that had largely been operating with No. 2 and No. 41 Squadrons, the pair of reconnaissance units, which had lower fatigue indices.) Three other UK-based units, No. 23 Squadron, No. 29 Squadron and No. 56 Squadron, were also converted between 1974 and 1976. No. 111 Squadron, which had been the first unit to use the FGR.2 as an interceptor, converted to the FG.1 version in 1979 following the transfer of the RN's remaining airframes to the RAF. The Phantom served as the RAF's primary interceptor for over a decade until the introduction into service of the Panavia Tornado F.3 in 1987.

When Phantoms were first delivered to interceptor squadrons, they remained in the grey-green disruptive colouration camouflage scheme more associated with the strike and close air support missions they had originally undertaken. During the late 1970s, the RAF began experimenting with new colours for its air defence units. In October 1978, No. 56 Squadron was tasked with trialling proposed new schemes, with one of its Phantom FGR.2s the first to be painted in the new "air superiority grey" colour combined with small low-visibility roundels and markings. (Note: The new air superiority grey colour was colloquially referred to as "barley grey" in the RAF.) After the completion of the colour trials and the adoption of the new grey colour scheme, the roundel remained in low-visibility colours, but individual squadron markings eventually returned to more observable sizes and colours.

In May 1982, three Phantoms from No. 29 Squadron were forward deployed to RAF Wideawake on Ascension Island. The Phantoms were tasked with providing air cover for the RAF's operations during the Falklands War, replacing Harriers of No. 1 Squadron that were en route to the war zone. Having made a 10.5-hour, 4,000-mile transit on 24 May, one of the longest non-stop flights by a fighter aircraft in the history of the RAF, the first two Phantoms arrived and were immediately prepared for QRA duties. The originally open-ended deployment ultimately lasted a total of five weeks, with the Phantom detachment on Ascension being stood down on 14 July. In October 1982, following the end of the conflict and the reconstruction of the runway, No. 29 Squadron detached nine of its aircraft to RAF Stanley, where they assumed responsibility for the air defence of the Falkland Islands from the Sea Harriers of 809 NAS, which had been operating from the aircraft carrier HMS Illustrious. (Note: Following the war, the runway at Stanley had to be extended to operate the Phantom. The eventual length, including the temporary section made from aluminium planking, was 6,000 ft (1,800 m), just enough for the Phantom. With little margin for error in length, and the runway being fairly narrow, arresting gear was installed, and arrested landings were the norm for Phantom operations until the opening of RAF Mount Pleasant in 1985.) Over the course of the unit's time in the South Atlantic, the original personnel from No. 29 Squadron returned to the UK to be replaced by personnel from other Phantom squadrons. This turnover of personnel led to the unit becoming officially referred to as simply "Phandet" (short for "Phantom Detachment") until, in March 1983, No. 23 Squadron officially took up the role. (Note: The Phantom detachment at RAF Stanley operated alongside a detachment of Harrier GR.3 aircraft. Initially known as simply the Harrier Detachment or "HarDet", in August 1983 this unit assumed the identity of No. 1453 Flight. The Harriers were primarily used in their principal role of close air support, but their STOVL capability allowed them to provide a back-up on QRA duties in conditions when operating the Phantom was too difficult. No. 1453 Flight remained in the Falklands until June 1985 when RAF Mount Pleasant was opened.) No. 23 Squadron remained in the Falklands until October 1988, after which it returned to the UK. (Note: The identity of No. 23 Squadron was removed from the Phantom unit at Mount Pleasant on 31 October 1988, and assigned the following day to a newly formed Tornado squadron at RAF Leeming.) Its role as the main air defence unit in the Falklands was taken up by No. 1435 Flight. (Note: No. 1435 Flight had previously operated in the Falklands when, in July 1982, a detachment of Harriers was sent ashore to operate from Port Stanley to provide air defence on the islands directly, alongside Sea Harriers of the Fleet Air Arm operating from HMS Invincible. This detachment was given the identity of No. 1435 Flight the following year, remaining in the Falklands until 1985.)

Initially, it was intended that Phantoms and Tornados would serve alongside each other. A total of 152 Tornado F.3s were ordered for the RAF, enough to convert four squadrons of Phantoms and two of Lightnings but insufficient to completely convert every air defence squadron. (Note: A total of seven squadrons ultimately operated the Tornado – No. 5 Squadron and No. 11 Squadron converted from the Lightning, and No. 23 Squadron, No. 29 Squadron, No. 43 Squadron and No. 111 Squadron were previously Phantom units. The seventh Tornado unit, No. 25 Squadron, previously operated the Bloodhound surface-to-air missile until reforming as a Tornado squadron.) The intention was to retain a pair of UK-based Phantom squadrons at RAF Wattisham until the early 2000s, alongside a pair of Tornado units at RAF Coningsby to provide air defence cover for the southern half of the UK Air Defence Region. Another two squadrons stationed in Germany would also be retained. However, the end of the Cold War saw an alteration to this policy, with the Phantom instead withdrawn from service under the Options for Change defence review. (Note: Options for Change also saw the withdrawal from service of the Buccaneer strike aircraft from the RAF. The Buccaneer had served alongside the Phantom in the Fleet Air Arm, making this the second time that the two types were withdrawn as a result of the same policy.) This led to the disbanding of No. 228 Operational Conversion Unit in January 1991, with the Phantom Training Flight (which had previously operated as the FG.1 training unit between 1972 and 1978) re-established under the administration of No. 74 Squadron to run refresher courses on the type for twelve months.

As part of the gradual rundown of the RAF's presence in Germany, the two forward-based units were to be disbanded, and there would also be a reduction in the overall number of air defence squadrons, leading to the two UK-based units being disbanded in late 1992. (Note: The disbanding of the two UK-based Phantom squadrons without replacement left responsibility for the UK's air defence to the seven squadrons of Tornados at RAF Leuchars (2 squadrons), RAF Leeming (3 squadrons) and RAF Coningsby (2 squadrons).) (Note: No. 1435 Flight, the air defence unit in the Falkland Islands, had its four Phantoms replaced by an equivalent number of Tornado F.3s in July 1992. The new aircraft continued the tradition that had been started upon the flight's formation in 1988, of naming its aircraft after a famed trio of Gloster Sea Gladiators operated in Malta during the Second World War. With single-letter tail codes matching each initial, three of the flight's aircraft were named as Faith, Hope and Charity; the fourth received the name Desperation.) (Note: The Hellenic Air Force, which had operated the F-4E since 1974, expressed an interest in purchasing some of the RAF's F-4Ms in 1992 but ultimately decided against the idea as they were too different to the version used in Greece.) Just prior to the final withdrawal of the Phantom, it was recalled operationally as a result of Operation Granby, the UK's participation in the First Gulf War, when aircraft from No. 19 and No. 92 Squadrons were forward deployed to provide air defence cover at RAF Akrotiri on Cyprus; this was to replace the Tornados that had been deployed there on exercise, and were then sent to the Gulf region. Since the withdrawal of the FGR.2, a total of 12 complete airframes have survived.

=== Phantom F-4J(UK) ===
F-4J(UK) Phantom
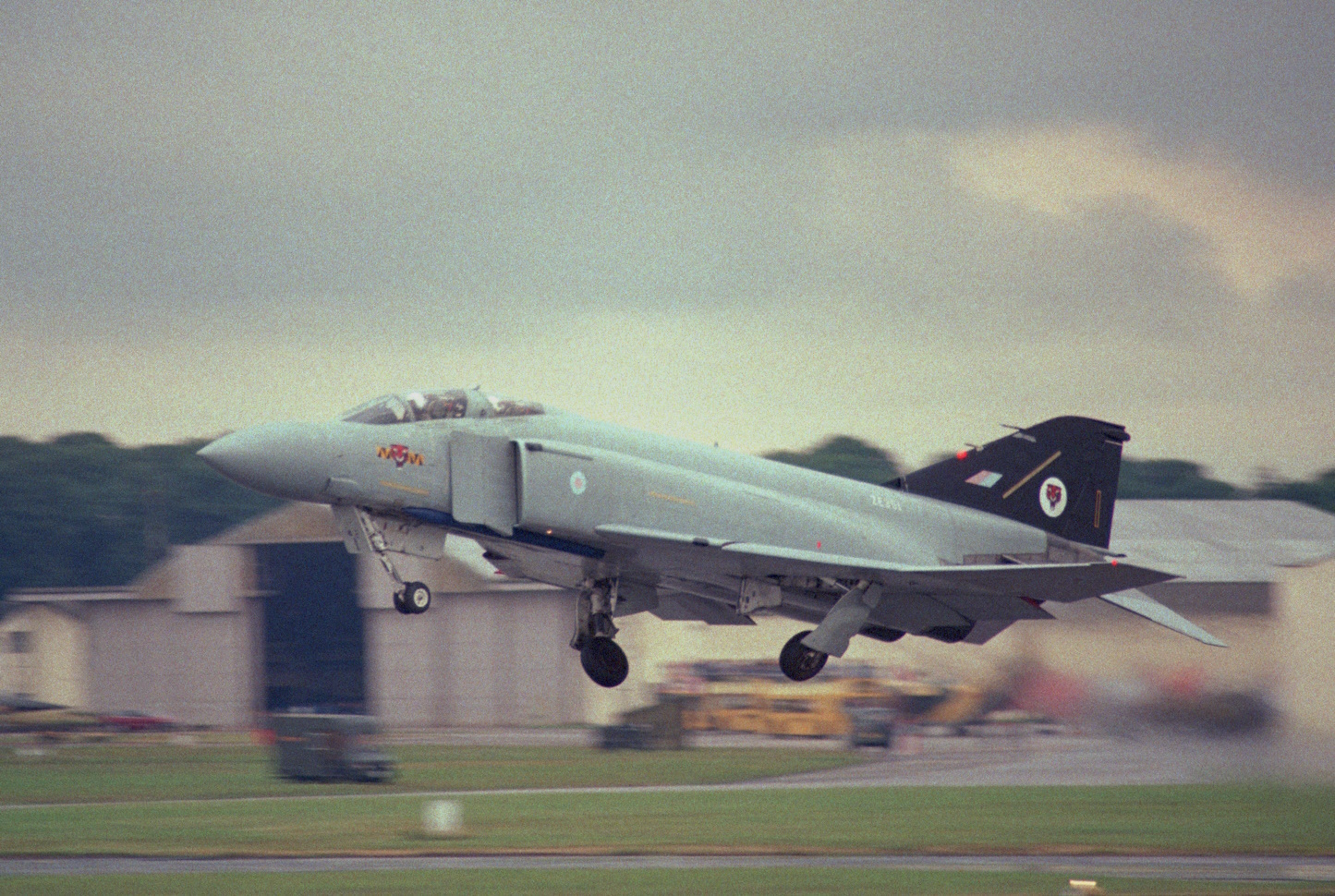
- A Royal Air Force Phantom F-4J(UK) of No. 74 Squadron in 1987

General information
- Type: Air defence interceptor
- National origin: United States
- Manufacturer: McDonnell Douglas (Build); Naval Air Rework Facility (Refurbishment)
- Status: Withdrawn
- Primary user: Royal Air Force
- Number built: 15
- Serial: ZE350 – ZE364

History
- Manufactured: 1983–1984
- Introduction date: 19 October 1984; 42 years ago
- First flight: 10 August 1984; 42 years ago
- Retired: 31 January 1991; 35 years ago

In 1982, following the deployment of a Phantom squadron to the Falkland Islands, the government decided that the resulting gap in the UK's air defences needed to be filled, and so sought to raise an additional interceptor squadron. Although, at that time, there were surplus Lightnings in storage, a lack of pilots qualified on the type prevented the formation of a third Lightning squadron, a proposal that had originally been mooted in 1979. (Note: The RAF had also discussed potentially procuring surplus Phantoms from the United States to boost their fighter force during the late 1970s.) To fill the gap resulting from the transfer of No. 23 Squadron to the South Atlantic, the government decided to purchase another squadron's worth of Phantoms. (Note: When the idea to purchase additional aircraft to bolster the UK's air defences following the Falklands conflict was first mooted, the F-14 Tomcat and F-15 Eagle were among the initial aircraft proposed. Both were dismissed on the grounds of cost and logistical differences, with the proposal solidifying around the idea of obtaining a platform that shared commonality with the existing infrastructure. This led to the plan to obtain additional Phantoms.) Because the aircraft in RAF service were a special production batch built to UK specifications, it was not possible to obtain identical aircraft, and so the RAF looked to versions of the Phantom that were as close as possible to their existing variants.

Initially, the UK looked to buy a batch of F-4S aircraft, the most up-to-date version of the Phantom in service with the US Navy, having been produced through a programme to update the existing F-4J with new engines, hydraulics, electronics and modified wings. The US Navy could not spare enough F-4S aircraft at the time to allow the RAF to establish an entire squadron. (Note: When the RAF were looking for a new Phantom squadron, the F-4S still equipped eight fleet air defence squadrons operating from aircraft carriers of the Midway and Forrestal classes that could not, at the time, operate the F-14 Tomcat.) So, as a fall-back option, surplus US Navy and US Marine Corps F-4J aircraft were looked at instead. Because the F-4J was the variant from which the RAF's F-4Ks and F-4Ms were developed, it was the closest available version in similarity to the British aircraft. Fifteen airframes, each with no more than 4,300 hours, were selected from among the best of the F-4Js stored at the Aerospace Maintenance and Regeneration Center at Davis–Monthan Air Force Base in Arizona. (Note: Although the majority of the selected airframes were airworthy enough to make the relatively short ferry flight from Davis-Monthan AFB to NAS North Island, some needed to be airlifted as underslug loads by helicopter. During one of the airlift flights, the canopy of the Phantom detached and caused the webbing holding the aircraft in place to come loose, which led to the Phantom falling into the sea.)

The 15 F-4Js were extensively refurbished at the Naval Air Rework Facility (NARF) at Naval Air Station North Island and brought to a standard almost equivalent to the F-4S, the only differences being the absence of both leading-edge slats and a helmet-mounted gun sight. Work began in September 1983, with the rollout of the first completed aircraft in August 1984. Two months later, sufficient numbers had arrived at RAF Wattisham in Suffolk to allow No. 74 Squadron, which had been designated as the new unit to operate the type, to be stood up. The squadron was declared operational on 31 December 1984.

The major difference between the F-4J and the British Phantoms was the absence of the Rolls-Royce Spey turbofan, the former being fitted with the General Electric J79-10B turbojet. Initially capable of carrying the AIM-7 Sparrow and AIM-9 Sidewinder air-to-air missiles (AAM), they were soon made compatible with the Skyflash (a British development of the Sparrow) and the SUU-23/A gun pod, largely bringing them into line with the rest of the RAF's Phantoms. Despite modifications to allow them to operate with the rest of the fleet, the F-4Js retained the vast bulk of the equipment they were originally fitted with, even requiring their crews to use American flying helmets. Much of this US equipment was eventually replaced when the fleet went through a refurbishment in 1989. As part of their initial refurbishment in 1983, the airframes also underwent painting – at the time, the RAF's interceptor force was being repainted in the air superiority grey colour that had been first used in 1978. The paint shop at the NARF was unable to replicate the barley grey colour, with the closest available in the US Navy's stores being a shade known as "flint grey". Two airframes received colour schemes close to the requirement, but the majority ended with a different variation of the attempted colour scheme, which resembled a pale blue / duck-egg green in certain conditions.

The new Phantoms were assigned a British designation as the F-4J(UK). The F.3 designation for the new Phantom had been discussed very early during the procurement process, however this was quickly dismissed to avoid confusion with the incoming Tornado F.3. Upon being declared operational, No. 74 Squadron remained stationed at RAF Wattisham, with its F-4J(UK) aircraft forming part of the UK's QRA force for the southern air defence identification zone alongside F-4M Phantoms of No. 56 Squadron. When acquired, the 15 airframes were expected to have a five-year service lifespan; ultimately the F-4J(UK) was retained for seven years. In 1990, thanks to the conversion of F-4M squadrons to the Tornado, the RAF was able to transfer the best of its remaining FGR.2s to No. 74 Squadron, which led to the F-4J(UK) being withdrawn in January 1991. One of the last major tasks for the F-4J(UK) came in August 1990, when No. 74 Squadron provided aircraft to operate as adversaries for Tornado strike aircraft undertaking dissimilar air combat training prior to their deployment as part of Operation Granby. A total of two complete Phantom F-4J(UK) airframes have survived following the type's withdrawal.

== Differences ==
=== Between the FG.1 and FGR.2 ===
The Phantom FG.1 and FGR.2 as built were similar, being fitted with broadly the same turbofan jet engines and avionics, although there were minor differences. The FG.1 was initially fitted with the Mark 201 version of the Rolls-Royce Spey, while the FGR.2 had the Mark 202; the Mark 201 had an unacceptable time lag between throttle movement and engine response, which was remedied in the 202. The 201 was eventually upgraded to the Mark 203 version, which had a modified control system for the afterburner, allowing it to light faster and enable power to be applied quickly in the event of a bolter on the small decks of the RN's aircraft carriers. Both variants were fitted with a version of the same avionics package; the FG.1 was fitted with the AN/AWG-11, which differed primarily in having a nose radome that was hinged and able to fold backward against the aircraft's fuselage to allow for storage in the hangar of an aircraft carrier, (Note: On 3 June 1980, a Phantom FG.1 of No. 111 Squadron crashed as a result of the nose swinging open in flight, due to failure of the latches securing the radome.) and was designed to be integrated with both the AGM-12 Bullpup missile and the WE.177 free-fall nuclear weapon as required. (Note: The Phantom exclusively used US weapons in the tactical nuclear strike role. Although work was done to determine the modifications needed to allow RAF Phantoms to carry the British WE.177 weapon, and flight trials were carried out to test its compatibility, it was moved to the air defence role before any major work was done to integrate the combination. RN Phantoms were not generally utilised as nuclear strike platforms; this role was carried out in the Fleet Air Arm by WE.177 armed Buccaneers.) (Note: The fire control systems fitted to the UK's Phantoms each utilised a different radar - the AN/AWG-10B fitted to the F-4J(UK) used the AN/APG-59; the AN/AWG-11 of the F-4K used the AN/APG-60; and the AN/AWG-12 of the F-4M used the AN/APG-61.) Meanwhile, the AN/AWG-12 fitted to the FGR.2 did not need a folding radome. It had a better ground-mapping mode, to take into account the strike role for which the type was originally intended, combined with a Ferranti inertial navigation/attack system (removed when the type converted to the air defence role). As the FGR.2 had to undertake the tactical reconnaissance mission, 30 airframes were wired to allow carriage of the reconnaissance pod developed by EMI. It was also configured to be able to control the SUU-23/A gun pod; FG.1s used by the RAF were also able to use the gun pod, but the RN's FG.1s lacked this capability.

=== Between British Phantoms and other Phantoms ===
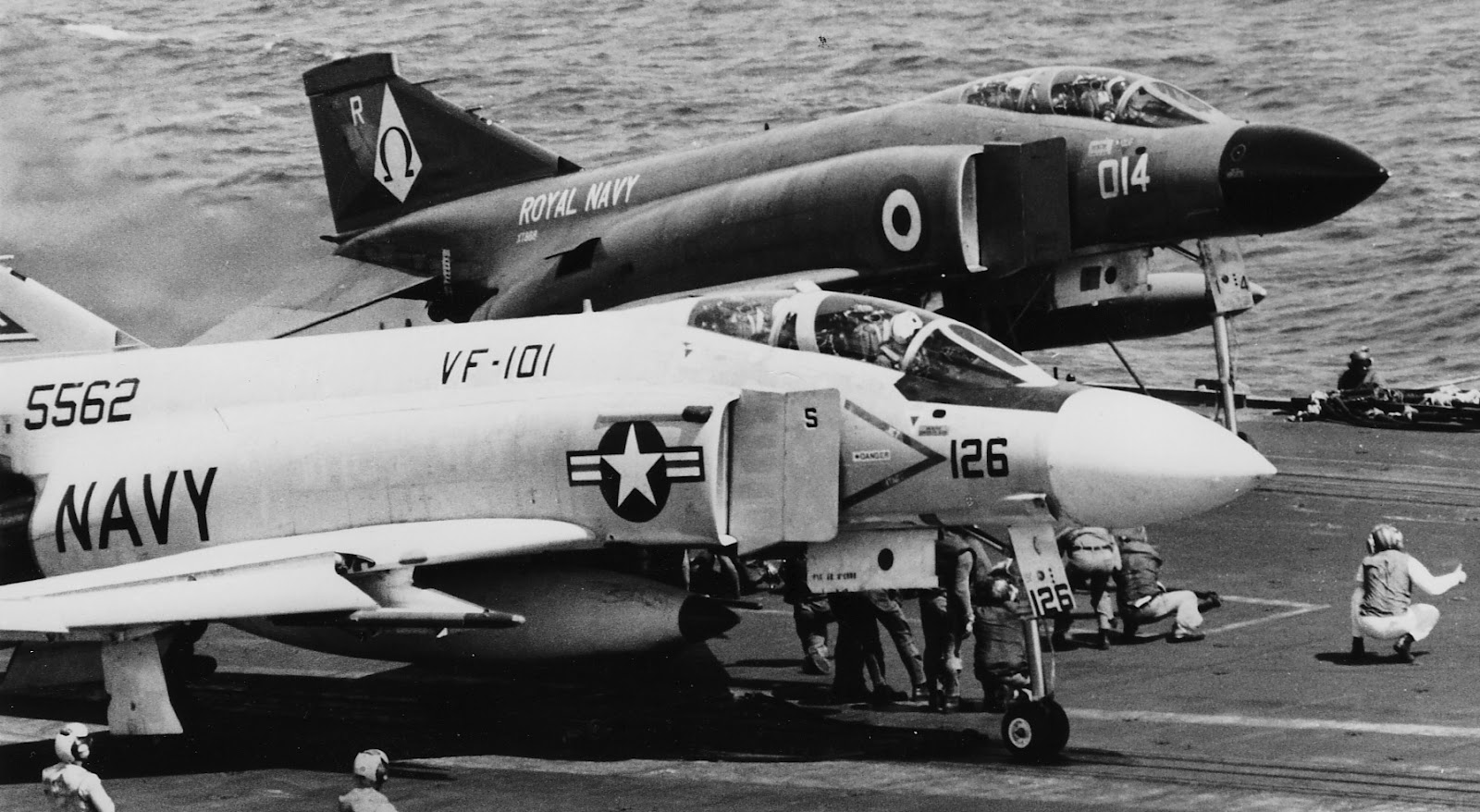
An F-4K of 892 NAS (background) alongside a US Navy F-4J of VF-101 (foreground). This shows the extended nosewheel oleo of the British aircraft, fitted to increase the take-off attitude for operation on the RN's carriers.

Although there were only minor variations between the two types of Phantom built for the UK, there were many significant differences between the British Phantoms and those built for the United States. The most obvious was the use of the Rolls-Royce Spey turbofan in place of the General Electric J79 turbojet. The Spey was shorter but wider than the J79, which meant that the British Phantoms' rear fuselage had to be widened by 152 millimetres (6 inches). The position of the afterburner also meant that the rear of the fuselage had to be made deeper. Furthermore, the engine had higher mass flow rates, which required the intakes to be enlarged by 20% and led to a consequent increase in drag. To further increase airflow at lower speeds, auxiliary intake doors were fitted on the rear fuselage. Performance estimates of the British Phantom compared to its American equivalent indicated that the former had a 30% shorter take-off distance, 20% faster climb to altitude, higher top speed, and longer range. The Spey was more efficient at lower altitudes and had better acceleration at low speed, giving British Phantoms better range and acceleration. The engine's superiority in these areas was shown during the deployment of 892 NAS to the Mediterranean aboard USS Saratoga in 1969, when the F-4K was repeatedly quicker off the deck than the F-4J used by the Americans. Conversely, it was less efficient at higher altitudes; the British Phantoms lacked speed compared to J79-powered versions, owing to the increased drag of the redesigned fuselage. This discrepancy became apparent when the F-4J was obtained by the UK in 1984; it was regarded as being the best of the three variants to serve in the RAF.

The small size of the aircraft carriers HMS Eagle and HMS Ark Royal, compared to the USN carriers of the period, meant that the F-4K version required significant structural changes compared to the F-4J, from which it was descended and which performed a similar role. As well as the folding nose radome to allow for storage in the smaller hangars of the British ships, (Note: The two aircraft lifts on Ark Royal measured 54 ft (16 m) × 44 ft (13 m) and 54 ft (16 m) × 33 ft (10 m). A Phantom with its nose radome folded back and wings folded was 51.6 ft (15.7 m) long and 27.5 ft (8.4 m) wide. This provided a clearance of 27.4 in (70 cm) along the aircraft length when being moved to and from the flight deck and hangar.) a significantly strengthened undercarriage was needed, to account for higher landing weights (British policy was to bring back unused ordnance). While the F-4J featured a nosewheel oleo that extended by 20 inches (51 centimetres) to provide the correct take-off attitude for launch from American catapults, the F-4K's nosewheel oleo extended by 40 inches (100 centimetres) to provide the required 9° take-off attitude from shorter and less powerful British catapults. (Note: Both Eagle and Ark Royal were fitted with a pair of BS5 catapults – the bow catapult had a stroke length of 151 feet, and could accelerate a 50,000lb load to 91 knots, while the waist catapult, which was 199 feet, could produce 105 knots for a 50,000lb load. By contrast, the contemporary Forrestal-class was fitted with C-7 type catapults, with a 253 feet stroke length, and capable of generating 116 knots for a 70,000lb load.) (Note: By contrast, the Buccaneer, which was operated from Ark Royal at the same time as the Phantom, was pulled down onto its tail skid when under tension on the catapult to achieve the requisite 11° attitude.) The F-4K was also fitted with drooping ailerons, enlarged leading edge flaps, a slotted tailplane, and increased flap and leading edge blowing, all to improve the lift and handling characteristics of the aircraft during operation from the much smaller carriers of the Royal Navy.

As the Phantom continued in service, other changes were made, most notably the addition of the Marconi ARI.18228 Radar Warning Receiver (RWR), which was fitted to the top of the vertical stabiliser of FG.1 and FGR.2 Phantoms in the mid-1970s, but not to the F-4J(UK), which retained its original RWR in fairings on the leading edges of the wings. The F-4J(UK) also retained its original AN/AWG-10 fire control system, which was upgraded to AN/AWG-10B standard as part of the package; included in the upgraded system was an improved digital computer that provided enhanced search and tracking capabilities that proved superior to the analogue computer fitted to the derived AN/AWG-11 and AN/AWG-12 units in the FG.1 and FGR.2. This made both the search and tracking modes in the F-4J(UK) clearer and more reliable compared to other UK Phantoms. From 1978, the Skyflash AAM, derived from the AIM-7 Sparrow, began to be delivered to RAF Phantom units. All three UK Phantom variants were eventually fitted to operate the Skyflash and the SUU-23/A gun pod. Phantom squadrons used Skyflash concurrently with the Sparrow, with the RAF's stocks of Sparrows used up as the Phantom approached its out-of-service date. (Note: The Tornado was not equipped to use the Sparrow, and so used Skyflash exclusively.)

== Aircraft production ==
The first UK Phantom order was placed in September 1964, when McDonnell received the contract for two YF-4K prototypes and two FG.1 pre-production airframes. Major orders were placed in July 1965 for a total of 60 airframes (2 × YF-4M prototypes, 20 × FG.1, 38 × FGR.2) and October 1966 for 159 airframes (35 × FG.1, 124 × FGR.2). Subsequent to the orders being placed, a total of seven FG.1s and 46 FGR.2s were cancelled.

Construction of the UK's Phantom fleet began with the test examples – two FG.1 prototypes and two FGR. 2 prototypes, plus a pair of pre-production FG.1 airframes – being rolled out during 1966 and early 1967. The initial production model flew for the first time on 18 September 1967. On 29 April 1968, the first three FG.1s were delivered to RNAS Yeovilton. The first FGR.2 arrived on 18 July 1968, with deliveries continuing throughout 1968 and 1969. The final Spey-powered Phantom to be delivered, an FGR.2, arrived at the end of October 1969. Of the units originally earmarked to operate the Phantom, No. 41 Squadron was the final one to be stood up when it was formed in April 1972. The fifteen F-4J(UK) aircraft formed part of an overall total of 522 F-4J Phantoms that were delivered to the US Navy and US Marine Corps. The selected airframes proved to be a mix of examples that had spent their entire service in the United States, including one that had served its entire career with VX-4 (one of the US Navy's test squadrons), and aircraft that had seen combat during the Vietnam War. The first three F-4J(UK)`s arrived at RAF Wattisham on 30 August 1984, with the final examples delivered in January 1985.

The first batch of F-4 Phantoms produced for the UK received military serial registrations in the XT range, with a total of 44 production models (20 × FG.1 and 24 × FGR.2) plus the four prototypes and two pre-production models, as well as one of the three sets of cancelled airframes (14 × FGR.2) being given XT serial numbers. The bulk of the UK's specially built Phantoms (28 × FG.1 and 94 × FGR.2) as well as the remaining two cancelled sets of airframes (7 × FG.1 and 32 × FGR.2) received XV numbers. The second-hand examples (15 × F-4J(UK)) obtained in 1984 received serials in the ZE range.

=== Other UK Phantom proposals ===
Although the Phantom was ordered in 1966, the variants that were eventually constructed were not the first to be offered to the UK. McDonnell Aircraft had been conducting studies into the possibility of the RN using the Phantom on its carriers since 1959. (Note: McDonnell also offered the Phantom as an option when France began looking for a high-performance carrier-based interceptor for its new Clemenceau-class aircraft carriers. Due to the size of the new carriers, the Phantom was rejected in favour of an adapted version of the smaller Vought F-8 Crusader.)

==== Other proposed Spey-powered Phantoms ====
McDonnell concluded that more power was needed than the J79 turbojet could provide to operate from the smaller decks of British carriers and, as a result, consulted Rolls-Royce about whether the RB-168 Spey turbofan, then in development for use in the Blackburn Buccaneer, could be fitted to the aircraft. (Note: The Spey was originally developed as an engine for mid-sized airliners including the BAC One-Eleven and Hawker Siddeley Trident. A military version was subsequently proposed to replace the underpowered de Havilland Gyron Junior turbojet engine fitted to the Buccaneer S.1.) In 1960, McDonnell approached the RAF with model numbers 98CJ and 98CM, which were variants of the F4H-1 (later F-4B) with modifications, including the installation of the Spey Mk.101 turbofan. McDonnell also continued studies, proposing afterburning Mk.101 engines in 1962, and trials of an F-4B fitted with an extendable nosewheel oleo, which took place aboard USS Forrestal in 1963. The same year, McDonnell proposed several Spey-powered F-4B derivatives, all featuring the extendable nosewheel oleo – model number 98ER was the basic version, model number 98ES had drooping ailerons, and model number 98ET had a revised wing design with higher lift properties. In 1964, the company proposed the model 98FC, which was identical to the F-4D variant but would have been fitted with the RB.168-25R. (Note: The RB.168-25R was the internal name given by Rolls-Royce to the Mark 201–203 versions of the Spey.)

==== Variable-geometry Phantom ====
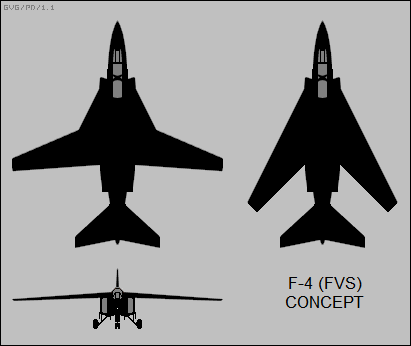
In the mid-1960s, McDonnell Douglas proposed a variable-geometry version of the Phantom, which was offered as a potential Phantom replacement.

In 1966, McDonnell released a proposal for a variable-geometry (VG) version of the Phantom. This was intended as McDonnell's submission for the Naval Fighter Experimental competition, which was started to find a replacement for the failed F-111B project as a new fleet air defence fighter for the US Navy. This was unsuccessful, with the aircraft that ultimately became the F-14 Tomcat selected. The company persisted with its vision of a VG Phantom, which included a version that was offered to the RAF as a potential alternative to the AFVG aircraft then under development in a partnership between the UK and France. (Note: The AFVG (Anglo-French Variable Geometry) was planned as a collaborative project to develop a platform to operate as an interceptor, tactical strike, and reconnaissance aircraft for the RAF, and as a carrier-based multi-role fighter for the Aéronavale.) The VG Phantom concept shared a significant amount of commonality with the UK's versions of the Phantom, including the use of the Rolls-Royce Spey engine, but the proposal was ultimately rejected as not offering sufficient increase in capability over the AFVG. The idea was resurrected when the RAF was looking to replace both the existing variants of the Phantom, as well as the Lightning, in the early 1970s – by this time the AFVG had been cancelled, but the new Multi-Role Combat Aircraft (MRCA) was under development. (Note: The MRCA was a tri-national project developed by the UK, Germany and Italy.) The lack of appreciable improvement in performance, combined with the potential that the MRCA development might be affected, nevertheless saw the proposal rejected a second time.

==== RF-4M ====
A further proposal came while the order for the F-4M was being finalised, and was a result of the UK's need for an aircraft to perform the tactical reconnaissance role. Both the US Marine Corps (RF-4B) and the US Air Force (RF-4C) operated dedicated reconnaissance versions of the Phantom. Neither of these was a viable option for the UK, due to cost issues, so McDonnell instead offered two options:

- The standard F-4M fitted with a reconnaissance pod in place of the centreline external fuel tank;
- A modified airframe, designated as RF-4M, with the reconnaissance equipment carried internally.

The RF-4M would have been a dedicated reconnaissance version, with a 2.65 feet (0.81 m) plug added to the nose radome to house the camera installation, compared to the 4.9 feet (1.5 m) extension to the RF-4B and RF-4C. (Note: The camera installation plug would have featured a total of five cameras.) The RF-4M would have had some advantages, primarily in that it would have had greater range, as it would have been able to carry a centreline fuel tank. But it was discounted as the cost would have been higher, with consequently fewer aircraft purchased, and only those that had been modified would have been able to undertake the reconnaissance mission. The installed reconnaissance equipment would have required the removal of the fire control system for the AIM-7 Sparrow missile, reducing the general capabilities of the aircraft. Ultimately the RAF chose the standard F-4M and external pod, which allowed all of its aircraft to perform all designated roles. (Note: The 30 Phantoms that were specifically wired to use the reconnaissance pod were exclusively distributed to the RAF's two tactical reconnaissance squadrons.)

==== F-4(HL) ====
Another McDonnell proposal was a variation of the carrier-based Phantom, with the goals of improving catapult performance and lowering approach speeds. The F-4(HL), also known as Model 98HL, was planned as a Spey-powered aircraft with a longer fuselage and wingspan, less sweep, stabilators with increased area, and air intakes with auxiliary blow-in doors to increase airflow at low speeds. This proposal was not taken forward.

== Replacement ==
=== Panavia Tornado ===
In the early 1970s, the RAF issued an Air Staff requirement (ASR) for the development of a new interceptor intended to replace both the Phantom and the Lightning. An early proposal was McDonnell Douglas's plan for a variable-geometry Phantom, which was ultimately rejected. An alternative idea was to take the MRCA, which evolved into the Panavia Tornado, and develop an interceptor version. The UK's partners in the MRCA project displayed no enthusiasm for this air defence version of the Tornado, so the UK alone began the process, and the authorisation for what came to be known as the Tornado Air Defence Variant (ADV) was issued in March 1976. (Note: Although the UK was the only MRCA partner nation involved in the development of the ADV, Italy also operated the aircraft between 1995 and 2003 when it leased a total of 24 Tornado F.3s from the UK to bolster its interceptor force prior to the introduction of the Eurofighter Typhoon.) The initial plan was for the Tornado to replace the remaining two squadrons of Lightnings, as well as all seven squadrons of Phantoms. (Note: At the time of the instigation of the Tornado project in the late 1970s, the RAF had seven squadrons of Phantoms in service – No. 74 Squadron was formed in 1984.)

While the Tornado was in development, the RAF looked at interim measures to replace the Phantom, which had been in service for over a decade by 1980 and was beginning to suffer from fatigue issues; one proposal was the lease or purchase of sufficient McDonnell Douglas F-15 Eagles to re-equip No. 19 and No. 92 Squadrons, the units stationed in Germany. Alternative proposals were that up to 80 F-15s be could replace the Phantom and Lightning squadrons then in service, and even that the Tornado be cancelled entirely and the F-15 be purchased with UK adaptations (specifically fitting of the AI.24 Foxhunter radar developed for the Tornado, and the Skyflash air-to-air missile).

In the end, the F-15 option was not seriously considered, as it was felt there would not be time or cost savings over the Tornado ADV. (Note: The F-15 was primarily designed as an air superiority fighter rather than a long-range interceptor, which was one of the RAF's basic requirements for an aircraft to replace the Phantom. The AI.24 radar planned for the Tornado was seen as having a high resistance to jamming, but fitting it to the F-15 would see the cost per aircraft come to a similar level as that of the Tornado, negating any potential cost benefit of procuring the American aircraft. The F-15 was an aircraft used by the US Air Force, meaning that aerial refuelling was by the flying boom method, while the RAF exclusively used the probe and drogue method for air-to-air refuelling.) The Tornado ultimately replaced the Phantom in four squadrons – the two FG.1 units, plus two FGR.2 units (No. 23 and No. 29 Squadrons) – while two squadrons stationed in the UK (No. 56 and No. 74 Squadrons) and two stationed in Germany (No. 19 and No. 92 Squadrons) retained the Phantom.

=== BAe Sea Harrier ===
In the 1970s, the RN was developing what was known as the 'through-deck cruiser', a 20,000-ton ship with a full-length flight deck intended to embark a squadron of large anti-submarine warfare helicopters. Almost as soon as the first ship, HMS Invincible, was ordered, another specification was added to the design: as well as the helicopters, a small squadron of Short Take-Off and Vertical Landing (STOVL) aircraft would form part of the air group to act as a deterrent to long-range reconnaissance aircraft. This concept initially dated back to 1963, when the prototype Hawker Siddeley P.1127 STOVL aircraft undertook initial landings aboard HMS Ark Royal. Three years later, a pre-production Hawker Siddeley Kestrel (which later became the Harrier) conducted a series of extensive trials from HMS Bulwark, which proved the concept of using vertical landing aircraft aboard carriers. As a result, a navalised version of the Harrier was developed. Over the total period of its design process, the air defence role of the new aircraft, which was given the name Sea Harrier, was augmented by responsibility for reconnaissance and maritime strike missions. In June 1979, 700A NAS was formed as the Sea Harrier IFTU, undertaking the aircraft's trials programme for nine months. In March 1980, 14 months after 892 NAS was decommissioned and its Phantoms handed over to the RAF, 700A NAS was disbanded and reformed as 899 NAS, the new Sea Harrier training squadron. A second unit, 800 NAS, was formed at the same time, embarking in Invincible as the Fleet Air Arm's first operational Sea Harrier squadron. (Note: The Fleet Air Arm commissioned a total of three operational Sea Harrier squadrons — 800 NAS and 801 NAS were the two originally planned units. The third was 809 NAS, which had previously served as the Buccaneer squadron aboard Ark Royal alongside the Phantoms of 892 NAS. 809 NAS was formed in April 1982 to reinforce the two existing Sea Harrier squadrons during the Falklands War.) (Note: Hermes had been proposed as one of the platforms to operate the Phantom, but had been converted into a helicopter only commando carrier between 1971 and 1973. During the ship's 1980-81 refit, Hermes received facilities to allow the operation of the Sea Harrier, enabling fixed-wing aircraft to form part of the ship's air group for the first time in a decade. This saw 800 NAS embarking in Hermes in June 1981, with the newly formed 801 NAS taking its place in Invincible.)

=== Aircraft that were replaced by and replaced the Phantom ===
Sir Sydney Camm, the Chief Designer at Hawker for many years, once said that no British aircraft could be considered a success until it was able to match the capabilities of the Phantom. In the RAF and RN, it was the direct replacement for four different aircraft types, across nine variants, in fifteen squadrons. (Note: There were a total of 16 front-line squadrons to operate the Phantom. The remaining unit, No. 74 Squadron, disbanded as a Lightning squadron in 1971 and was reformed 13 years later on the Phantom.) In turn, the Phantom was replaced by three different aircraft in thirteen squadrons in the RAF and RN. (Note: Following the withdrawal of the Phantom, the identities of the final four squadrons were transferred to reserve units – No. 56 Squadron became the shadow squadron number of No. 229 OCU, the Tornado F.3 Operational Conversion Unit, while No. 19 Squadron, No. 74 Squadron and No. 92 Squadron were adopted by the flying squadrons of No. 4 and No. 7 Flying Training Schools operating the Hawk T.1A in the advanced training and tactical weapons training roles.)

| Role | Aircraft replaced by Phantom | Total number of squadrons | Date | Aircraft replacing Phantom | Total number of squadrons | Date |
|---|---|---|---|---|---|---|
| Fleet air defence | Sea Vixen FAW.2 | one | 1969 | Sea Harrier FRS.1 (Note: Following the decommissioning of Ark Royal in 1978, the RN was no longer able to operate conventional fixed wing aircraft at sea. The Sea Harrier was introduced into both the air defence (replacing the Phantom) and strike (replacing the Buccaneer) roles in the Fleet Air Arm with 800 NAS and 801 NAS in 1980.) | two | 1980 |
| Tactical reconnaissance | Hunter FR.10 | one (Note: The second Phantom reconnaissance squadron was formed in 1972, having previously been a Bloodhound surface-to-air missile squadron.) | 1970 | Jaguar GR.1 | seven | 1976 |
| Tactical reconnaissance | Canberra PR.7 | two (Note: The two Canberra reconnaissance squadrons were reformed on the Phantom as close air support units.) | 1970 | Jaguar GR.1 | seven | 1976 |
| Close air support / Tactical strike | Canberra B.16 | one | 1969 | Jaguar GR.1 | seven | 1974 |
| Close air support / Tactical strike | Canberra B(I).8 | one | 1970 | Jaguar GR.1 | seven | 1974 |
| Close air support / Tactical strike | Hunter FGA.9 | two (Note: One of the close air support Hunter squadrons was reformed on the Phantom in the air defence role.) | 1969 | Jaguar GR.1 | seven | 1974 |
| Air defence | Lightning F.2A | two | 1977 | Tornado F.3 | four | 1987 |
| Air defence | Lightning F.3 | five | 1974 | Tornado F.3 | four | 1987 |
| Air defence | Lightning F.6 | five | 1974 | Tornado F.3 | four | 1987 |

== Aircraft on display ==
Preserved UK Phantoms

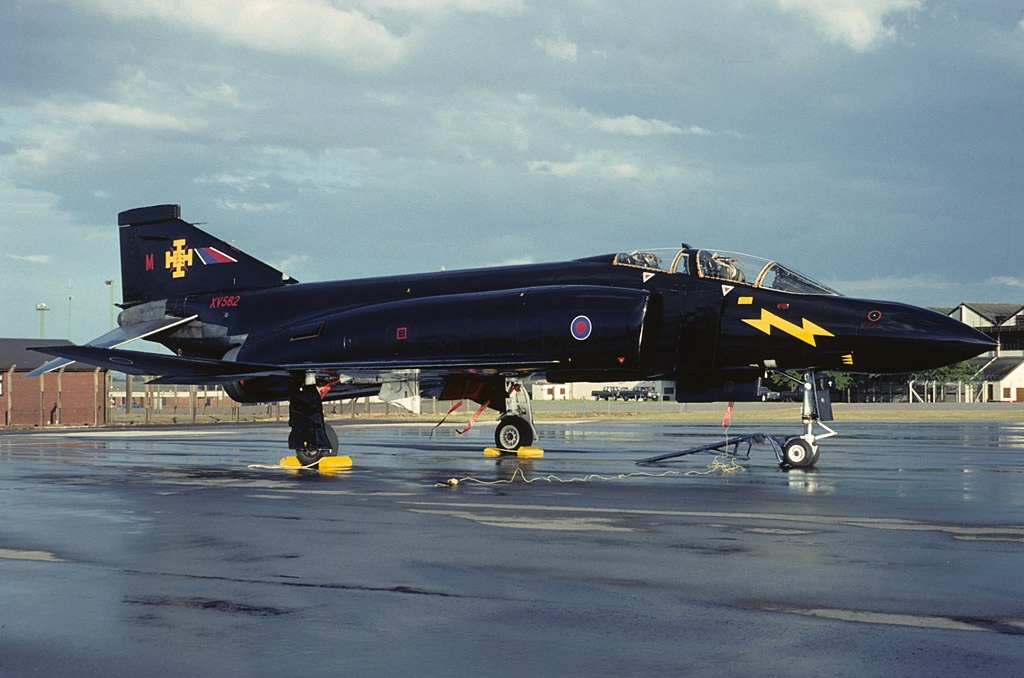
Phantom FG.1, XV582 in 1990

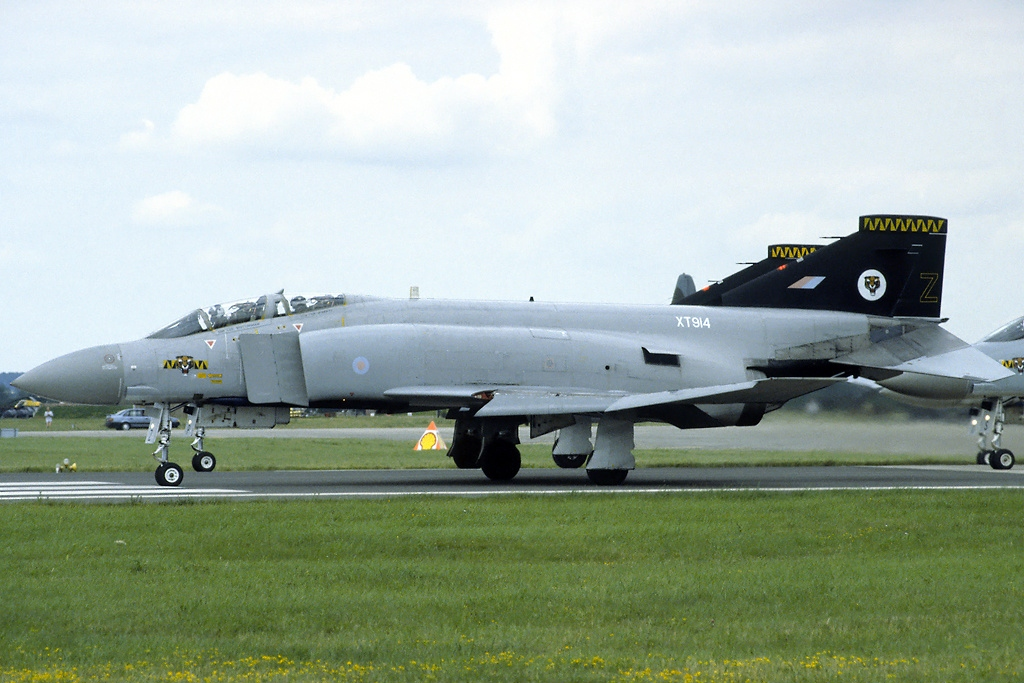
Phantom FGR.2, XT914 in 1991

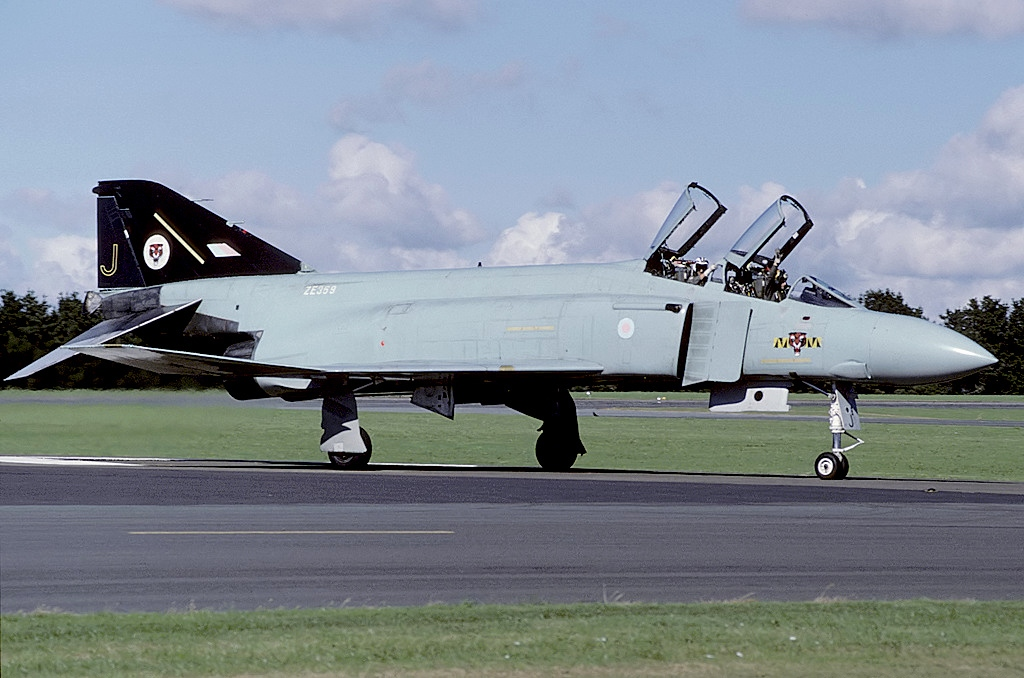
Phantom F.3, ZE359 in 1987

The below list details the aircraft that are still complete following the final retirement of the Phantom, none of which are in flying condition. Some airframes had their nose sections, containing cockpits, saved following disposal.

YF-4K (prototype)

- XT596 — Fleet Air Arm Museum, RNAS Yeovilton, Somerset, England.

FG.1

- XT597 — British Phantom Aviation Group, Kemble, Gloucestershire, England. (Note: Under restoration; not on public display)
- XT864 — Ulster Aviation Society, Maze-Long Kesh, Lisburn, Northern Ireland.
- XV582 — South Wales Aviation Museum, St Athan, Wales.
- XV586 — RNAS Yeovilton, Somerset, England. (Note: Stored not on display)

FGR.2

- XT891 — RAF Coningsby, Lincolnshire, England. (Note: Serving as gate guardian)
- XT899 — Kbely Museum, Czech Republic.
- XT905 — British Phantom Aviation Group, Kemble, Gloucestershire, England.
- XT914 — Wattisham Airfield, Suffolk, England.
- XV401 — Bentwaters Cold War Museum, Woodbridge, Suffolk, England.
- XV406 — Solway Aviation Museum, Carlisle Airport, Cumbria, England.
- XV408 — Tangmere Military Aviation Museum, West Sussex, England.
- XV415 — RAF Boulmer, Alnwick, Northumberland, England.
- XV424 — Royal Air Force Museum London, Colindale, London, England.
- XV470 — RAF Akrotiri, Cyprus.
- XV474 — Imperial War Museum Duxford, Cambridgeshire, England.
- XV497 — Norfolk and Suffolk Aviation Museum, Flixton, Suffolk, England.

F-4J(UK)

- ZE359 — American Air Museum, Imperial War Museum Duxford, Cambridgeshire, England. (Note: Painted in USN VF-74 Squadron markings)
- ZE360 — British Phantom Aviation Group, Kemble, Gloucestershire, England.

In October 2019, the British Phantom Aviation Group (BPAG) announced that, in partnership with the 74(F) Squadron Association, it had obtained ZE360, a Phantom Phantom F-4J(UK) stored at the former Defence Fire Training and Development Centre at Manston in Kent. The BPAG plans to restore this aircraft, one of only two remaining complete examples of the F-4J(UK), and return it to its original RAF markings. ZE360 was one of three complete airframes owned by the BPAG – the group also obtained XT905, an FGR.2 that had been used as a training aid at North Luffenham in Rutland until 2013, and XT597, one of the two pre-production FG.1 aircraft, which was used for its entire career by the A&AEE. By late 2024, all three airframes in the BPAG's collection had been moved to the group's new facility at Cotswold Airport in Gloucestershire, with a long-term plan to restore all three for display.

== Accidents and incidents ==
| Country | Variant | | | Ref. |
| Country | FG.1 | FGR.2 | F-4J(UK) | Ref. |
|---|---|---|---|---|
| United Kingdom | 13 | 18 | 1 | |
| Germany (Note: Includes West Germany) | —N/a | 7 | —N/a | |
| Falkland Islands | —N/a | 2 | —N/a | |
| Netherlands | —N/a | 2 | —N/a | |
| Cyprus | —N/a | 1 | —N/a | |
| Denmark | —N/a | 1 | —N/a | |
| France | —N/a | 1 | —N/a | |
| United States | 1 | —N/a | —N/a | |
Aircraft lost in the UK
| England | 4 | 16 | —N/a | |
| Scotland | 9 | 2 | —N/a | |
| Wales | —N/a | —N/a | 1 | |

Between 1968 and 1992, a total of 55 Phantoms operated by the Fleet Air Arm and the RAF were written off, with 47 of these involved in crashes. These crashes took place in eight different countries and territories (see table) with the majority in the United Kingdom. The most crashes were among the FGR.2 variant (32), which included 14 outside the UK. A total of 14 FG.1s were lost to crashes while in service with both the Fleet Air Arm (7) and the RAF (7), with 13 of these incidents occurring in the UK. (Note: One of the Fleet Air Arm aircraft lost was on loan to the A&AEE for flight deck trials on Ark Royal following her refit.) During its use by the RAF, only one of the 15 F-4J(UK)`s was lost to a crash. Of the aircraft crashes, a total of 39 people were killed, with three civilians losing their lives and 36 aircrew.

As well as the 47 aircraft lost to crashes, another 8 were written off due to other incidents. Two incidents occurred when aircraft overran the runway upon landing, with it deemed uneconomical to repair them. Between 1990 and 1992, three aircraft suffered relatively minor damage in different incidents that, owing to the approaching withdrawal of the Phantom from service, it was decided was not worth repairing. Another three aircraft caught fire in various incidents, with two completely burned out, and a third not repaired owing to the imminent retirement of the Phantom.

As well as incidents that saw aircraft written off, there were many others that involved the Phantom, some which saw damage to a Phantom that was repaired, others which involved other aircraft:

- 9 November 1970 – A pair of Phantom FG.1s of 892 NAS were being launched from Ark Royal on a combat air patrol during Exercise LIME JUG in the Mediterranean. Having successfully launched the first aircraft, the second had engaged full power and, with the catapult under tension, was ready to be launched when the order came to hold before the launch was scrubbed altogether, requiring the catapult and engines to be wound down and made safe. The cause of the scrub turned out to be that Ark Royal had collided with the Soviet Navy Kotlin-class destroyer Bravyy, which led to the first Phantom launched having to be diverted to Malta.
- 8 August 1973 – Phantom FGR.2s of No. 41 Squadron were en route to Dubai as part of the Exercise BERSATU PADU deployment to the Far East. The distance meant that aerial refueling was required, and so the Phantoms were accompanied by tankers. Although there had been a number of successful hook-ups for refueling, an incident occurred during a refueling bracket that saw the hose jam and tear the refueling probe out of one Phantom. Now unable to receive fuel, the Phantom was forced to divert to RAF Akrotiri. Having landed safely, the Phantom crew were then ferried on a VC-10 flight to catch up with the rest of their squadron at RSAF Tengah in Singapore.
- 9 August 1974 – A Phantom FGR.2 of No. 41 Squadron had departed RAF Coningsby on a low-level reconnaissance and navigation flight. Following a standard low-level flying route for military aircraft, the Phantom was travelling at 420 kn (780 km/h) and was approximately 1 km (0.62 mi) from the village of Hilgay at around 300 feet, when it struck a Piper PA-25 Pawnee crop spraying aircraft. The crop spraying aircraft disintegrated, while the Phantom, on fire and shedding parts of its structure, remained airborne for another 1 km before crashing. Both the pilot of the crop spraying aircraft and the crew of the Phantom were killed. The subsequent inquiry concluded that the accident was a result of neither pilot seeing the other aircraft in time to avoid a collision, and recommended that the location of military low-flying routes be made available.
- 21 November 1977 – A Phantom FG.1 of No. 43 Squadron was part of a two-aircraft training sortie at RAF Leuchars. During its take-off run, as the speed increased past 100 kn (190 km/h), the pilot noticed that the aircraft was veering to the right. Despite applying left rudder, the Phantom continued to the right, which became more abrupt after passing 130 kn (240 km/h). Even with full left brakes and left rudder, plus the throttles moved back to abort the take-off, the aircraft swung off the runway. The aircraft came to a stop in the grass to the side of the runway, while the crew both ejected. An inquiry discovered that the cause of the problem was moisture in the nose wheel steering of the Phantom, which caused a short circuit that led to the nose wheel moving 70 degrees to the right.
- 3 June 1980 – A Phantom FG.1 of No. 111 Squadron had been detached from RAF Leuchars to RAF Alconbury for training. During a routine sortie, the aircraft was being lined up for landing when the nose radome was seen to open slightly, close, and open again before folding back against the fuselage. The sudden asymmetric drag led to roll and yaw to the right from which the pilot was not able to regain control. The crew ejected successfully, with the aircraft crashing in a field short of the runway. The investigation found a significant amount of wear on the mechanism that locked the radome in place during flight, a fault that was found throughout the FG.1 fleet. This led to modifications to the nose locking mechanism to prevent a similar incident.
- 22 October 1981 – A Phantom FGR.2 of No. 228 OCU was on an instructional flight at RAF Coningsby, with an instructor in the rear cockpit and a qualifying student in the front. Having lined up on finals, the crew found that the undercarriage's main wheels had deployed successfully, but the nose wheel had not. Despite protocol indicating that the aircraft should be taken out to sea to jettison the gun pod before attempting to land, the crew were ordered to jettison over the airfield. Having done so, the aircraft once again turned to line up for landing. The aircraft successfully touched down on the runway, coming to a stop resting on its nose, with no injuries to the crew. The cause of the malfunction was identified as a sheared bolt in the undercarriage preventing the deployment of the nosewheel.
- 25 May 1982 – A Phantom FGR.2 of No. 92 Squadron was part of an air defence exercise at RAF Wildenrath. As part of the exercise, the aircraft was scrambled to undertake a practice intercept of a pair of Jaguars from No. 14 Squadron. This was intended to involve the interceptor lining up for an attack, with the pilot then calling the brevity code for the weapon intended to be used. But, because the aircraft was part of Wildenrath's Quick Reaction Alert commitment that day, it was armed with live weapons, and an AIM-9G Sidewinder missile was inadvertently launched, destroying one of the Jaguars. Although the Jaguar pilot successfully ejected, the Phantom crew were ultimately held responsible for the incident and sent for court martial, where they received a severe reprimand. (Note: Five months after the shootdown incident, the Jaguar pilot was forced to eject a second time during a training flight from RAF Lossiemouth in which his aircraft caught fire.)
- 18 May 1988 – A Phantom F-4J(UK) of No. 74 Squadron was detached from RAF Wattisham to RAF Akrotiri for an Armament Practice Camp deployment. Lined up on the runway alongside a second Phantom for a training sortie, the aircraft began its take-off run as normal. As it reached V_{1} speed, the canopy of the forward cockpit detached itself from the airframe. The aircraft was too fast to abort the take-off, and had to remain airborne for 20 minutes while the runway was cleared of debris, before returning safely. The subsequent investigation showed that the canopy's locking system had failed.

== Variants ==
F-4J(UK)

- Former US Navy and US Marine Corps F-4J airframes refurbished with some F-4S standard upgrades with addition of some UK equipment; supplemented existing UK air defences following the Falklands War. Given British designation F-4J(UK). 15 produced.

F-4K

- UK-specific variant based on F-4J; designed primarily for use as carrier-based air defence interceptor with secondary strike role from Royal Navy aircraft carriers; also operated by Royal Air Force. Given British designation FG.1. 48 production models plus 2 pre-production test models built; 7 additional models cancelled.

F-4M

- UK-specific variant based on F-4J; designed initially for use as close air support and tactical reconnaissance aircraft for Royal Air Force; eventually transferred to air defence role and operated as interceptor. Given British designation FGR.2. 116 built; 44 additional models cancelled.

RF-4M

- Proposed specific variant of F-4M intended to fulfil tactical reconnaissance role; designed with integral camera installation in aircraft nose. Never built.

YF-4K

- Prototype version of F-4K primarily for development and testing of UK-specific features. 2 built.

YF-4M

- Prototype version of F-4M primarily for development and testing of UK-specific features. 2 built.

== Operators ==
FG.1

- Air defence
  - 892 Naval Air Squadron – Fleet Air Arm
  - No. 43 Squadron – RAF Strike Command
  - No. 111 Squadron (Note: No. 111 Squadron converted from the FGR.2 to the FG.1 in 1979.) – RAF Strike Command
- Training
  - 767 Naval Air Squadron (Note: 767 Naval Air Squadron was responsible for all FG.1 training for the Fleet Air Arm and the RAF from 1969 to 1972, when it was replaced by the RAF administered Phantom Training Flight.) – Operational Conversion Unit (Fleet Air Arm)
  - No. 64 (R) Squadron – Operational Conversion Unit (RAF)
  - Phantom Training Flight (Note: The original Phantom Training Flight operated as a dedicated FG.1 conversion unit from 1972 to 1978. The second was raised as part of No. 74 Squadron to operate FGR.2 refresher courses from 1991 to 1992.) – Operational Conversion Unit (RAF)
- Testing and evaluation
  - Aeroplane and Armament Experimental Establishment (A&AEE)
  - 700P Naval Air Squadron – Fleet Air Arm

FGR.2

- Close air support / tactical strike
  - No. 6 Squadron – RAF Strike Command
  - No. 14 Squadron – RAF Germany
  - No. 17 Squadron – RAF Germany
  - No. 31 Squadron – RAF Germany
  - No. 54 Squadron – RAF Strike Command
- Tactical reconnaissance
  - No. 2 Squadron – RAF Germany
  - No. 41 Squadron – RAF Strike Command
- Air defence
  - No. 19 Squadron – RAF Germany
  - No. 23 Squadron – RAF Strike Command
  - No. 29 Squadron – RAF Strike Command
  - No. 56 Squadron – RAF Strike Command
  - No. 74 Squadron (Note: No. 74 Squadron converted from the F.3 to the FGR.2 in 1991.) – RAF Strike Command
  - No. 92 Squadron – RAF Germany
  - No. 111 Squadron – RAF Strike Command
  - No. 1435 Flight – British Forces Falkland Islands
- Training
  - No. 64 (R) Squadron – Operational Conversion Unit
  - Phantom Training Flight – Refresher Training
- Testing and evaluation
  - Aeroplane and Armament Experimental Establishment (A&AEE)

F-4J(UK)

- Air defence
  - No. 74 Squadron – RAF Strike Command
- Testing and evaluation
  - Aeroplane and Armament Experimental Establishment (A&AEE)

== Specifications (F-4K) ==
Data from Aircraft of the Royal Navy since 1945; The Royal Navy Phantom II;

General characteristics

- Crew: 2
- Length: 57 ft 7 in (17.55 m)
- Wingspan: 38 ft 4.5 in (11.7 m)
- Height: 16 ft 1 in (4.9 m)
- Empty weight: 31,000 lb (14,061 kg)
- Max takeoff weight: 56,000 lb (25,402 kg)
- Fuel capacity: 2,790 imp gal (12,700 L) (Note: The F-4K was originally specified to be able to carry a total of 2790 gallons of fuel, comprising 1670 gallons internally, a 500-gallon external tank on the centreline pylon, and a 310-gallon external tank under each wing.)
- Powerplant: 2 × Rolls-Royce Spey 203 low bypass turbofans, 12,140 lbf (54.0 kN) thrust each dry, 20,500 lbf (91 kN) with afterburner

Performance

- Maximum speed: 1,386 mph (2,231 km/h, 1,204 kn) at 40,000 ft (12,190 m)
- Maximum speed: Mach 1.9
- Ferry range: 1,750 mi (2,816 km, 1,520 nmi)
- Service ceiling: 60,000 ft (18,300 m)

Armament

- Air defence
  - 4 × AIM-7 Sparrow or Skyflash in fuselage recesses plus 2 × Sparrow / Skyflash on underwing pylons and 4 × AIM-9 Sidewinders on underwing shoulder rails (Note: The standard weapon fit for QRA duties in the UK and the Falklands for all Phantom variants was generally four Sparrow / Skyflash using fuselage recesses and four Sidewinder on the shoulder rails, with fuel tanks under the centreline and wings. For aircraft deployed on "Battle Flight" (as QRA was referred to by RAF Germany) duties in Germany, the gun pod was carried in place of the centreline tank.) (Note: During the Phantom procurement process for the Fleet Air Arm, it was debated whether to purchase the Sidewinder, or use the existing Red Top missile, as the aircraft's secondary missile weapon. Red Top, which was already used by both the Sea Vixen in the Fleet Air Arm and the Lightning in the RAF, had a limited all-aspect capability. Using this would have required modifications to the Phantom's fire control system that were ruled out on cost grounds. Not modifying the Phantom's radar would have meant that Red Top would have had the same rear aspect, infrared homing capability as Sidewinder. Red Top was larger and heavier than Sidewinder, reducing endurance, and would have required the missile rails under the aircraft's wings to be modified to allow it to be carried. At £18,000 per missile, Red Top was six times more expensive than Sidewinder. As a result, Sidewinder was selected as the Phantom's short-range secondary missile.)
  - SUU-23/A gun pod on centreline pylon with up to 1,200 rounds (RAF aircraft only)
- Strike
  - Matra Type 116 rocket pods (RAF aircraft) or Microcell No. 7 rocket pods (Fleet Air Arm aircraft) (Note: Fleet Air Arm Phantoms were unable to use Matra rocket pods due to potential interference from high powered electronics aboard aircraft carriers accidentally discharging rockets. Microcell pods were equipped with electronic filters to prevent accidental discharge.)
  - Mix of 540 lb and 1000 lb free-fall or retarded bombs
  - BL755 cluster bombs
  - B28/B43/B57 tactical nuclear weapons

Avionics

- Ferranti AN/AWG-11 multi-mode fire control system incorporating AN/APG-60 doppler radar
- Marconi ARI18228 Radar Warning Receiver (Note: The addition of the RWR cap to the tail raised the aircraft's height to 16 ft 9 in (5.11 m).)
- Marconi AN/ASN-39A computer
- AN/ARN-91 TACAN bearing/distance navigation system
- Cossor IFF
- STR-70P radio altimeter

The F-4J(UK) as delivered had a different equipment fit to the rest of the UK's Phantoms and was longer, lighter, and faster at altitude. The FG.1 and FGR.2 were broadly identical, with the main difference being the ability of the FGR.2 to carry the dedicated reconnaissance pod built by EMI and containing the following:

- 2 × F.135 forward-facing camera
- 4 × F.95 oblique-facing camera
- Texas Instruments RS700 infra-red linescan
- MEL/EMI Q-Band sideways-looking reconnaissance radar

== Phantom bases ==
The RAF operated the Phantom from bases in the UK, Germany, and the Falkland Islands during its operational service, while the RN initially based its Phantom units at its main air station at RNAS Yeovilton; following the disbanding of the Fleet Air Arm's dedicated training squadron, its sole operational Phantom squadron was moved to the RAF's base at RAF Leuchars. The Phantom was also operated by the A&AEE from its base at Boscombe Down, with the final aircraft retired in January 1994.

Bases used by Phantom squadrons of the Royal Navy (RN) and Royal Air Force (RAF)
| Base | Years used | Number of squadrons | Location map |
Phantom bases in the United Kingdom
| RNAS Yeovilton | Apr 1968 – Sep 1972 | 3 × RN squadrons | McDonnell Douglas Phantom in UK service is located in the United Kingdom |
| RAF Leuchars | Sep 1969 – Jan 1990 | 1 × RN squadron | McDonnell Douglas Phantom in UK service is located in the United Kingdom |
| RAF Leuchars | Sep 1969 – Jan 1990 | 3 × RAF squadrons | McDonnell Douglas Phantom in UK service is located in the United Kingdom |
| RAF Leuchars | Sep 1969 – Jan 1990 | 1 × RAF flight | McDonnell Douglas Phantom in UK service is located in the United Kingdom |
| RAF Coningsby | May 1969 – Apr 1987 | 5 × RAF squadrons | McDonnell Douglas Phantom in UK service is located in the United Kingdom |
| RAF Wattisham | Nov 1975 – Sep 1992 | 3 × RAF squadrons | McDonnell Douglas Phantom in UK service is located in the United Kingdom |
| RAF Wattisham | Nov 1975 – Sep 1992 | 1 × RAF flight | McDonnell Douglas Phantom in UK service is located in the United Kingdom |
| A&AEE Boscombe Down | Nov 1968 – Jan 1994 | 2 × A&AEE squadrons | McDonnell Douglas Phantom in UK service is located in the United Kingdom |
Phantom bases in Germany (map displays North Rhine-Westphalia)
| RAF Laarbruch | Dec 1970 – Feb 1976 | 1 × RAF squadron | McDonnell Douglas Phantom in UK service is located in North Rhine-Westphalia |
| RAF Brüggen | Jun 1970 – Jun 1976 | 3 × RAF squadrons | McDonnell Douglas Phantom in UK service is located in North Rhine-Westphalia |
| RAF Wildenrath | Dec 1976 – Jan 1992 | 2 × RAF squadrons | McDonnell Douglas Phantom in UK service is located in North Rhine-Westphalia |
Phantom bases in the Falkland Islands
| RAF Stanley | Oct 1982 – May 1985 | 2 × RAF squadrons | McDonnell Douglas Phantom in UK service is located in Falkland Islands |
| RAF Mount Pleasant | May 1985 – Jun 1992 | 1 × RAF squadron | McDonnell Douglas Phantom in UK service is located in Falkland Islands |
| RAF Mount Pleasant | May 1985 – Jun 1992 | 1 × RAF flight | McDonnell Douglas Phantom in UK service is located in Falkland Islands |

== See also ==
- McDonnell Douglas F-4 Phantom II non-U.S. operators
- McDonnell Douglas F-4 Phantom II in Australian service

Related development

- McDonnell Douglas F-4J Phantom II

Aircraft of comparable role, configuration, and era

- British Aerospace Sea Harrier
- De Havilland Sea Vixen
- English Electric Canberra
- English Electric Lightning
- Hawker Hunter
- Mitsubishi F-15J Eagle
- McDonnell Douglas A-4G Skyhawk
- McDonnell Douglas CF-188 Hornet
- Panavia Tornado ADV
- Panavia Tornado IDS
- SEPECAT Jaguar
- Vought F-8E(FN) Crusader

Related lists

- List of fighter aircraft
- List of military aircraft of the United Kingdom
- List of McDonnell Douglas F-4 Phantom II variants

== Bibliography ==
- Archer, Bob (1992). "Sunset for the Phantom". RAF Yearbook. IAT Publishing: 13–15.
- Auten, Donald (2008). Roger Ball!: The Odyssey of John Monroe "Hawk" Smith Navy Fighter Pilot. Bloomington, Indiana: iUniverse. ISBN 978-1-60528-005-9.
- Baker, A.D. (1995). The Naval Institute Guide to Combat Fleets of the World 1995: Their Ships, Aircraft and Systems. Annapolis, Maryland: Naval Institute Press. ISBN 978-1-55750-109-7.
- Ballance, Theo; Howard, Lee; Sturtivant, Ray (2016). The Squadrons and Units of the Fleet Air Arm. Staplefield, West Sussex, UK: Air Britain Historians. ISBN 978-0-85130-489-2.
- Beedle, Jimmy (2011). The Fighting Cocks: 43 (Fighter) Squadron. Barnsley, UK: Pen & Sword Publishing. ISBN 978-1-84884-385-1.
- Benbow, Tim (2011). British Naval Aviation: The First 100 Years. Farnham, Surrey, UK: Ashgate Publishing. ISBN 978-1-40940-612-9.
- Blackman, Raymond, ed. (1967). Jane's Fighting Ships 1967–68. New York City: McGraw Hill.
- Blackman, Raymond, ed. (1972). Jane's Fighting Ships 1972–73. New York City: McGraw Hill.
- Burke, Damien (2010). TSR2: Britain's Lost Bomber. Marlborough, Wiltshire, UK: The Crowood Press. ISBN 978-1-84797-211-8.
- Buttler, Tony (2003). British Secret Projects: Jet Bombers Since 1949. Hinckley, UK: Midland Publishing. ISBN 978-1-85780-130-9.
- Bond, Steve (2020). Fleet Air Arm Boys: Air Defence Fighter Aircraft Since 1945: True Tales from Royal Navy Aircrew, Maintainers and Handlers, Volume 1. London, UK: Grub Street Publishing. ISBN 978-1-91162-198-0.
- Caygill, Peter (2005). Phantom from the Cockpit. Barnsley, UK: Casemate Publishers. ISBN 978-1-84415-225-4.
- Chant, Christopher (2013). A Compendium of Armaments and Military Hardware. Abingdon, UK: Routledge Revival. ISBN 978-0-41571-068-8.
- Critchley, Mike (1987). British Warships Since 1945: Part 1 – Major Ships. Liskeard, UK: Maritime Books. ISBN 978-0-95063-234-6.
- Darling, Kev (2012). RAF Strike Command 1968–2007: Aircraft, Men and Action. Barnsley, UK: Pen & Sword Aviation. ISBN 978-1-84884-898-6.
- Davies, Peter E. (2016). USN McDonnell Douglas F-4 Phantom II. Oxford, UK: Osprey Publishing. ISBN 978-1-47280-495-2.
- Davies, Peter E. (2013). USAF McDonnell Douglas F-4 Phantom II. Oxford, UK: Osprey Publishing. ISBN 978-1-78096-608-3.
- Dow, Andrew (2014). Pegasus - The Heart of the Harrier. Barnsley, UK: Pen & Sword. ISBN 978-1-47382-760-8.
- Ellis, Ken (2014). Wrecks and Relics (24th ed.). Manchester, England: Crecy Publishing. ISBN 978-0-85979-177-9.
- Friedman, Norman (1983). U.S. Aircraft Carriers: An Illustrated Design History. Annapolis, Maryland: United States Naval Institute. ISBN 978-0-87021-739-5.
- Gardiner, Robert, ed. (1983). Conway's All the World's Fighting Ships 1947–1982 Part 1: The Western Powers. London: Conway Maritime Press. ISBN 978-0-85177-225-7.
- Gledhill, David (2017). Phantom in the Cold War: RAF Wildenrath, 1977–1992. Barnsley, UK: Pen & Sword Books. ISBN 978-1-52670-408-5.
- Gledhill, David (2012). The Phantom in Focus: A Navigator's Eye on Britain's Cold War Warrior. Stroud, UK: Fonthill Media. ISBN 978-1-78155-048-9.
- Goodrum, Alastair (January–February 2004). "Down Range: Losses over the Wash in the 1960s and 1970s". Air Enthusiast (109): 12–17. ISSN 0143-5450.
- Gunston, Bill (2006). World Encyclopedia of Aero Engines (5th ed.). Phoenix Mill, Gloucestershire, England, UK: Sutton Publishing Limited. ISBN 978-0-75094-479-3.
- Hale, Julian (2018). The RAF 1918–2018. London, UK: Bloomsbury. ISBN 978-1-78442-244-8.
- Hampshire, Edward (2013). From East of Suez to the Eastern Atlantic: British Naval Policy 1964–70. Farnham, UK: Ashgate Publishing. ISBN 978-1-13827-134-0.
- Hayward, Keith (2018). "Making a Pig's Ear from a Silk Purse..? 'Anglicising' the McDonnell Douglas F-4 Phantom". The Aviation Historian (25): 54–63. ISSN 2051-1930.
- Hobbs, David (1992). Aircraft of the Royal Navy since 1945. Liskeard, UK: Maritime Books. ISBN 978-0-90777-106-7.
- Hobbs, David (2009). A Century of Carrier Aviation. Barnsley, UK: Seaforth Publishing. ISBN 978-1-84832-019-2.
- Hobbs, David (2013). British Aircraft Carriers: Design, Development & Service Histories. Barnsley, UK: Seaforth Publishing. ISBN 978-1-84832-138-0.
- Hobbs, David (2020). The British Carrier Strike Fleet: After 1945. Barnsley, UK: Pen & Sword. ISBN 978-1-52678-544-2.
- Jackson, Paul (1988). "Farewell Lightning, welcome Tornado". RAF Yearbook. Fairford, England: IAT Publishing: 57–62.
- Jordan, John (1983). An Illustrated Guide to Modern Naval Aviation and Aircraft Carriers. London: Salamander Books. ISBN 978-0-6680-5824-7.
- Lake, Jon (1992). Phantom Spirit in the Skies. London, UK: Aerospace Publishing. ISBN 978-1-880588-04-8.
- Macfadyen, Ian (1992). "Phantoms over the South Atlantic". RAF Yearbook. Leicester, England: IAT Publishing: 63–66.
- March, Peter R. (1998). Brace by Wire to Fly-By-Wire – 80 Years of the Royal Air Force 1918–1998. RAF Fairford: Royal Air Force Benevolent Fund Enterprises. ISBN 1-899808-06-X.
- Martin, Patrick (2012). British Phantoms: The Phantom FG Mk.1 and FGR Mk.2 in Royal Navy and RAF Service 1966–1978. Erlangen: Double Ugly Books. ISBN 978-3-935687-84-3.
- Martin, Patrick (2013). British Phantoms: The Phantom FG Mk.1, FGR Mk.2 and F-4J(UK) in Royal Air Force Service 1979–1992. Erlangen: Double Ugly Books. ISBN 978-3-935687-85-0.
- McDonnell Douglas Aviation (1 July 1974). McDonnell model numbers (PDF). AviationArchives.net (Report). McDonnell Douglas Aviation. Archived from the original (PDF) on 21 September 2022.
- McLelland, Tim (2016). Britain's Cold War Bombers. London, UK: Fonthill. ISBN 978-1-78155-534-7.
- McLelland, Tim (2017). Britain's Cold War Fighters. London, UK: Fonthill. ISBN 978-1-78155-630-6.
- Nicholas, Jack (July 2005). "Big Bangs For A Buck: Britain's Tactical Nuclear Forces 1960–1998". Air International. Vol. 69, no. 1. pp. 45–49. ISSN 0306-5634.
- Norris, Robert (1994). British, French and Chinese Nuclear Weapons, Nuclear Weapons Databook, Vol. V. Boulder: Westview Press. ISBN 978-0-81331-612-3.
- Peacock, Lindsay (1990). "For F4 read F3". RAF Yearbook. Fairford, England: IAT Publishing: 15–18.
- Pettit, Martin, ed. (1983). British Military Aircraft Serials and Markings. British Aviation Research Group / Nostalgair / The Aviation Hobby Shop. ISBN 978-0-90633-904-6.
- Pike, Richard (2015). Phantom Boys: True Tales from the UK Operators of the McDonnell Douglas F-4. London, UK: Grub Street. ISBN 978-1-90980-822-5.
- Proctor, Ian (2014). The Royal Air Force in the Cold War, 1950–1970. Barnsley, UK: Pen & Sword. ISBN 978-1-78383-189-0.
- Rawlings, John (1985). "The Tigers are back". RAF Yearbook. ABC: 32–39.
- Richardson, Doug (1984). Modern Fighting Aircraft F4. London, UK: Salamander Books. ISBN 978-0-86101-133-9.
- Roberts, John (2009). Safeguarding the Nation: The Story of the Royal Navy. Barnsley, UK: Seaforth Publishing. ISBN 978-1-84832-043-7.
- Smith Watson, Ian (2022). The RAF in Cold War Germany. Stroud, UK: Fonthill Media. ISBN 978-1-78155-842-3.
- Spick, Mike (1987). An Illustrated Guide to Modern Fighter Combat. London, UK: Salamander Books. ISBN 978-0-86101-319-7.
- Sturtivant, Ray (2004). Fleet Air Arm Fixed-Wing Aircraft Since 1946. Tonbridge, UK: Air-Britain. ISBN 978-0-85130-283-6.
- Sumner, E.K. (January 1971). "Ark Royal: Pride of Great Britain" (PDF). Naval Aviation News. Chief of Naval Operations. pp. 36–39. Archived (PDF) from the original on 1 November 2021.
- Thetford, Owen (1991). British Naval Aircraft Since 1912. London, UK: Putnam. ISBN 978-0-85177-849-5.
- Thornborough, Anthony; Davies, Peter (1994). The Phantom Story. London, UK: Weidenfeld Military. ISBN 978-1-85409-121-5.
- Turner, Paul St. John (1970). "McDonnell Douglas F-4 Phantom" (PDF). Profile (208). Windsor, UK: Profile Publications: 61–80. Archived from the original (PDF) on 24 January 2025.
- "RAF and FAA Phantom losses". Ejection History. 15 November 2012. Archived from the original on 24 August 2015.
- Walker, John (March 2019). A History of the United Kingdom's WE 177 Nuclear Weapons Programme: From Conception to Entry into Service 1959–1980 (PDF) (Report). British American Security Information Council. Archived from the original (PDF) on 10 January 2025.
- White, Rowland (2010). Phoenix Squadron. London, England: Corgi Books. ISBN 978-0-552-15290-7.
- Williams, Graham (2016). Rhapsody in Blue: An RAF Fighter Pilot's Life During the Cold War. London, UK: Fonthill Media. ISBN 978-1-78155-535-4.
- Winchester, Jim (2010). Jet Fighters: Inside & Out. London, UK: Amber Books. ISBN 978-1-90744-619-1.
- Wright, Kevin (October 2018). "Phantoms in RAF service" (PDF). Aviation News. Stamford, UK: Key Publishing. pp. 42–51. Archived from the original (PDF) on 18 July 2020.
