= 1982 Royal Air Force Jaguar shootdown incident =

Royal Air Force friendly fire incident

Coordinates: 51°12′N 6°7′E

1982 Royal Air Force Jaguar shootdown
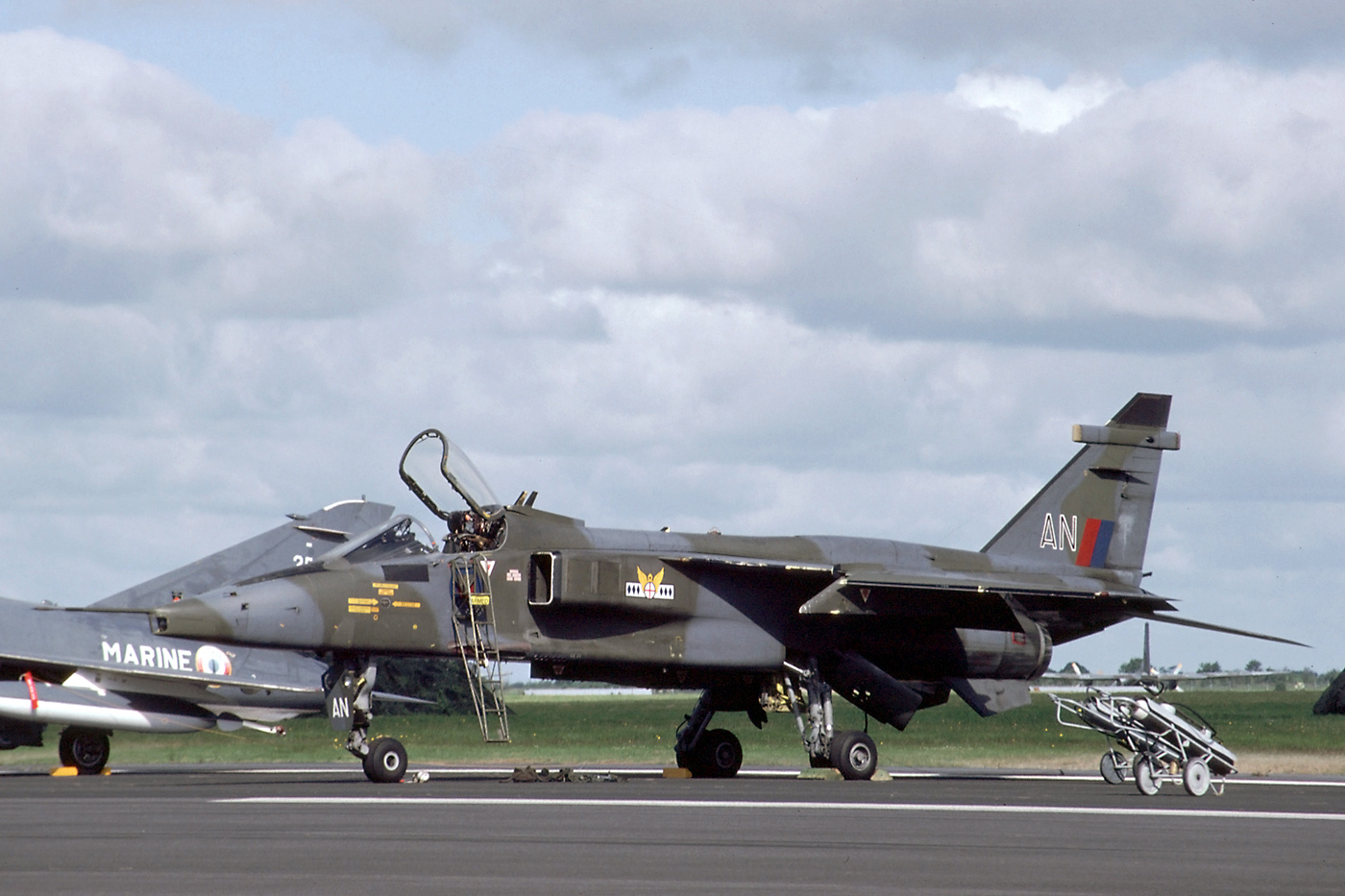
- Jaguar GR1, identical to the aircraft lost

Shootdown
- Date: 25 May 1982
- Summary: Shot down in friendly fire incident
- Site: 35 miles NE of RAF Brüggen

Aircraft
- Aircraft type: SEPECAT Jaguar GR1
- Operator: Royal Air Force
- Registration: XX963
- Flight origin: RAF Brüggen
- Crew: 1
- Survivors: 1

On 25 May 1982, a Royal Air Force SEPECAT Jaguar of 14 Squadron, while returning to its base at RAF Brüggen in Germany following a training mission, was accidentally hit by an air-to-air missile fired by another Royal Air Force aircraft, a McDonnell Douglas Phantom. As a result, the Jaguar crashed in farmland approximately 35 miles from its base, although the pilot was able to eject safely.

== Background ==
In 1982, the Royal Air Force (RAF) maintained a substantial presence in West Germany under the command of a formation named RAF Germany. RAF Germany's primary focus was the provision of combat aircraft to the Second Allied Tactical Air Force, a NATO formation tasked with the aerial defence of Western Europe. This overall command formation contained a total of 14 individual squadrons across four bases. Included among this list was five squadrons operating the SEPECAT Jaguar, a single seat aircraft utilised in both the strike and tactical reconnaissance roles, and two squadrons using the McDonnell Douglas Phantom, which, at the time, was the RAF's primary air defence interceptor.

== Incident ==
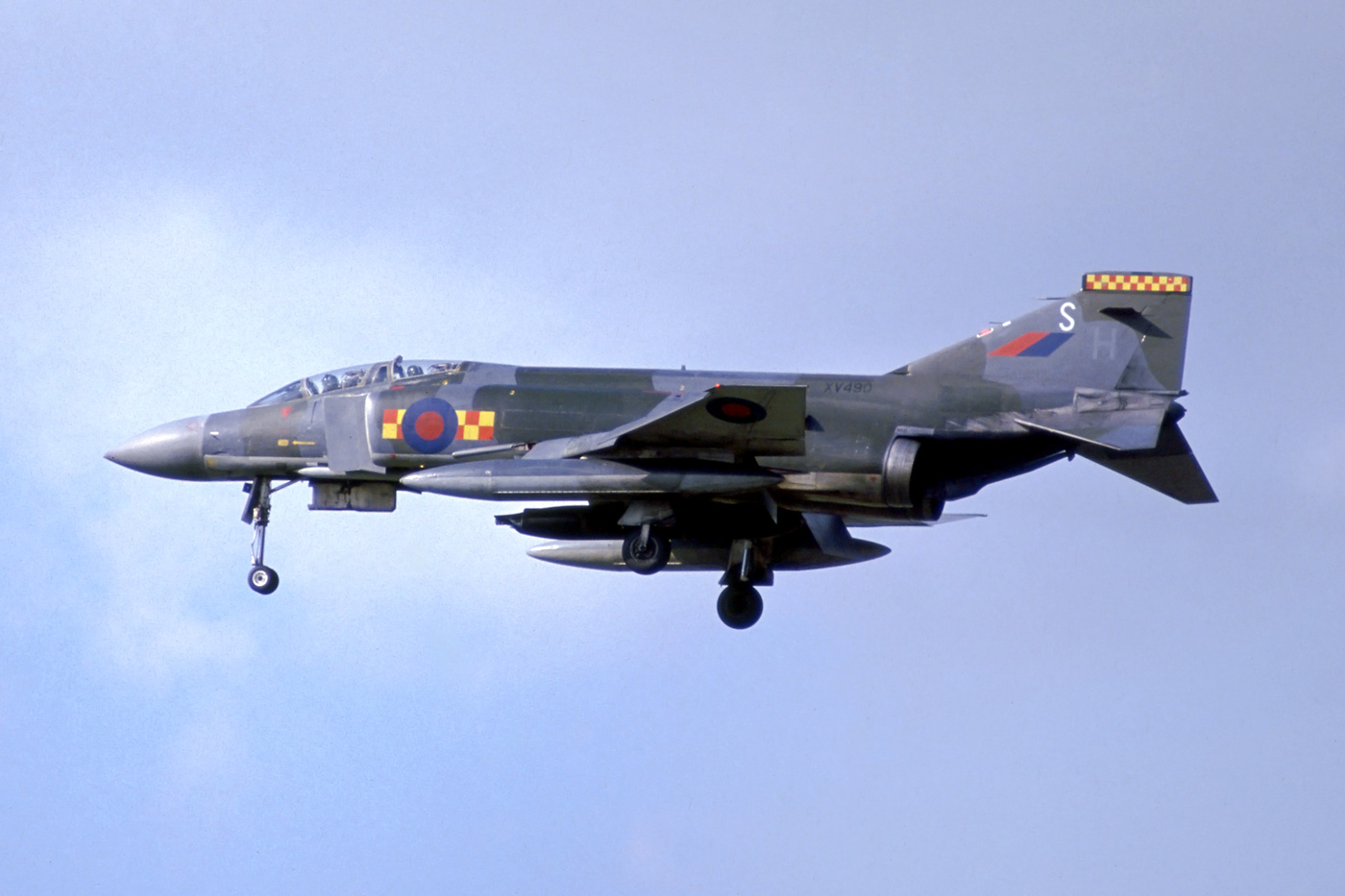
A Phantom FGR2 identical to the one involved in the incident

The missile used was an AIM-9G Sidewinder, a variant of the original Sidewinder missile that was developed for use by the US Navy.

On 25 May 1982, a pair of Jaguar GR1s from 14 Squadron, having undertaken a training mission, were en route back to their base at RAF Brüggen. At the same time, RAF Wildenrath was in the middle of a station air defence exercise, which would see the station's force of Phantoms, armed with inert training missiles, scrambled by fighter controllers to "intercept" other RAF Germany aircraft operating in the area. At approximately 1240 hours, Phantom FGR2 XV422, operated by 92 Squadron, and crewed by Flt Lt Roy Lawrence (pilot) and Flt Lt Alistair Inverarity (navigator), was scrambled to intercept the incoming pair of Jaguars. Having located the Jaguar pair, the Phantom proceeded to make the intercept; the Jaguars however did not undertake any defensive maneuvering, owing to their fuel situation. So, the Phantom crew proceeded with their standard procedure on such a training flight, setting up for a simulated attack using their training round. But, upon the pilot pressing the missile release, an AIM-9G Sidewinder missile was launched, hitting Jaguar XX963, flown by Flt Lt Steve Griggs. The Jaguar's tail section was destroyed, with the remaining section of the aircraft entering into a flat spin. The Jaguar crashed in open farmland. Griggs was able to eject successfully, and landed in a field approximately 35 miles from Brüggen, where he was assisted by the farm owner and his daughter.

== Investigation ==
The incident led to the setting up of a board of Inquiry to investigate. This found that there had been a chain of events at Wildenrath leading to the Phantom crew firing a live missile at the Jaguar. The crew had missed the beginning of the air defence exercise, which caused their mission briefing to be hurried, while the aircraft that they had been allocated, although ostensibly assigned to the exercise, was one that had been fitted with live missiles due to it also being one of the assigned Quick Reaction Alert aircraft that day. Additionally, the master arm switch in the Phantom's cockpit, a switch designed to make live weapons safe, should have been secured in the safe position, to prevent any accidental launch of the aircraft's weapons. This would also have indicated that the aircraft was armed. A redundancy should have been in place by the pulling of a circuit breaker located in the Phantom's rear cockpit, which would have made the weapons safe, which Flt Lt Inverarity, the Phantom's navigator, insisted he had pulled. But, during investigation of the aircraft following the incident, it was found that it required only a slight inward pressure on the circuit breaker switch to establish a contact, making the weapons live. The possibility was raised that, while the aircraft was operating under high-g, the navigator accidentally hit the circuit breaker switch with his leg. Finally, neither the operations officer at Wildenrath, nor the fighter controller responsible for the Phantom during its mission, had been informed that the Phantom was armed; had the fighter controller known, one of the checks that would have been passed to the crew was "check switches safe".

== Aftermath ==
Despite the evidence of a breakdown in the chain between the Phantom being set up and the crew firing the missile, the Board of Inquiry laid the blame for the incident squarely on the shoulders of the Phantom crew, given that they had seemingly forgotten that their aircraft was armed with live weapons. As a result, the crew were sent for court martial. Although they were found guilty of negligence, the two officers were given a severe reprimand, the lightest possible sentence that could be given.

Five months after he ejected from the damaged Jaguar in the shootdown incident, Flt Lt Steve Griggs was forced to eject a second time when, on 10 September, while leading a training sortie from RAF Lossiemouth, he suffered a major fuselage fire, with his Jaguar crashing in a peat bog.
