= Shadow squadron =

Royal Air Force squadron numbering policy

Shadow squadrons are additional squadron numbers allocated to Royal Air Force training, Operational conversion, and Operational and Weapons evaluation units. Normally in peacetime these units are not tasked with combat roles, however, since 1955, UK planning for a major confrontation during the Cold War would have seen the tasking of the aircraft and pilots of these units in combat roles with the activation of the shadow designations.

Shadow squadron activation would have seen for example the RAF's BAE Systems Hawk trainers flown by flight instructors and pilots from the Red Arrows in the point air defence role with guns and AIM-9 Sidewinder missiles.

With defence cuts and the disbanding of historic squadrons the "double number plating" of squadrons was a means of preserving the histories and lineages of such squadrons against the day that they could be revived.

== Examples ==
Examples of OCU shadow squadron associations.
Unit	Squadron Shadow (Note: OCUs disbanded and reformed at different locations on different airframes. Squadron Shadow numbers also changed oftentimes, those numbers given are representative and this list is not exhaustive.)	Notes	Ref
No. 226 Operational Conversion Unit	No. 145 Squadron	In the early 1960s, it was based at RAF Coltishall to train pilots on the Lightning	
No. 228 Operational Conversion Unit	No. 64 Squadron	Based at RAF Leeming until 1961, reformed at Leuchars, then reformed again at RAF Coningsby to train crews on the Phantom aircraft	
No. 236 Operational Conversion Unit	No. 38 (Reserve) Squadron	Based at RAF St Mawgan for converting aircrew to Nimrod aircraft	

== See also ==
- Operation Banquet for the Second World War equivalent plan
