= No. 228 Operational Conversion Unit RAF =

No. 228 Operational Conversion Unit RAF

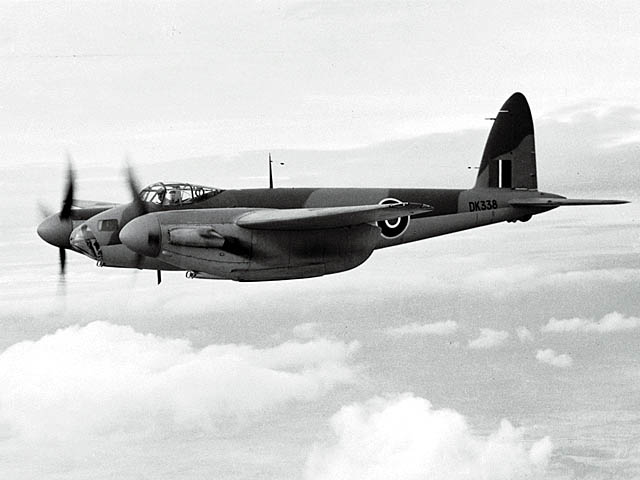
- de Havilland Mosquito
- Country: United Kingdom
- Branch: Royal Air Force
- Role: Fighter training
- Part of: 12 Group, 81 Group, 11 Group, 11 Sector, 38 Group, 11 Group

No. 228 Operational Conversion Unit was a Royal Air Force Operational conversion unit. It was formed in No. 12 Group at RAF Leeming from Nos. 13 and 54 OTUs in 1947. The tasking of the OCU was the training of night fighter crews and its aircraft were the de Havilland Mosquito, Gloster Meteor, Bristol Brigand, and Gloster Javelin over the years. The OCU lasted until 1961 at Leeming when it was disbanded.

The unit's next incarnation saw it again training night fighter crews, this time at RAF Leuchars. The aircraft was again the Javelin and the training particularly emphasised preparing crews for overseas service, and whilst at Leuchars it took on the shadow squadron number of No. 11 Squadron. The unit was taken with this role for 18 months in 1965 and 1966 before disbanding again.

Its final incarnation was as a training unit for the McDonnell Douglas F-4 Phantom II at RAF Coningsby. The unit was activated there in 1968 and moved to Leuchars during May 1987 - this time with the shadow number of No. 64 Squadron. The OCU fell victim to post-Cold War cutbacks and was permanently disbanded in January 1991.

== See also ==
- List of conversion units of the Royal Air Force
