= San Diego crash =

San Diego crash may refer to:

- 1959 San Diego F3H crash, crashed on December 4, 1959
- Pacific Southwest Airlines Flight 182, crashed on September 25, 1978
- 2008 San Diego F/A-18 crash, crashed on December 8, 2008
- 2025 San Diego Cessna Citation II crash, crashed on May 22, 2025
