= Jet blast deflector =

Safety device that redirects exhaust from a jet engine

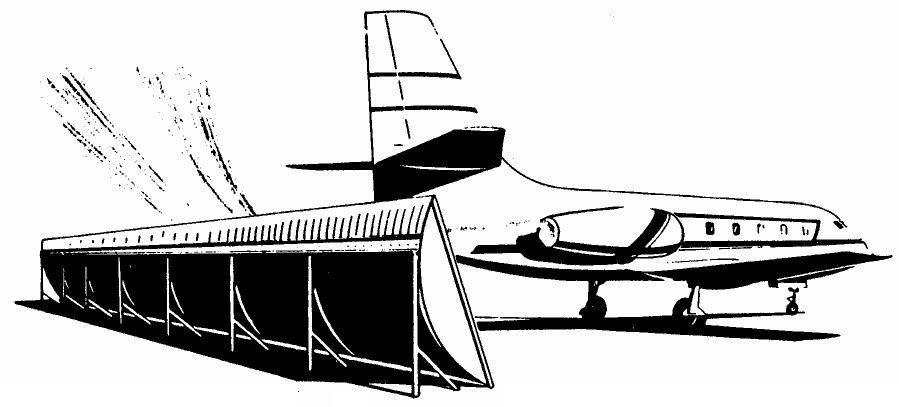
A typical blast fence at an airport

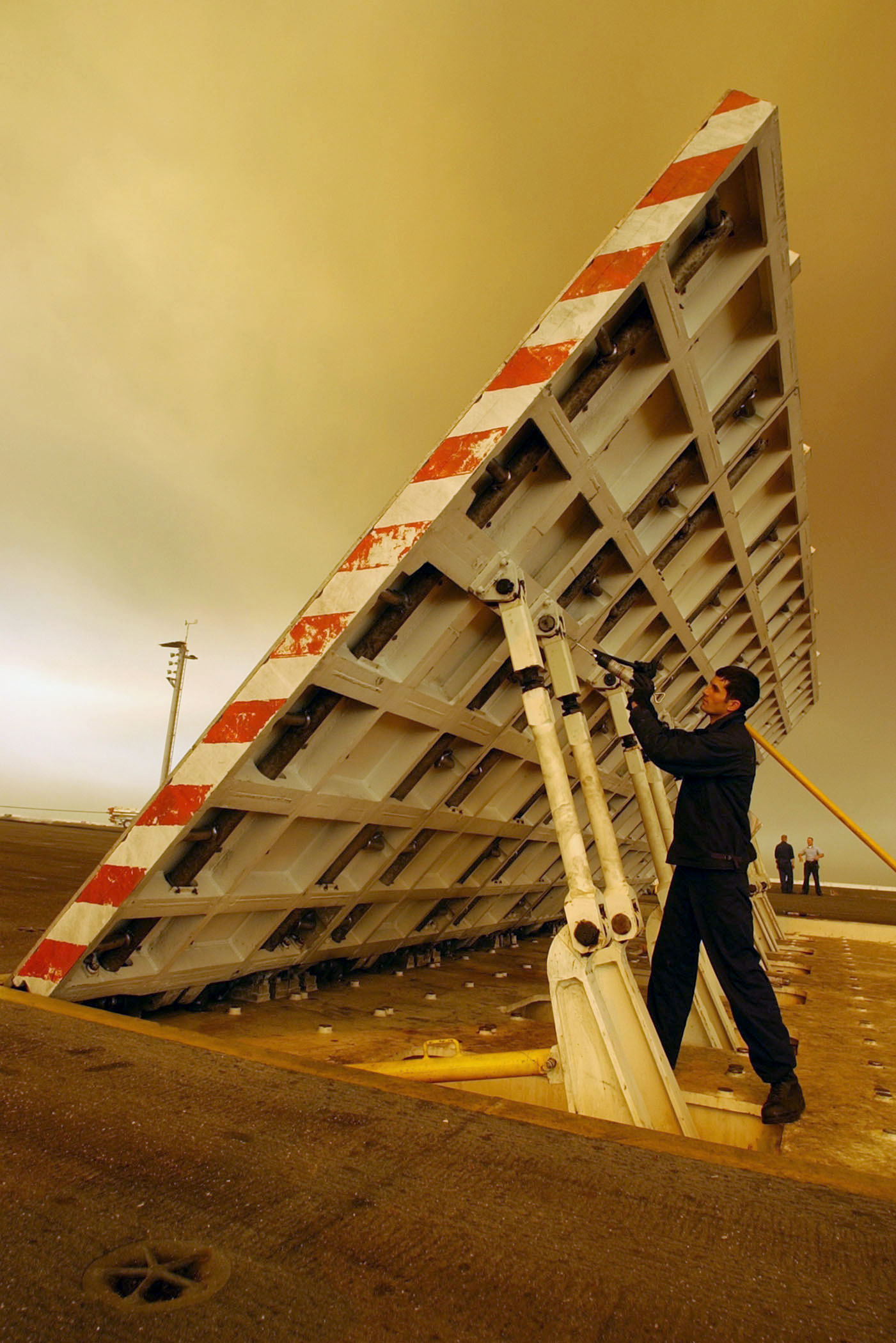
An airman services a jet blast deflector (JBD) before flight operations aboard an aircraft carrier

A jet blast deflector (JBD) or blast fence is a safety device that redirects the high energy exhaust from a jet engine to prevent damage and injury. The structure must be strong enough to withstand heat and high speed air streams as well as dust and debris carried by the turbulent air. Without a deflector, jet blast can be dangerous to people, equipment, vehicles and other aircraft.

Jet blast deflectors range in complexity from stationary concrete, metal or fiberglass fences to heavy panels that are raised and lowered by hydraulic arms and actively cooled. Blast deflectors can be used as protection from helicopter and fixed-wing aircraft propwash. At airports and jet engine service centers, jet blast deflectors can be combined with sound-deadening walls to form a ground run-up enclosure within which a jet aircraft engine can safely and more quietly be tested at full thrust.

== Purpose ==
High energy jet engine exhaust can cause injury and damage. Jet blast has been known to uproot trees, shatter windows, overturn automobiles and trucks, flatten poorly made structures and injure people. Other aircraft in the jet blast, especially lightweight ones, have been blown around and damaged by jet exhaust. Hurricane-force air streams moving at speeds up to 100 knots (190 km/h; 120 mph) have been measured behind the largest jet-powered aircraft at distances of over 200 feet (60 m). A Boeing 777's two General Electric GE90 engines combine to create a thrust of approximately 200,000 pounds-force (900,000 N), a level of force which is high enough to kill people. To prevent these problems, jet blast deflectors redirect the air stream in a non-dangerous direction, frequently upward.

=== Airports ===
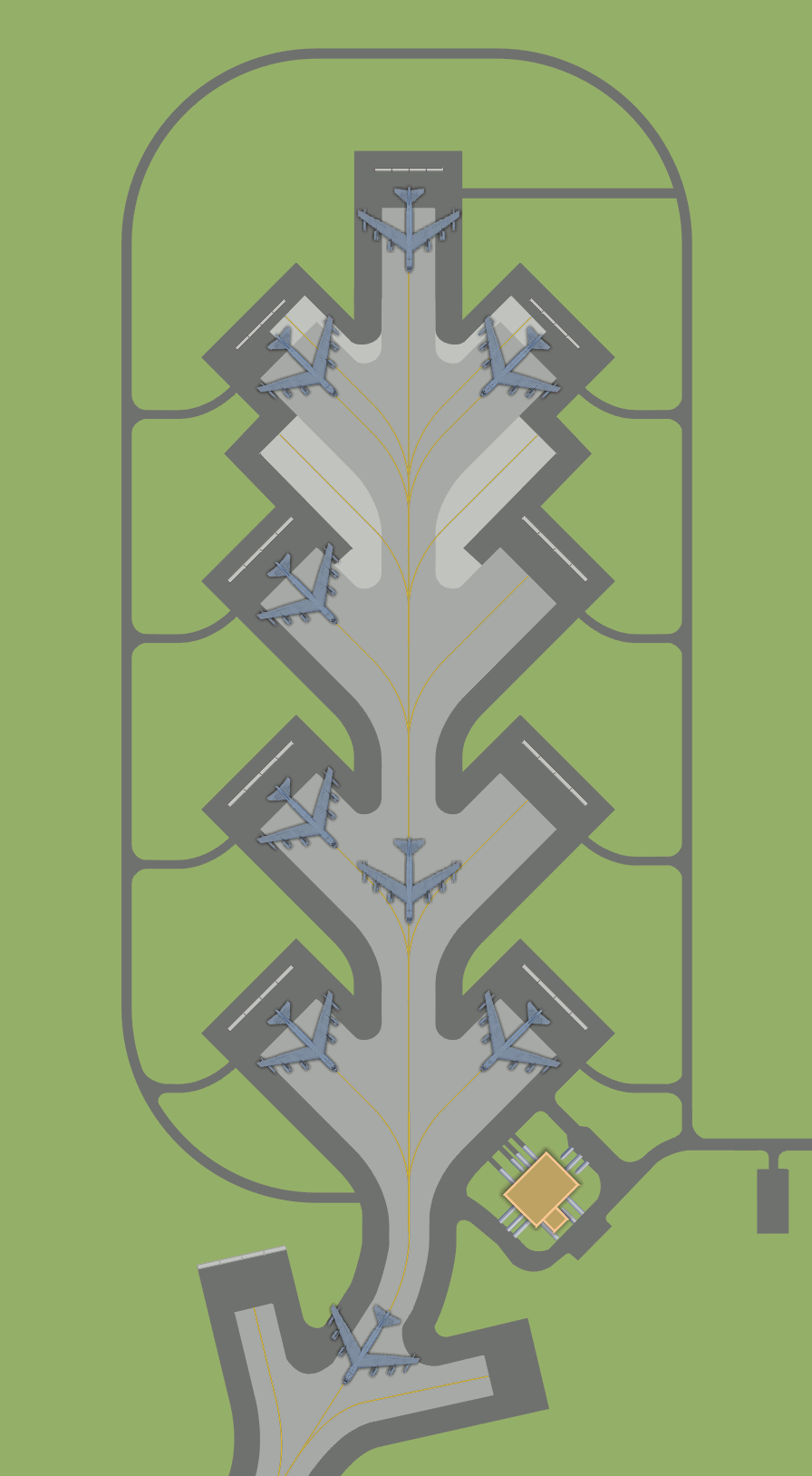
An illustration of a Christmas tree at Glasgow Air Force Base, showing the positioning of the jet blast deflectors

Jet blast deflectors began to appear at airports in the 1950s. Airports in the 1960s used jet blast deflectors with a height of 6 to 8 feet (1.8 to 2.4 m), but airports in the 1990s needed deflectors that were twice as high, and even up to 35 feet (11 m) high for jet airliners such as the McDonnell Douglas DC-10 and MD-11, which have engines mounted in the tail above the fuselage. Airports often place their deflectors at the beginnings of runways, especially when roadways or structures are adjacent. Airports that are in dense urban areas often have deflectors between taxiways and airport borders. Jet blast deflectors usually direct exhaust gases upward. However, a low-pressure zone can form behind the blast fence, causing ambient air and debris to be drawn upward with the jet exhaust, and hot, toxic gases to circulate behind the blast fence. Jet blast deflectors have been designed to counteract this problem by using multiple panels and various angles, and by using slotted panel surfaces.

==== Ground run-up enclosure ====
After a jet engine has been overhauled or has undergone the replacement of parts, it is normal to run the engine up to full thrust to test it. Rural airports rarely provide more than a distant portion of the airfield within which to test engines at full thrust, but urban airports surrounded by residential areas often specify that engine tests be conducted within a ground run-up enclosure ("hush house"), so that the engine noise can be reduced for residents.

=== Aircraft carriers ===
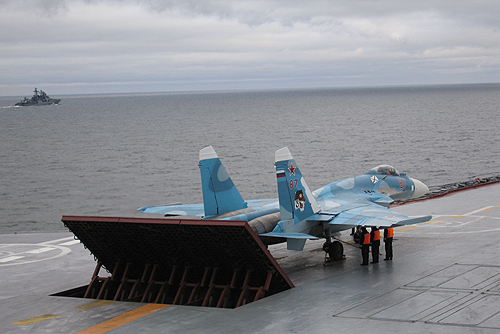
A Sukhoi Su-33 preparing for take-off on the Russian aircraft carrier Admiral Kuznetsov, with the jet blast deflector deployed

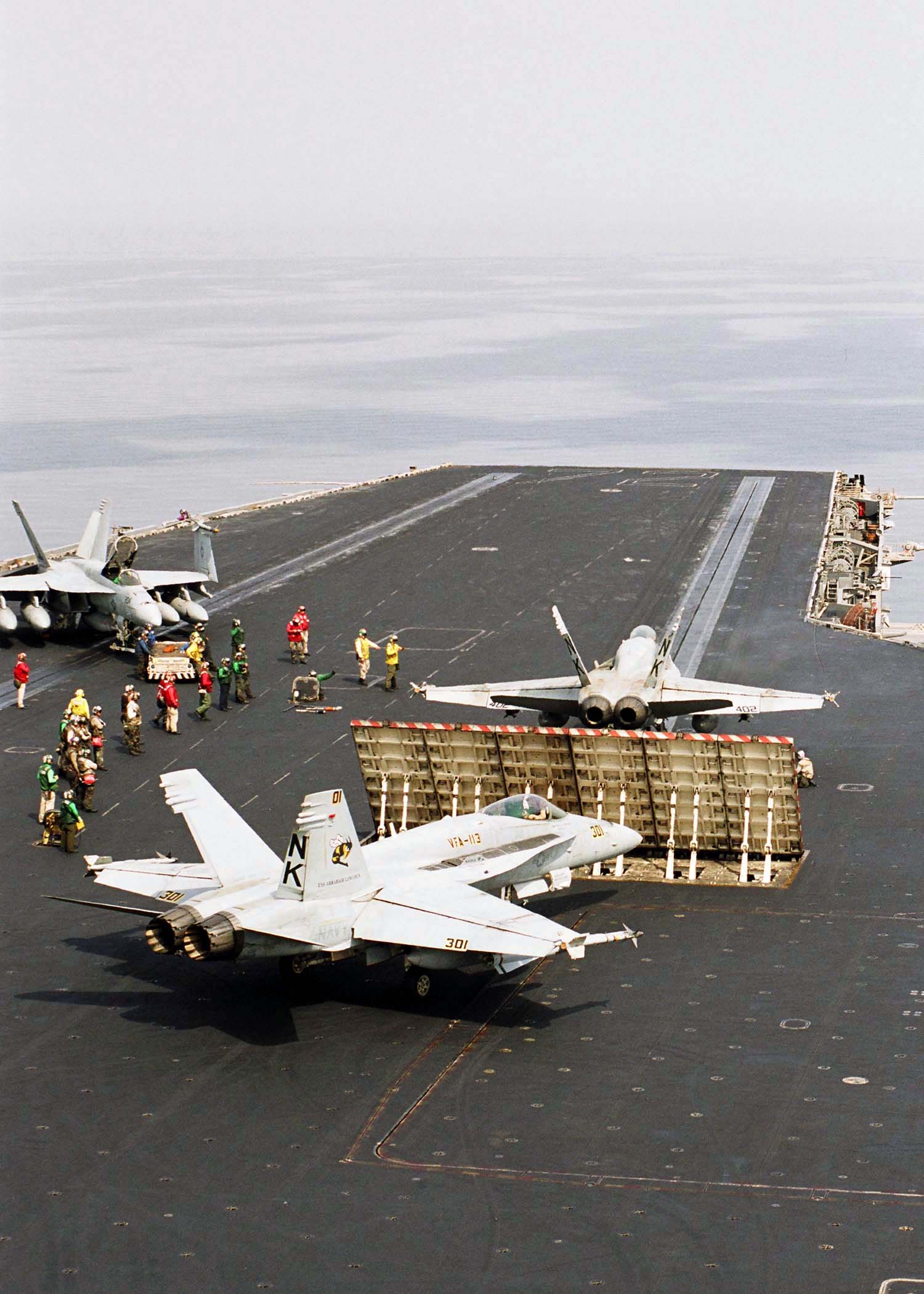
In 2003 aboard the USS Abraham Lincoln (CVN-72), a jet blast deflector is raised hydraulically to protect an F/A-18 Hornet from the exhaust of another

Aircraft carriers use jet blast deflectors at the rear of aircraft catapults, positioned to protect other aircraft from exhaust blast damage. Jet blast deflectors are made of heavy duty material that is raised and lowered by hydraulic cylinders or linear actuators. The jet blast deflector lies flush with and serves as a portion of the flight deck until the aircraft to be launched rolls over it on the way to the catapult. When the aircraft is clear of the deflector, the heavy panel is raised into position to redirect the hot jet blast. As soon as the deflector is raised, another aircraft can be brought into position behind it, and flight deck personnel can perform final readiness duties without the danger of hot, violent exhaust gases. Such systems were installed on aircraft carriers in the late 1940s and early 1950s, as jet-powered aircraft began to appear in navies.

Jet blast deflectors aboard aircraft carriers are placed in very close proximity to the 2,300 °F (1,300 °C) temperatures of modern jet fighter exhaust. The non-skid decking surface of the deflector suffers heat damage and requires frequent maintenance or replacement. Additionally, the hot deflector surface cannot be used as normal decking until it has cooled enough to allow aircraft tires to roll over it. To mitigate the heat problem, active cooling systems were installed in the 1970s, tapping the fire mains (fire suppression water systems) to use seawater circulating through water lines within the deflector panel. However, the water cooling system adds more complexity and failure points, and requires additional maintenance. The most recent method tried by the United States Navy for solving the heat problem was introduced in 2008 with USS George H.W. Bush which uses heavy-duty metal panels covered in heat-dissipating ceramic tiles similar to those used on the Space Shuttle. The tiled panels can be changed quickly and easily – the ship carries a large replacement supply. Without active water lines, the passively-tiled deflector is expected to require much less maintenance.

== Blast deflector ==
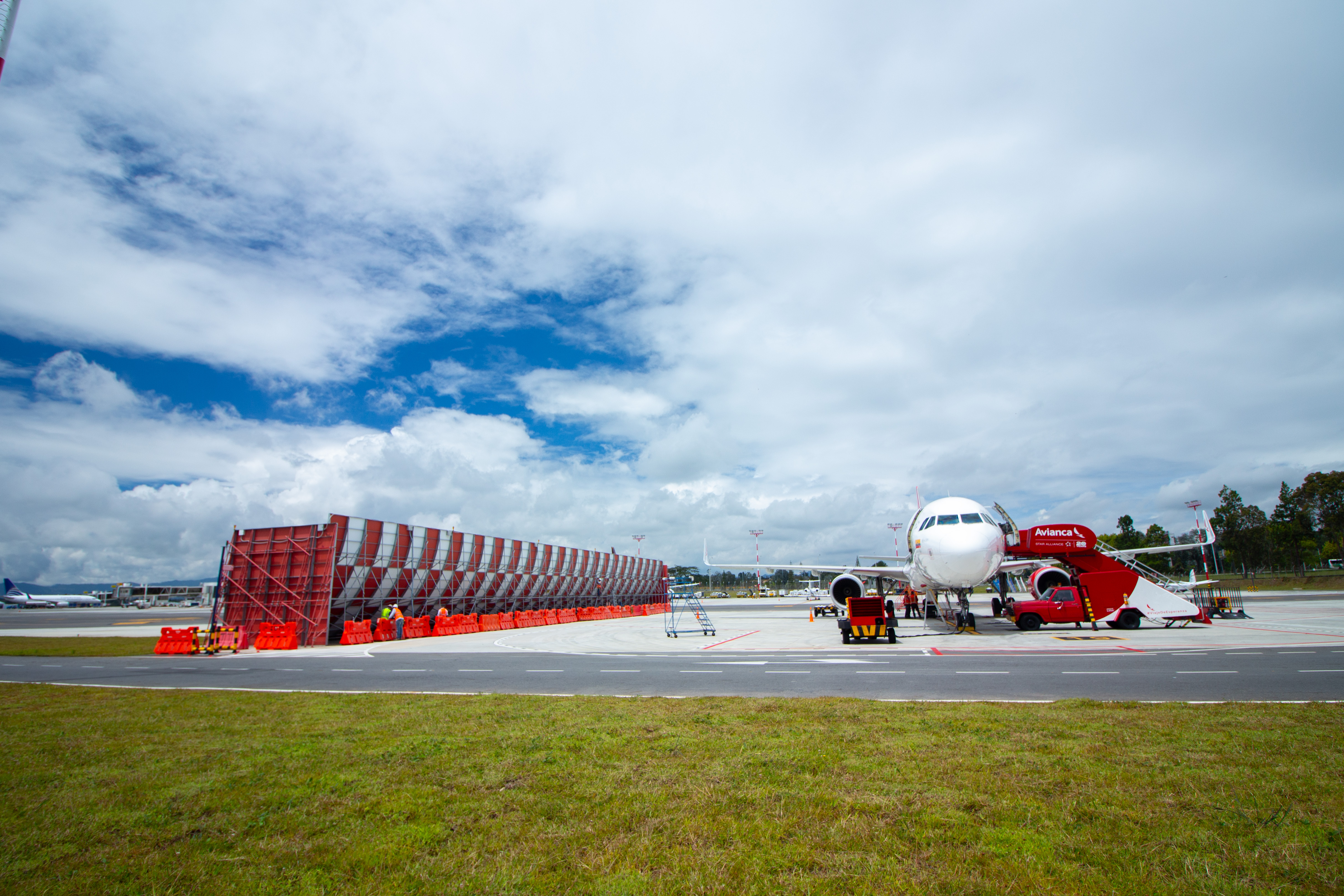
Airbus A320 protected behind a new generation Jet Blast deflector at close distance. This is providing service at Rionegro International Airport José María Córdova

A jet blast deflector is often called simply a "blast deflector", however, this term has other uses. In gunnery, the term "blast deflector" refers to a device which protects the gun crew from the muzzle blast of a gun. In small arms, a "blast deflector" is another name for a muzzle brake which directs muzzle blast to the sides and upward to prevent the muzzle from climbing during automatic fire.

== See also ==
- Index of aviation articles
- Etihad Airways A340-600 F-WWCJ accident—a jet accident within a ground run-up enclosure
- Air Moorea Flight 1121—accident caused in part by the lack of a jet blast barrier
- Death at Princess Juliana International Airport in 2017.
