= 1959 San Diego F3H crash =

Aircraft accident

Coordinates: 32.8450°N 117.1884°W

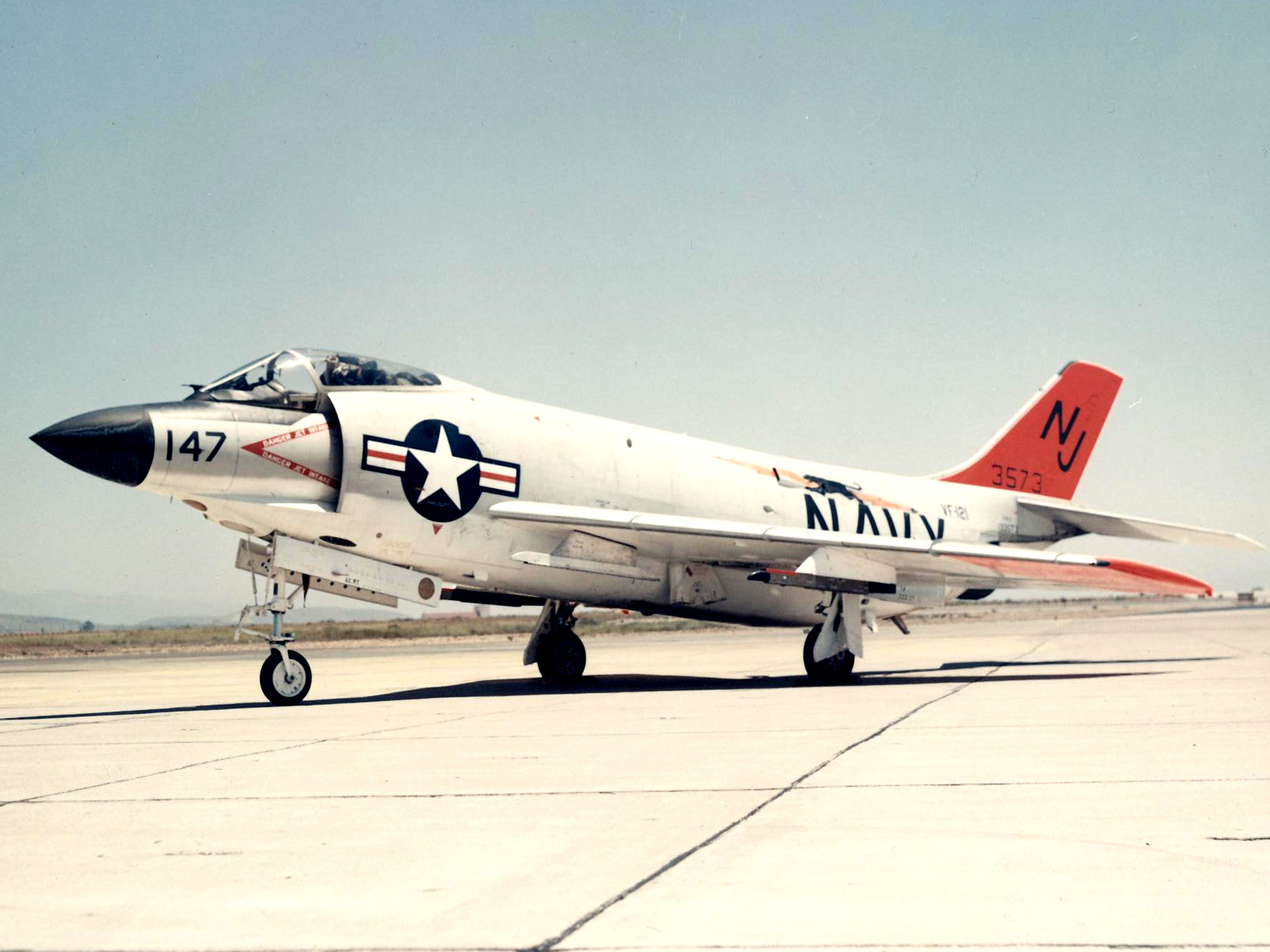
- F3H-2N Demon of Fighter Squadron VF-121 in 1956

Accident
- Date: 4 December 1959
- Summary: Mechanical failure
- Site: Clairemont, San Diego, US

Aircraft
- Aircraft type: McDonnell F3H-2N Demon
- Operator: United States Navy
- Flight origin: Miramar Naval Air Station
- Stopover: Unknown aircraft carrier
- Destination: Miramar Naval Air Station
- Crew: 1
- Fatalities: 1 (pilot)
- Survivors: 0

The 1959 San Diego F3H crash was the crash of a McDonnell F3H-2N Demon operated by the United States Navy in San Diego, California, United States, on 4 December 1959. The pilot, Ensign Albert Joseph Hickman from VF-121, chose not to eject from the stricken aircraft, piloting it away from populated areas of Clairemont, including an elementary school, saving "as many as 700 people" on the ground, according to one estimate. (Note: "December 4 - In 1959, Navy pilot Albert Joe Hickman steered his crashing jet fighter away from Hawthorne Elementary School in Clairemont, saving as many as 700 lives at the expense of his own." Matthew T. Hall) The aircraft crashed into a canyon, with the pilot being the sole fatality. Hickman has been memorialized in the naming of an elementary school and a sports complex in San Diego. Several decades later, a similar crash occurred in University City, a neighborhood north of Clairemont.

== Background ==
=== Pilot ===
Albert Joseph Hickman was born in Sioux City, Iowa, on April 4, 1938. (Note: Another source, states that Hickam was born in Homer, Nebraska.) Later he graduated from Central High School in 1956, enlisting in the Navy before graduating. Hickman was a naval aviator, being assigned to VF-121, a training squadron at Naval Air Station Miramar.

=== Crash district ===
Miramar was previously part of a rancho controlled by Mission San Diego de Alcalá, before becoming Camp Kearny, a Naval Auxiliary Air Field, and then Miramar Naval Air Station. Another part of the rancho controlled by Mission San Diego de Alcalá would become the current neighborhood of Clairemont; previously cattle grazing land, it was developed in the 1950s into one of the United States' largest postwar planned tract house suburban communities. Part of the neighborhood of Clairemont is within the airport traffic area of Miramar.

== Crash ==
On 4 December 1959, Hickman was practicing carrier landings. As he returned to Miramar in his McDonnell F3H-2N Demon, the aircraft's engine failed. The aircraft was at an altitude of 2,000 feet (610 m) when the engine compressor stalled and surged. It was reported that Hickman chose not to eject from the stricken aircraft and even opened the aircraft canopy and waved to warn children of his aircraft, all the while steering it away from Hawthorne Elementary School in Clairemont, just missing the school's fence. Ultimately, the aircraft crashed in San Clemente Canyon; it resulted in a burning of 20 acres (81,000 m^{2}) of canyon brush. Hickman was the sole fatality.

== Aftermath ==
An estimate claims that as many as 700 lives were saved when Hickman steered the aircraft during its crash. For his actions that led to his death, Hickman was posthumously awarded the Navy and Marine Corps Medal. He is buried at Memorial Park Cemetery in Sioux City. The location of the crash site is on Diane Avenue in Clairemont, with no remnants remaining at the site.

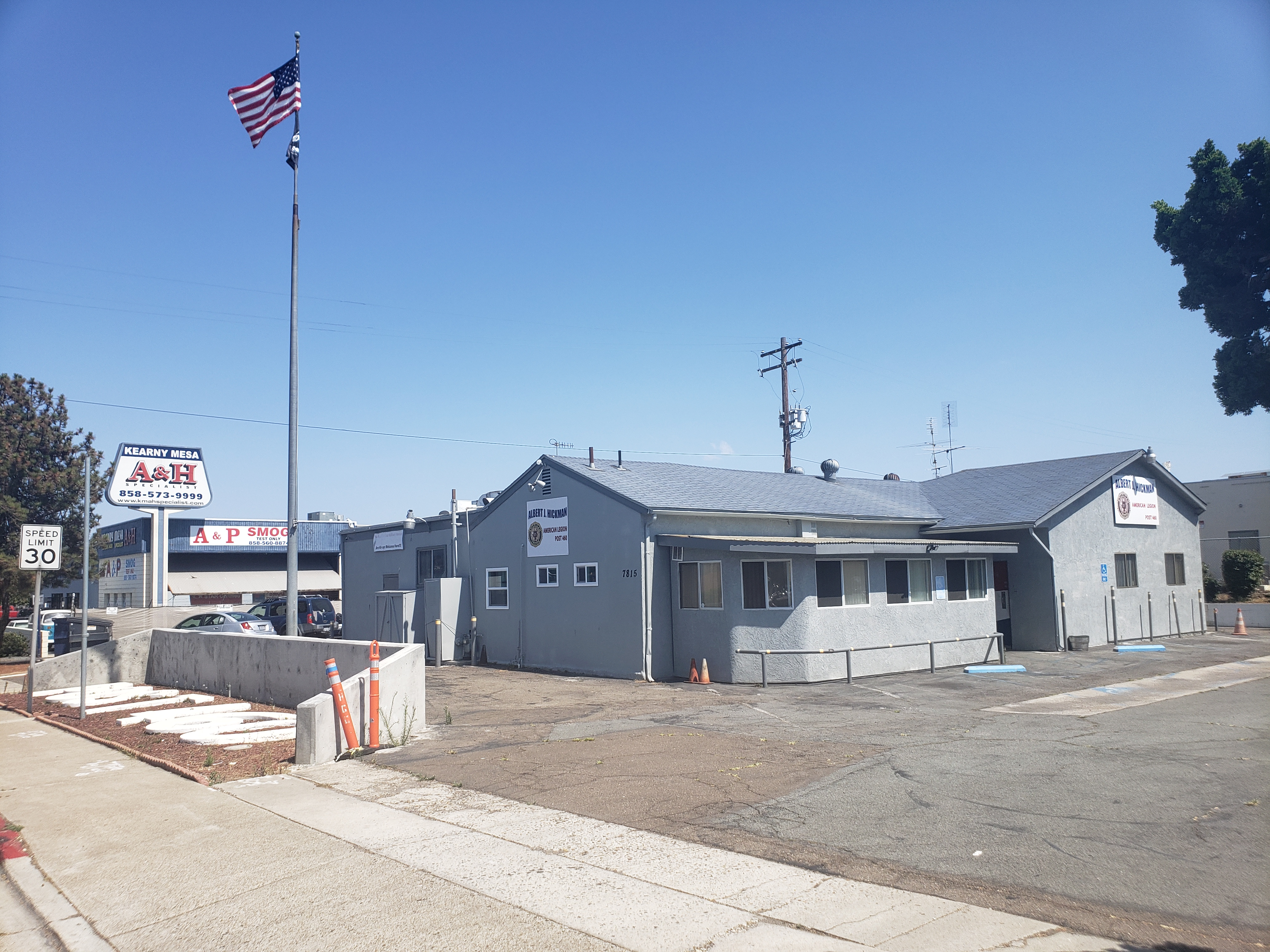
Building of the American Legion post named in honor of Hickman.

Hickman has been memorialized in several ways; in 1962, an American Legion post in Kearny Mesa was dedicated to Hickman. In 1971, an elementary school in the Mira Mesa neighborhood was named after Hickman; its construction was completed in 1976. In 1994, on land leased from the US Navy, a sports complex was also dedicated in honor of Hickman.

Several decades later, a similar event as the crash in 1959 occurred during the 2008 San Diego F/A-18 crash. On 8 December, a United States Marine Corps two-seat F/A-18D had engine problems after taking off from the USS Abraham Lincoln during training. Instead of landing at Naval Air Station North Island, Lieutenant Dan Neubauer flew the ailing aircraft to Miramar. Neubauer and the aircraft were part of Marine Fighter Attack Training Squadron 101 based at Miramar. On its way to Miramar, both of the aircraft's engines failed. Neubauer decided to eject from the aircraft, which was seconds from crashing. The pilot-less aircraft crashed into a residential area of University City that was 1/4 mile (400 m) from University City High School, and 2 miles (3 km) from Miramar; four people were killed on the ground. Neubauer ejected safely, landing east of University City High School; he was later cleared to fly again. This crash was compared to the 1959 crash.

In 2019, a commemorative plaque for Hickman was added to the Mt. Soledad National Veterans Memorial.

== See also ==
- List of accidents and incidents involving military aircraft (1955–1959)
