= Muffler =

Device for reducing the noise emitted by the exhaust

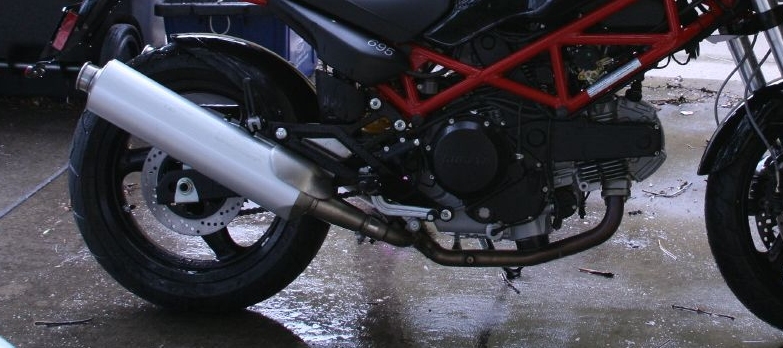
Silencer (silver) and exhaust pipe on a Ducati motorcycle

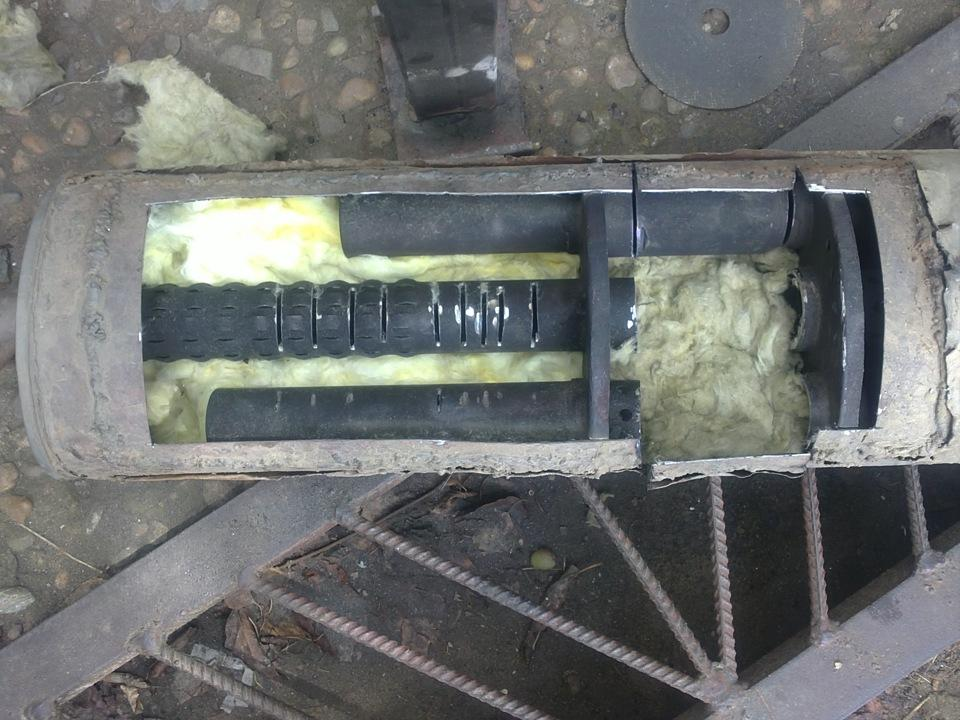
A silencer cut open to show the insulation, chambers and piping inside the shell

A muffler (North American and Australian English) or silencer (British English) is a device for reducing the noise emitted by the exhaust of an internal combustion engine—especially a noise-deadening device forming part of the exhaust system of an automobile.

== Operation ==
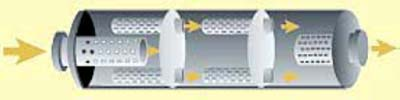
A cutaway muffler showing the interior pipes and chambers which reduces noise

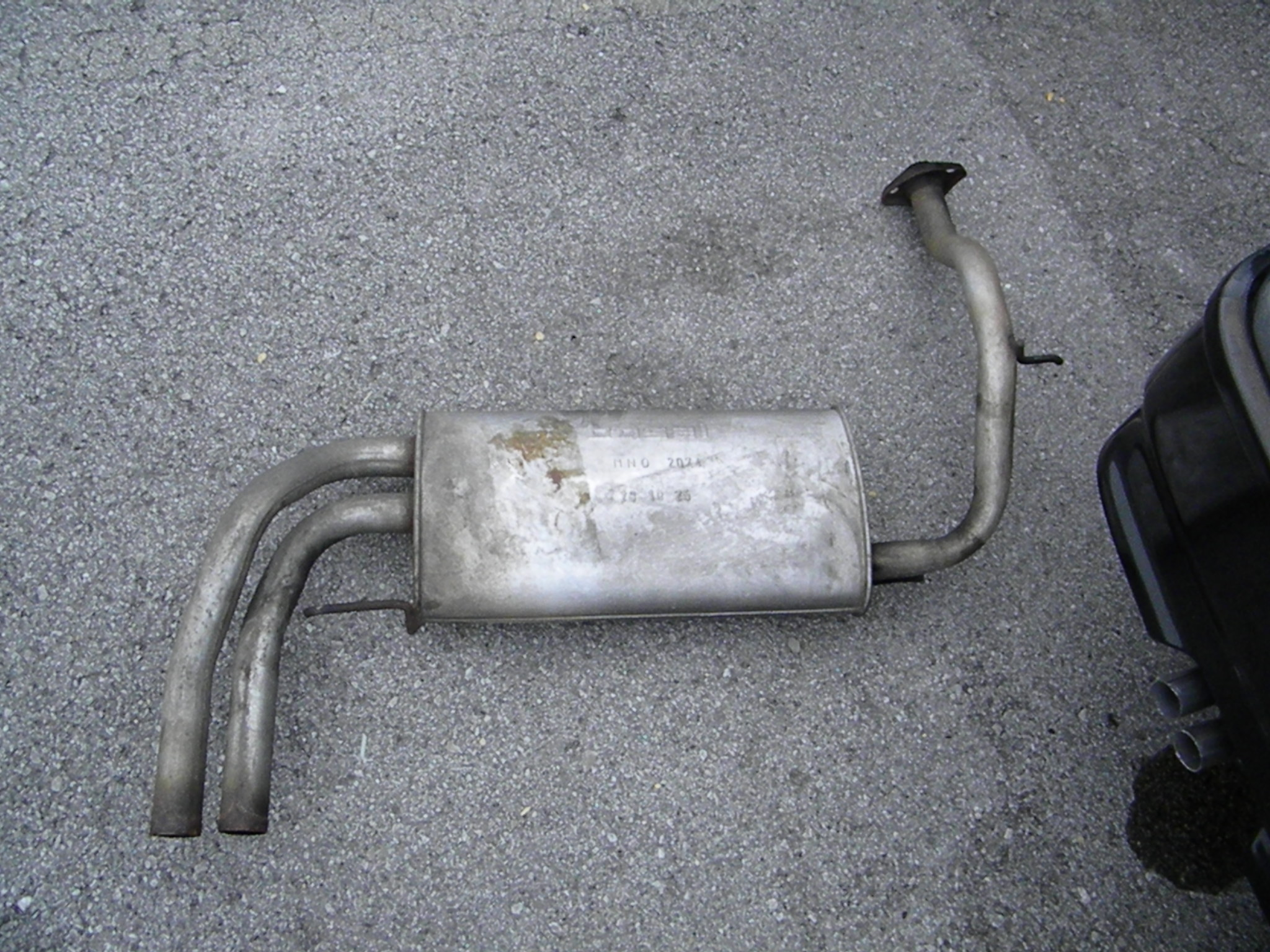
A muffler with pipes

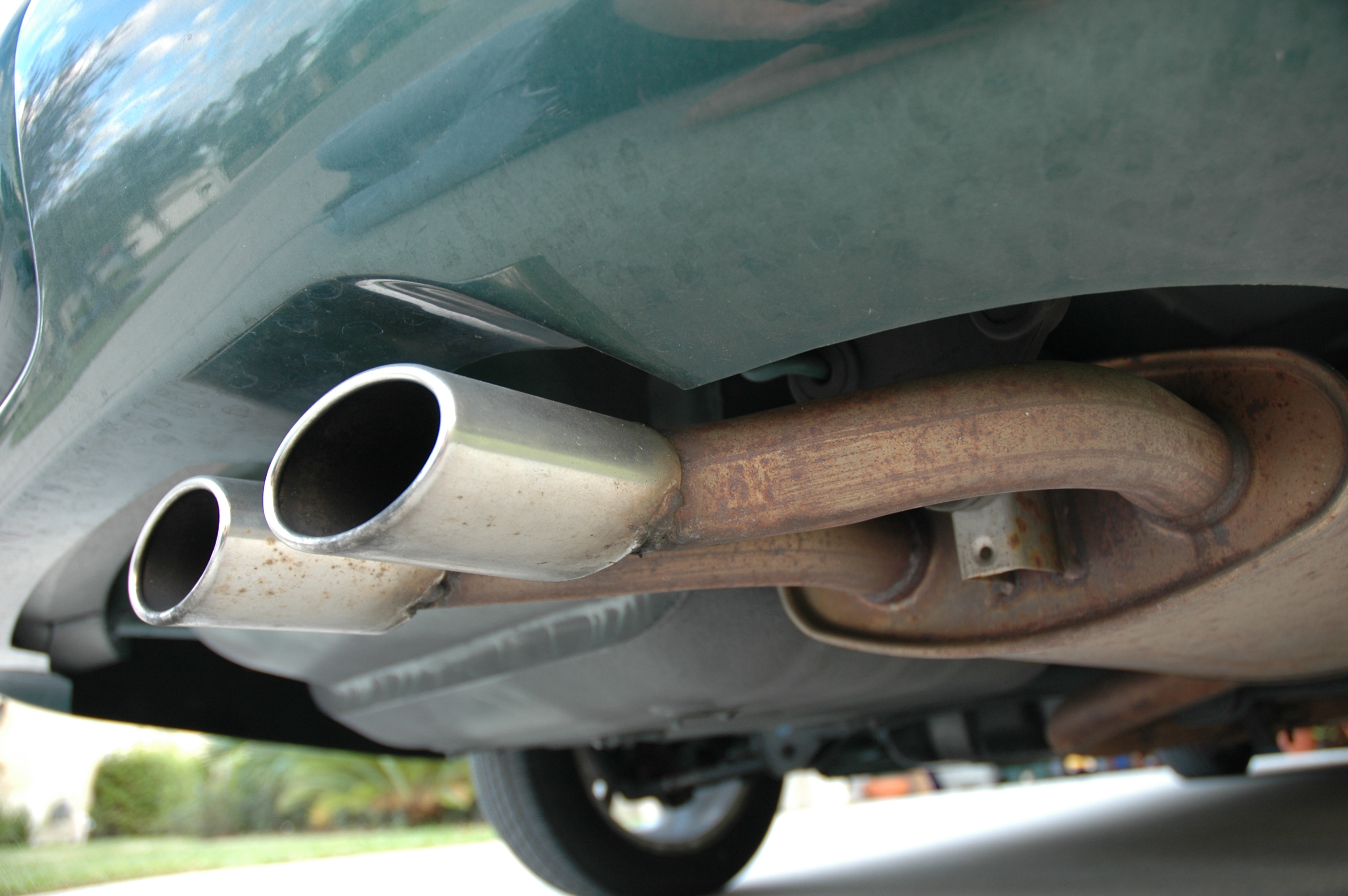
Dual tailpipes attached to the muffler on a passenger car to reduce the sound produced

Mufflers are installed within the exhaust system of most internal combustion engines. Mufflers are engineered as an acoustic device to reduce the loudness of the sound pressure created by the engine by acoustic quieting. Sound reduction techniques used in mufflers include: reactive silencing, resistive silencing, absorptive silencing, and shell damping. The noise of the hot exhaust gas exiting the engine can be abated by a series of passages and chambers lined with roving fiberglass insulation and/or resonating chambers harmonically tuned to cause destructive interference, wherein opposite sound waves cancel each other out.

The operation of an internal combustion engine produces distinct pulses of exhaust gas that exit through the exhaust pipes and the muffler. For example, a four-cylinder engine will have four high-pressure pulses for each operating cycle, a six-cylinder engine will emit six high-pressure pulses, and so on. These pulses are separated by a low-pressure pulse between them which functions as a scavenging mechanism for the next exhaust cycle from the cylinder. The exhaust system needs negative pressure waves so they help empty the cylinder of gases. The more distinct separate pulses in the exhaust system, the more positive the exhaust flow, and the more efficiently the exhaust gas is scavenged from each cylinder.

The design of the exhaust systems and mufflers must compromise effective exhaust gas extraction and exhaust gas pressure, engine fuel efficiency and power, as well as noise suppression. A side effect of noise reduction is the restriction of the exhaust gas flow, which creates back pressure, which can decrease engine efficiency. This is because the engine exhaust must share the same complex exit pathway built inside the muffler as the sound pressure that the muffler is designed to mitigate. However, having some back pressure helps. Higher backpressure can also help nitrous oxides (NOx) emission reduction in some engines.

When engine performance is the main concern, the exhaust pipes and muffler should be large enough to facilitate breathing as well as small enough to create a high exhaust flow. The objective of a muffled high-performance exhaust system depends on two independent factors: "the pressure wave tuning from length/diameter selection, and minimizing backpressure by selecting mufflers of suitable flow capacity for the application."

Some aftermarket mufflers claim to increase engine output and/or reduce fuel consumption by slightly reduced back pressure. This usually entails less noise reduction (i.e., more noise). Greater muffler flow may increase engine power, but excess muffler flow capability provides no additional benefits and can be more expensive as well as being noisier.

== Regulations ==
On May 18, 1905, the state of Oregon passed a law that required vehicles to have "a light, a muffler, and efficient brakes".

The legality of altering a motor vehicle's original equipment exhaust system varies by jurisdiction; in many developed countries such as the United States, Canada, and Australia, such modifications are highly regulated or strictly prohibited.

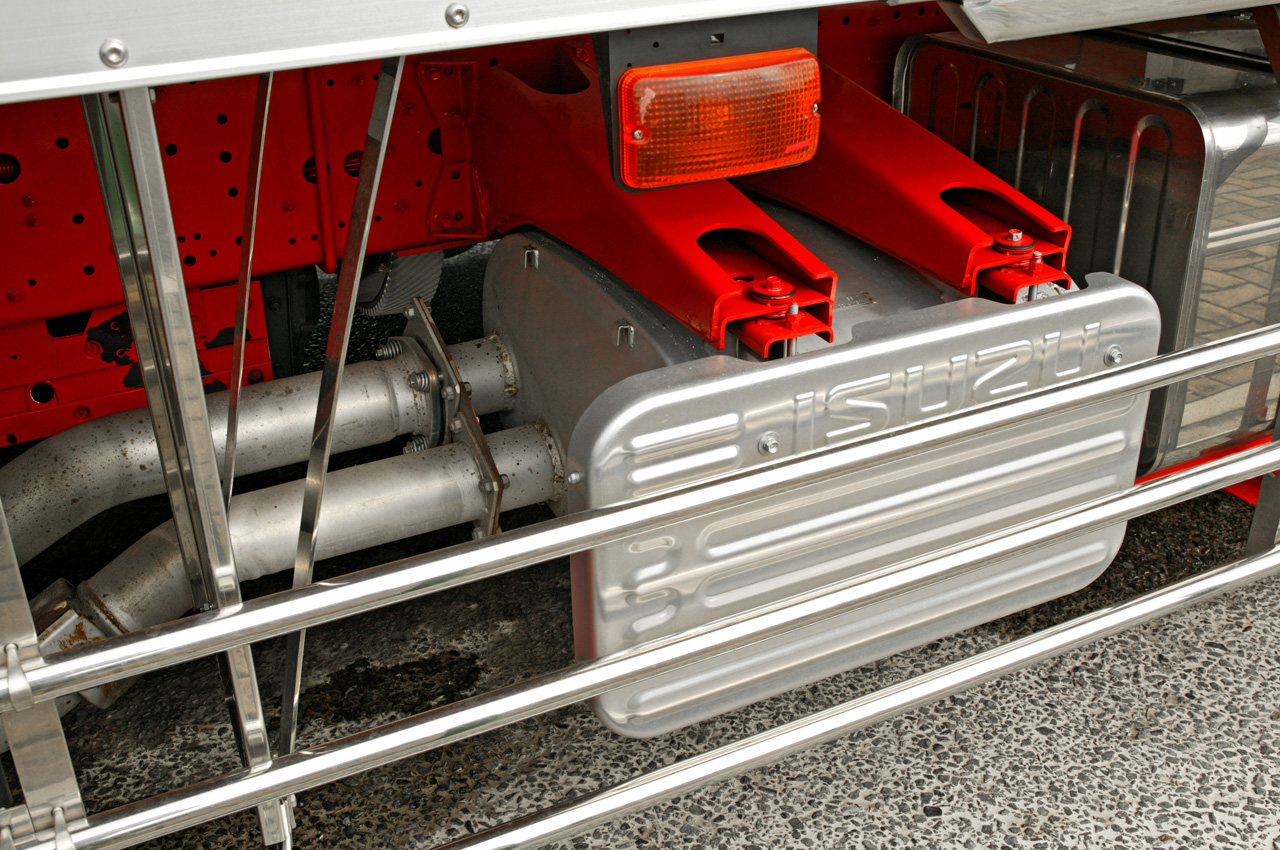
A muffler on a large diesel-powered truck

== See also ==
- Noise control
- Hush kit
- Hush house
- Soundproofing
- Anechoic chamber
- Vibration isolation
- Shock absorber
- Cushioning
- Damped wave
- Damping ratio
- Detuner
- Sound attenuator
- Suppressor
- List of auto parts
