= Marine Corps Air Station Miramar =

USMC installation that is home to the 3rd Marine Aircraft Wing

- San Diego, California in the United States
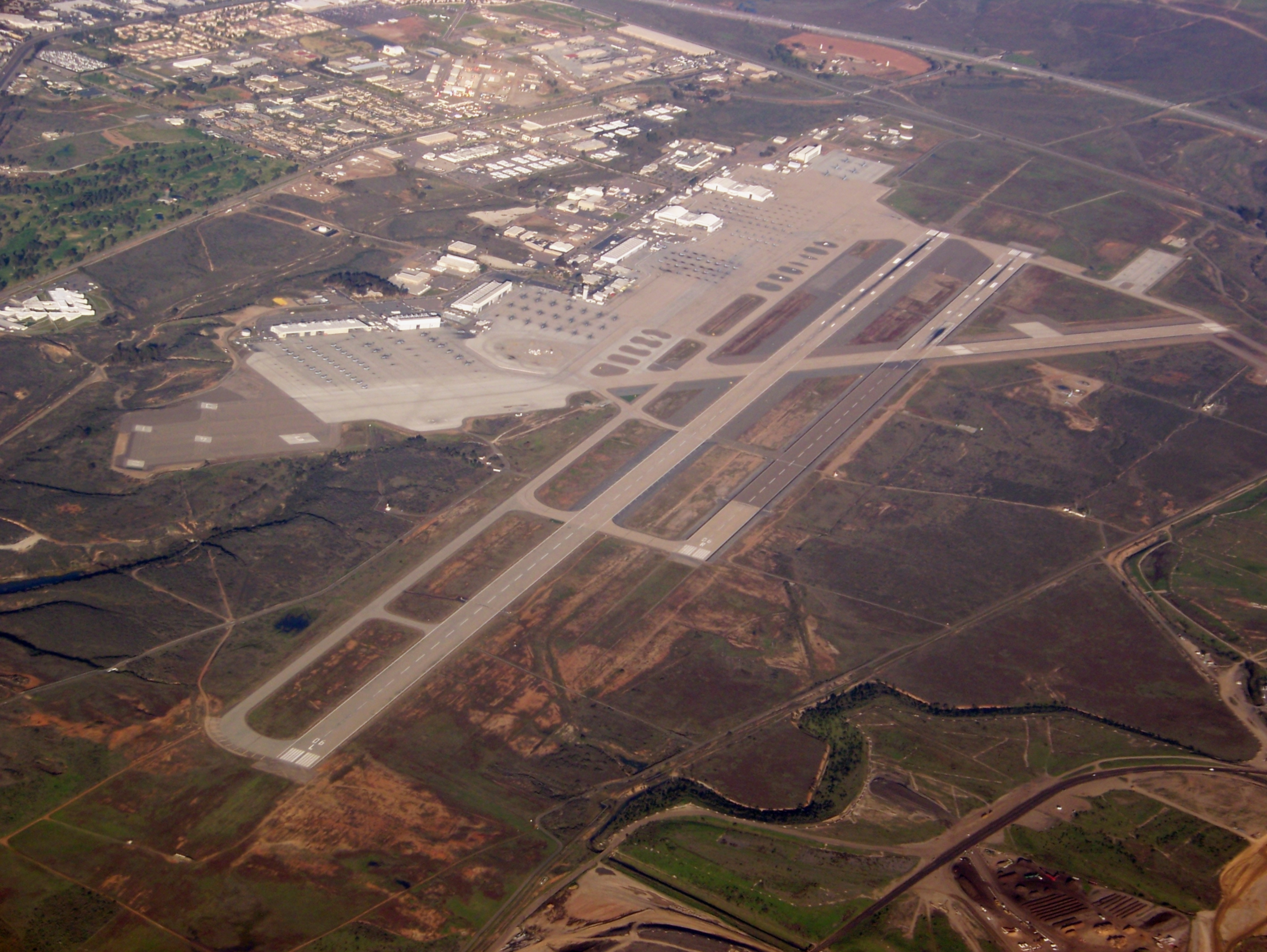
- An aerial view of MCAS Miramar during 2008

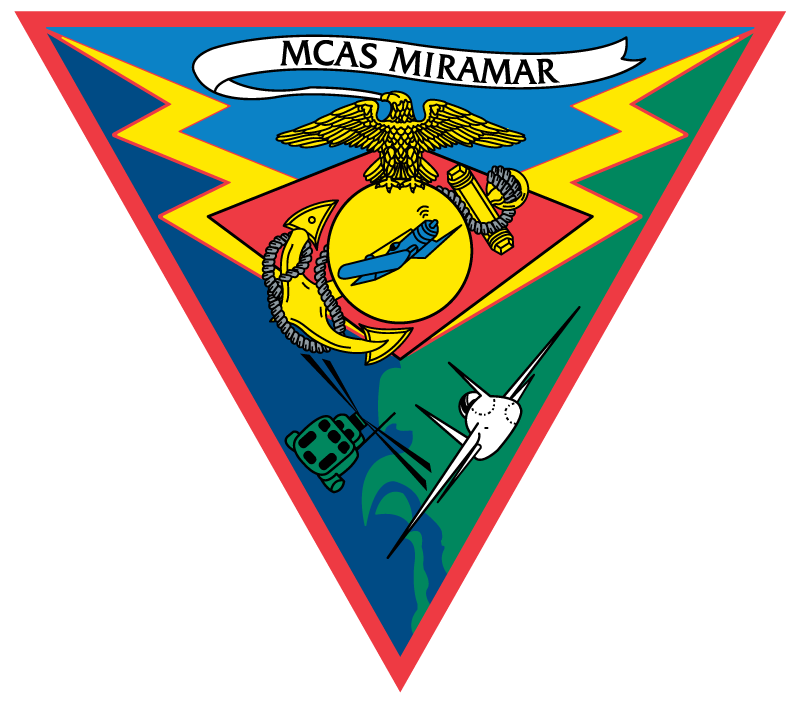

Site information
- Type: Marine Corps Air Station
- Owner: Department of Defense
- Operator: US Marine Corps
- Controlled by: 3rd Marine Aircraft Wing
- Condition: Operational
- Website: www.miramar.marines.mil

Location
- Location in the United States
- Coordinates: 32°52′04″N 117°08′30″W

Site history
- Built: 1917 (as Camp Kearny)
- In use: 1917 – 1920; 1929 – present

Garrison information
- Current commander: Colonel R. Erik Herrmann
- Garrison: Marine Aircraft Group 11; Marine Aircraft Group 16; Marine Air Control Group 38

Airfield information
- Identifiers: IATA: NKX, ICAO: KNKX, FAA LID: NKX, WMO: 722930
- Elevation: 145.3 metres (477 ft) AMSL
Runways
Direction	Length and surface
6L/24R	3,657.6 metres (12,000 ft) concrete
6R/24L	2,438.7 metres (8,001 ft) porous European mix
Helicopter strip (LHD)	304.8 metres (1,000 ft)
Helipads
Number	Length and surface
1	30 metres (98 ft)
2	30 metres (98 ft)
3	30 metres (98 ft)
4	38 metres (125 ft)
5	38 metres (125 ft)

Marine Corps Air Station Miramar (MCAS Miramar) (IATA: NKX, ICAO: KNKX, FAA LID: NKX) is a United States Marine Corps installation that is home to the 3rd Marine Aircraft Wing, which is the aviation element of the I Marine Expeditionary Force. It is located in Miramar, a community of San Diego, California, about 14 miles (23 km) north of downtown San Diego.

The airfield was named Mitscher Field from 1955 to 2017 after Admiral M. A. Mitscher, who was the commander of Task Force 58 during World War II., In 2017, it was renamed Joe Foss Field after World War II Marine Corps fighter ace and Medal of Honor recipient, Joe Foss, a Marine Corps Major who transferred his commission to the South Dakota Air National Guard following World War II and later retired from the U.S. Air Force as a Brigadier General in the Air National Guard.

The air station is the former location of Pacific Fleet fighter and Airborne Early Warning and Control aircraft (F-4 Phantom II, F-14 Tomcat, E-2 Hawkeye) and is best known as the former location of the United States Navy Fighter Weapons School (NFWS), its TOPGUN training program and the movie of the same name. In 1996, NFWS was relocated to Naval Air Station Fallon in western Nevada, 60 miles east of Reno, and merged into the Naval Strike and Air Warfare Center (NSAWC). During the heyday of TOPGUN at NAS Miramar, the station was nicknamed "Fightertown USA".

== Geography ==
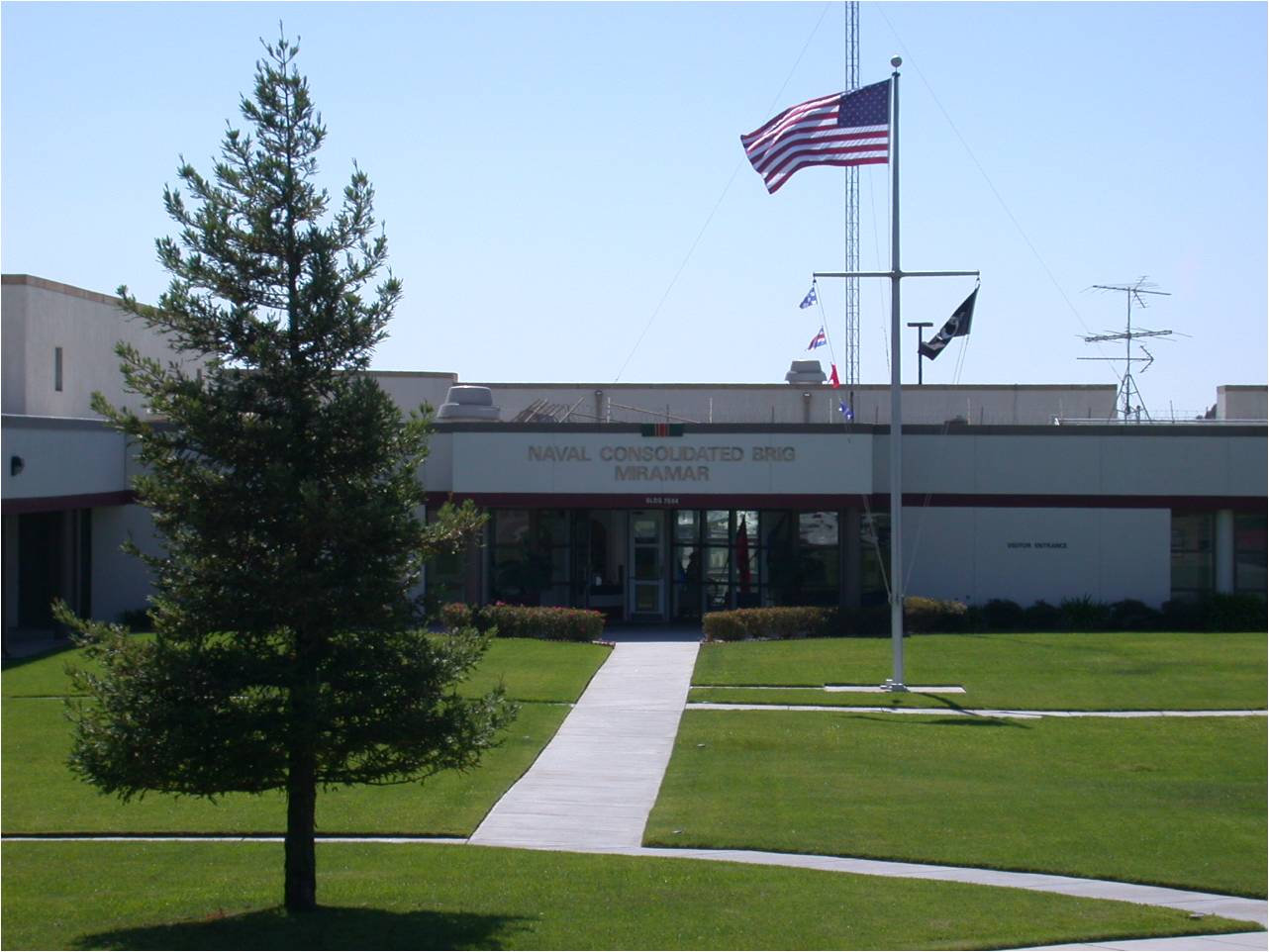
Naval Consolidated Brig, Miramar

The base contains 23,116 acres (93.55 km^{2}). It is bisected by Kearny Villa Road and Interstate 15. The area east of Kearny Villa Road, called "East Miramar", is undeveloped and is used for military training. Miramar is recognized as the world's largest Master Jet Air Station.

== History ==
Kumeyaay Native Americans were the first inhabitants in the vicinity of the base. Spain claimed the San Diego area in 1542 and colonized it beginning in 1769. In 1846, the crown issued a land grant that included the area of the current base to Don Santiago Argüello. After the American Civil War, the land was divided and sold to people such as Edward Scripps, a newspaper publisher from the eastern United States, who developed a ranch on the site. It was Scripps who named the area Miramar, meaning "view of the sea". The land was predominantly used for grazing and farming into the early 20th century.

=== 1918–1941 ===
During World War I, the U.S. Army acquired 12,721 acres (5,148 ha) of land in the Miramar Ranch area, on a mesa north of San Diego. Camp Kearny was opened on 18 January 1917 and was named after Stephen W. Kearny, who was commander of the Army of the West during the Mexican–American War. The base was primarily used to train infantrymen on their way to the battlefields of Europe. During World War I, an airstrip was never built on the property, although Army and U.S. Navy aircraft from Naval Air Station North Island did land on the parade deck. Following the Armistice, the base was used to demobilize servicemen and was closed on 20 October 1920. More than 1,200 buildings were demolished when the camp closed.

Charles Lindbergh's Spirit of St. Louis airplane was built in nearby San Diego. Lindbergh used the abandoned Camp Kearny parade field to practice landings and take-offs before making his historic solo flight across the Atlantic Ocean.

During the 1930s, the Navy briefly used the air base for helium dirigibles. In 1932, a mooring mast and hangar were built at the camp for the dirigibles, but when the program was abandoned, the base was quiet again.

=== World War II ===
By the time World War II began, Miramar was already undergoing a "precautionary" renovation. Camp Holcomb (later renamed Camp Elliott) was built on part of old Camp Kearny, to be used for U.S Marine Corps artillery and machine gun training. Camp Elliott became home to Fleet Marine Force Training Center, West Coast, and the 2nd Marine Division, charged with defending the California coast. Runways were constructed in 1940, and the 1st Marine Air Wing arrived on 21 December of that year. The Navy commissioned Naval Auxiliary Air Station (NAAS) Camp Kearny in February 1943, specifically to train crews for the Consolidated PB4Y-2 Privateer, which was built less than 10 miles (16 km) away in San Diego. A month later, the Marines established Marine Corps Air Depot Camp Kearny, later renamed Marine Corps Air Depot Miramar, to avoid confusion with the Navy facility.

The big Privateers proved too heavy for the asphalt concrete runway the Army had installed in 1936 and the longer runways built in 1940, so the Navy added two concrete runways in 1943.

During the 1940s, both the Navy and the Marine Corps occupied Miramar. East Miramar (Camp Elliott) was used to train Marine artillery and armored personnel, while Navy and Marine Corps pilots trained on the western side. The bases were combined and designated Marine Corps Air Station Miramar in 1946.

=== Naval Air Station ===
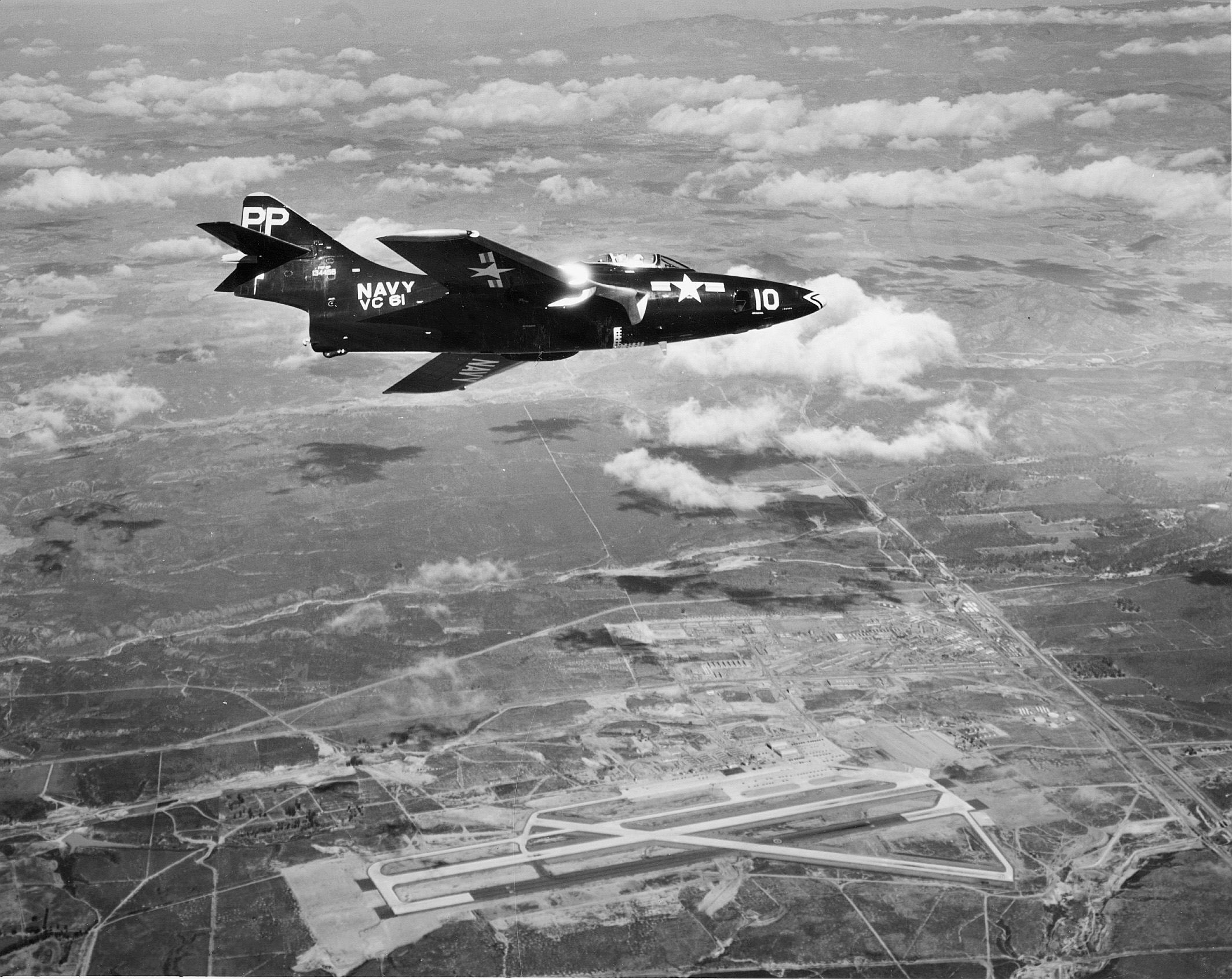
NAS Miramar in 1954

In 1947, the Marines moved to MCAS El Toro in Orange County, California, and Miramar was redesignated as NAAS Miramar (Naval Auxiliary Air Station Miramar). It became NAS Miramar (Naval Air Station Miramar) on 1 March 1952. In 1954, the Navy offered NAS Miramar to San Diego for $1 and the city considered using the base to relocate its airport. But it was deemed at the time to be too far away from most residents and the offer was declined.

Only the western half of Miramar's facilities were put to use; the old east station began to deteriorate, with many buildings sold as scrap. Miramar found new life as a Navy Master Jet Station in the 1950s. The eastern half, former Camp Elliot, was used by the United States Air Force for Project Orion (having been transferred temporarily), and later by NASA; it was the site of several launches. The base really came into its own during the Vietnam War. The Navy needed a school to train pilots in dog-fighting and in fleet air defense. In 1969, the United States Navy Fighter Weapons School was established organizationally as part of VF-121, which was then the F-4 Phantom Fleet Replacement Aviation Maintenance Personnel (FRAMP), which trained the maintainers who joined the fleet as qualified "Phantom Phixeres".

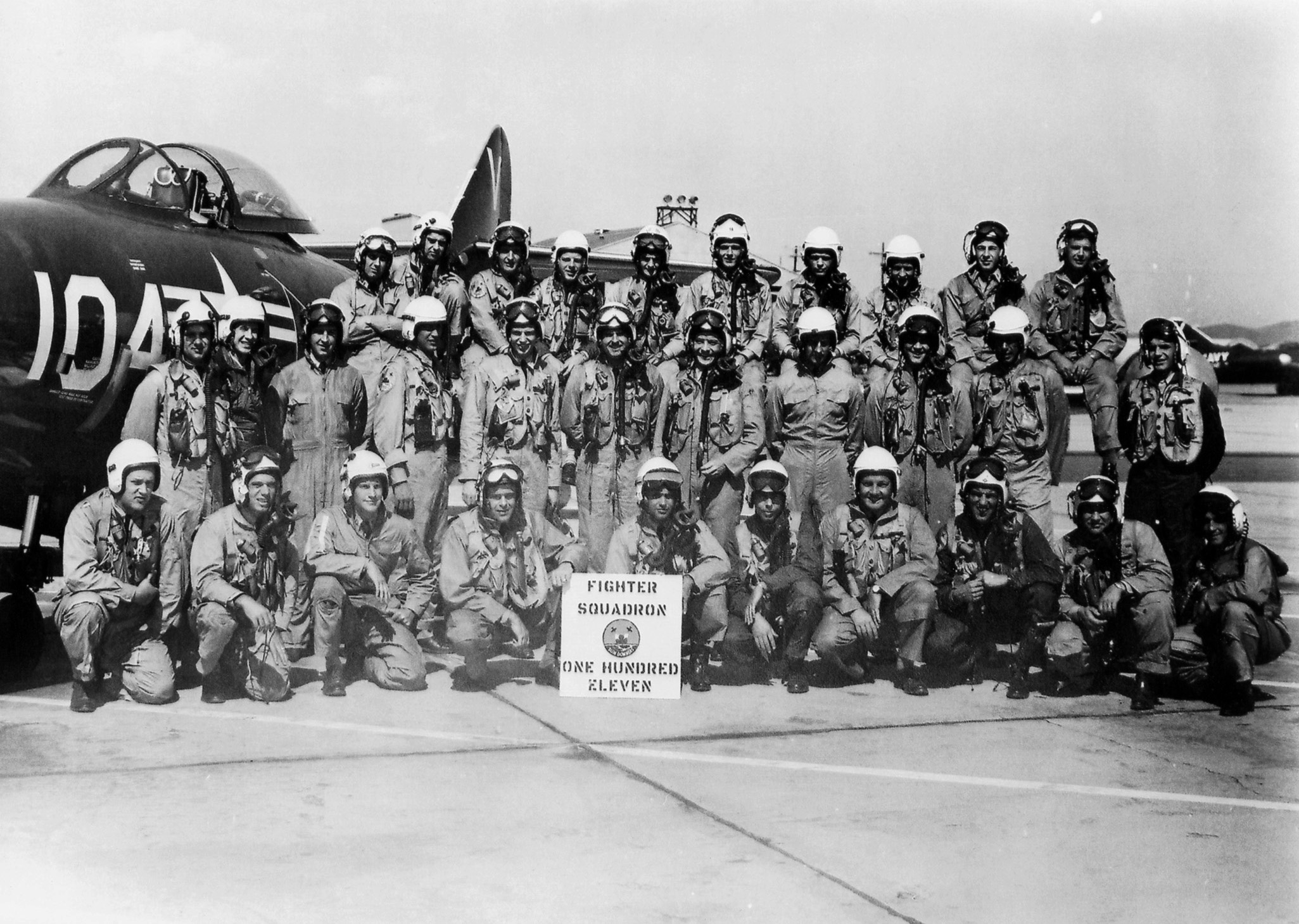
VF-111 pilots at NAS Miramar

In October 1972, Miramar welcomed the F-14 Tomcat and fighter squadron VF-124, a former Fleet Replacement Squadron (FRS) tasked with the mission to train new Tomcat crews. Formerly, VF-124 had been training pilots in the F-8 Crusader. That task was handed over to Light Photographic Squadron 63 (VFP-63) that then became "Crusader College" The first two operational Tomcat squadrons, VF-1 known as the "Wolfpack" and VF-2 known as the "Bounty Hunters," trained here before deploying aboard USS Enterprise (CVN-65) in 1974.

NAS Miramar was also the west coast E-2 squadrons home. VAW-110 the west coast fleet replacement squadron and fleet squadrons VAW-112, VAW-113, VAW-114 (disestablished 1995), VAW-116 and VAW-117. With the change to MCAS Miramar, the training squadron was disestablished and moved to NAS Norfolk, Virginia. The fleet squadrons were moved to NAS Point Mugu, California.

=== 1990s–Present: Marine Corps Air Station ===
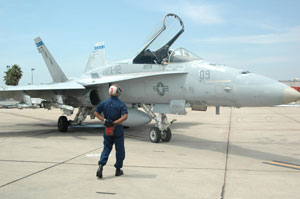
F/A-18 Hornet on the flight line at MCAS Miramar

In 1993, the Base Realignment and Closure (BRAC) commission recommended that MCAS El Toro and MCAS Tustin be closed down and that NAS Miramar be transferred to the Marine Corps. BRAC also recommended that all Navy Pacific Fleet F-14 aircraft and squadrons (with the exception of those assigned to Carrier Air Wing 5 in Japan) and Pacific Fleet F-14 training be consolidated with the Atlantic Fleet and be relocated to NAS Oceana, Virginia. BRAC recommended that Pacific Fleet E-2C training be consolidated with Atlantic Fleet E-2C training at NAS Norfolk, that all Pacific Fleet E-2C aircraft and squadrons (with the exception of those assigned to Carrier Air Wing 5 in Japan) be relocated to NAS Point Mugu, and that the Naval Fighter Weapons School (TOPGUN) and Navy Reserve adversary squadron VFC-13 be relocated to NAS Fallon, Nevada.

In 1999, MCAS El Toro and MCAS Tustin were closed and the 3rd Marine Aircraft Wing returned to Miramar when it officially became Marine Corps Air Station Miramar. On 1 October 1997, Colonel Thomas A. Caughlan became the first Marine commanding officer of MCAS Miramar since World War II. Caughlan was also the last commanding officer of MCAS Tustin.

In 2005, the BRAC Commission directed instructor pilots and support personnel from Miramar to Eglin AFB in Florida, sufficient to stand up the Marine Corps' portion of the F-35 Lightning II Joint Strike Fighter program (JSF) Training Site. This will lead to an eventual phasing out of fighter pilot training at Miramar by 2015 as the F/A-18 Hornets are retired.

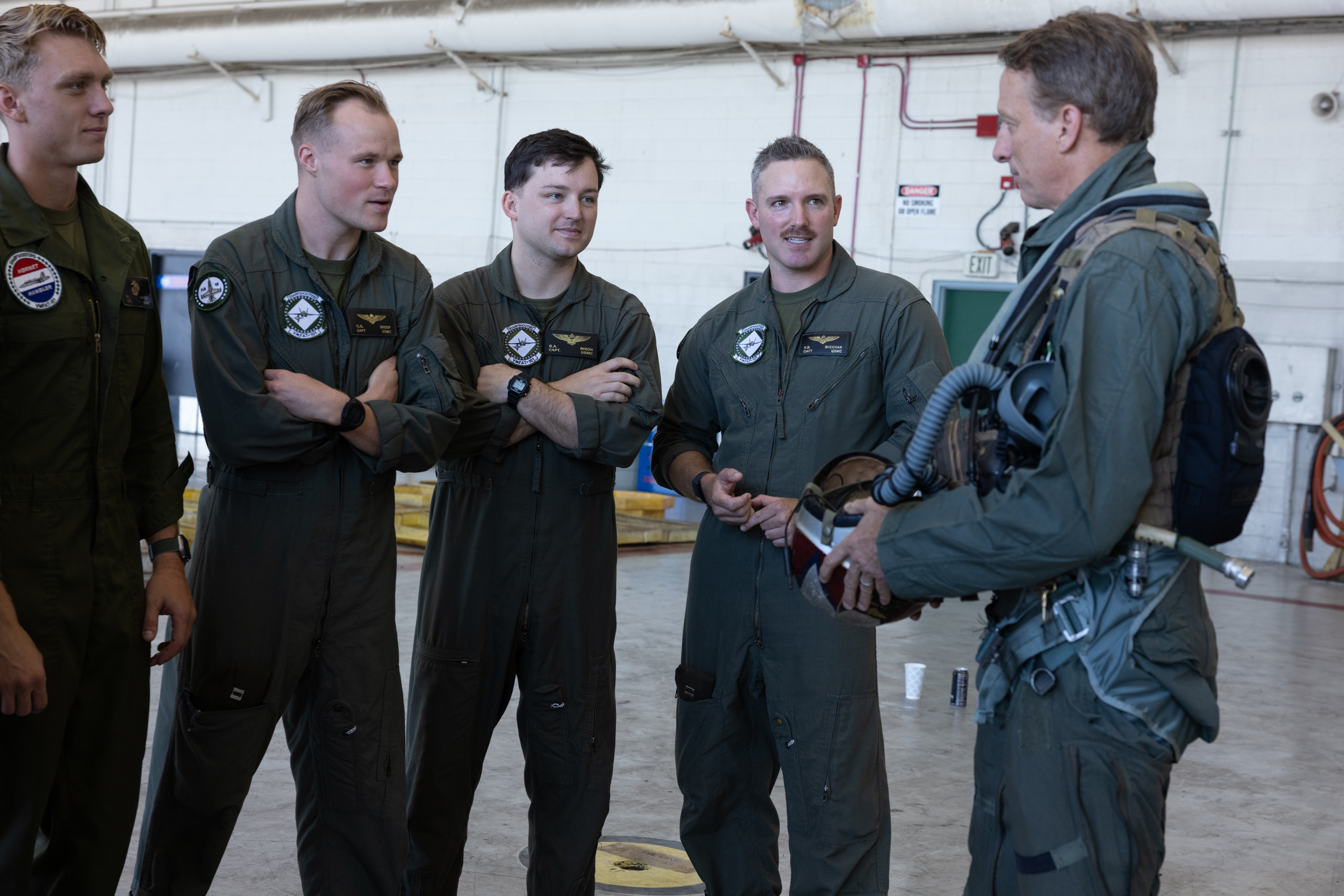
Members of VMFAT-101, the Marine Corps' F/A-18 Hornet training squadron at MCAS Miramar in August 2023

In 2006, the San Diego County Proposition A proposed obtaining 3000 acres (12 km^{2}) at MCAS Miramar to develop a commercial airport. The proposition was defeated 62 percent opposed to 38 percent in favor.

=== Noise ===
Numerous noise complaints have been lodged against MCAS Miramar (and its predecessor, NAS Miramar) going back for decades funded partly by real estate developers (Pardee Construction Co). MCAS Miramar is located near the center of the City of San Diego. It is surrounded on three sides by residential areas including Mira Mesa, Scripps Ranch, University City, Clairemont, and Tierrasanta. MCAS Miramar has a web site and phone number that people can call to register complaints about noise. To lessen the noise impact to the community, MCAS Miramar has made adjustments to their operations over the years, including the use of hush-houses, limitations on engine run-ups, and modification to flight plans. In spite of efforts, noise complaints remain an issue in 2019.

== Tenant Squadrons ==
Flying units based at MCAS Miramar:

Insignia	Squadron	Code	Callsign/Nickname	Assigned Aircraft	Operational Assignment
	Marine Fighter Attack Training Squadron 502	VMFAT-502	Flying Nightmares	F-35B	3rd Marine Aircraft Wing
	Marine Fighter Attack Squadron 314	VMFA-314	Black Knights	F-35C	Carrier Air Wing 9/ 3rd Marine Aircraft Wing
	Marine Fighter Attack Squadron 311	VMFA-311	Tomcats	F-35C	3rd Marine Aircraft Wing
	Marine Fighter Attack Squadron 323	VMFA-323	Death Rattlers	F/A-18C	3rd Marine Aircraft Wing
	Marine Fighter Attack Squadron 232	VMFA-232	Red Devils	F/A-18C/D	3rd Marine Aircraft Wing
	Marine Aerial Refueler Transport Squadron 352	VMGR-352	Raiders	KC-130	3rd Marine Aircraft Wing
	Marine Heavy Helicopter Squadron 361	HMH-361	Flying Tigers	CH-53E	3rd Marine Aircraft Wing
	Marine Heavy Helicopter Squadron 462	HMH-462	Heavy Haulers	CH-53E	3rd Marine Aircraft Wing
	Marine Heavy Helicopter Squadron 465	HMH-465	Warhorse	CH-53E	3rd Marine Aircraft Wing
	Marine Heavy Helicopter Squadron 466	HMH-466	Wolfpack	CH-53E	3rd Marine Aircraft Wing
	Marine Medium Tiltrotor Squadron 161	VMM-161	Greyhawks	MV-22B	3rd Marine Aircraft Wing
	Marine Medium Tiltrotor Squadron 163	VMM-163	Evil Eyes	MV-22B	3rd Marine Aircraft Wing
	Marine Medium Tiltrotor Squadron 165	VMM-165	White Knights	MV-22B	3rd Marine Aircraft Wing
	Marine Medium Tiltrotor Squadron 362	VMM-362	Ugly Angels	MV-22B	3rd Marine Aircraft Wing

== Based units ==
Flying and notable non-flying units based at MCAS Miramar:

=== United States Marine Corps ===
Marine Corps Installations – West

- Headquarters and Headquarters Squadron – UC-12W Huron and UC-35D Citation

1st Marine Logistics Group

- Combat Logistics Regiment 15 (CLR-15)
  - Combat Logistics Company 11 (CLC-11)

3rd Marine Aircraft Wing

- Marine Wing Headquarters Squadron 3
- Marine Air Control Group 38
  - Marine Tactical Air Command Squadron 38
  - Marine Wing Communications Squadron 38
- Marine Aircraft Group 11
  - Marine Aerial Refueller Squadron 352 (VMGR-352) – KC-130J Hercules
  - Marine Aviation Logistics Squadron 11 (MALS-11)
  - Marine Fighter Attack Squadron 232 (VMFA-232) – F/A-18C/D Hornet
  - Marine Fighter Attack Squadron 311 (VMFA-311) – F-35C Lightning II
  - Marine Fighter Attack Squadron 314 (VMFA-314) – F-35C Lightning II
  - Marine Fighter Attack Squadron 323 (VMFA-323) – F/A-18C Hornet
  - Marine Fighter Attack Training Squadron 502 (VMFAT-502)– F-35B Lightning II
- Marine Aircraft Group 16
  - Marine Aviation Logistics Squadron 16 (MALS-16)
  - Marine Heavy Helicopter Squadron 361 (HMH-361) – CH-53E Super Stallion
  - Marine Heavy Helicopter Squadron 462 (HMH-462) – CH-53E Super Stallion
  - Marine Heavy Helicopter Squadron 465 (HMH-465) – CH-53E Super Stallion
  - Marine Heavy Helicopter Squadron 466 (HMH-466) – CH-53E Super Stallion
  - Marine Medium Tilt-Rotor Squadron 161 (VMM-161) – MV-22B Osprey
  - Marine Medium Tilt-Rotor Squadron 163 (VMM-163) – MV-22B Osprey
  - Marine Medium Tilt-Rotor Squadron 165 (VMM-165) – MV-22B Osprey
  - Marine Medium Tilt-Rotor Squadron 362 (VMM-362) – MV-22B Osprey
  - Marine Medium Tilt-Rotor Squadron 764 (VMM-764) – MV-22B Osprey
- Marine Wing Support Group 37
  - Marine Wing Support Squadron 373 (MWSS-373)

=== United States Navy ===
Navy Personnel Command

- Naval Consolidated Brig Miramar

=== United States Air Force ===
Air Force Materiel Command (AFMC)

- Air Force Installation and Mission Support Center
  - Air Force Security Forces Center
    - Detachment 2 (GSU)

== Crashes ==
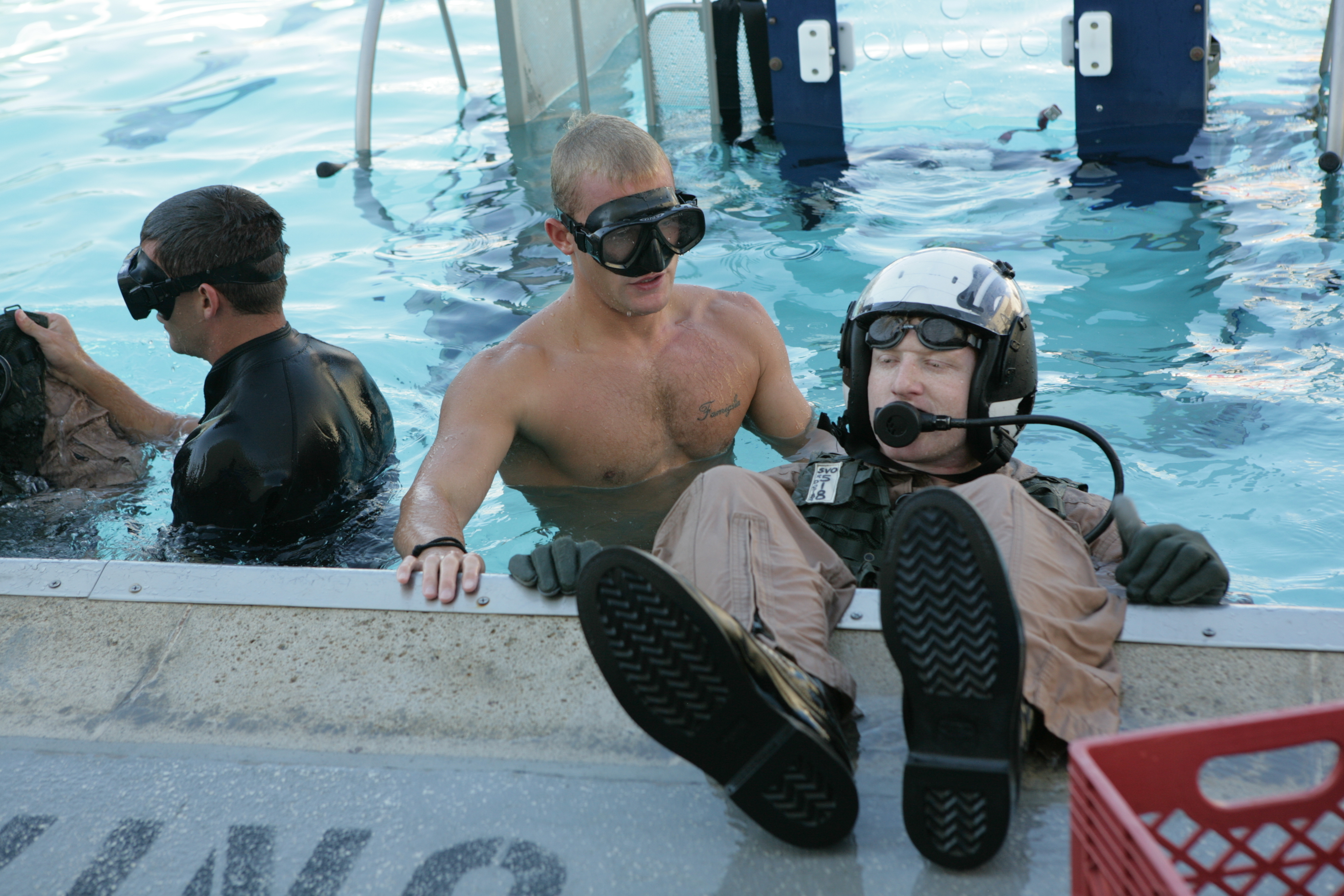
Airmen at Miramar training for the worst-case scenario

There have been a number of aviation accidents:

- On 4 December 1959, an F3H Demon with Navy pilot ENS Albert Joe Hickman crashed into the adjoining community of Clairemont Mesa. The pilot stayed with the aircraft to avoid hitting a school. The city named an elementary school in Mira Mesa after him.
- On 12 August 1968, a U.S. Navy Vought F-8 Crusader (F-8C) fighter jet of VF-124 crashed while returning to (then) NAS Miramar, from nighttime Sidewinder missile training with three other F-8 Crusader fighters. The pilot, LT (JG) Roman S. Ohnemus, 25, did not eject, and died in the crash. The incident occurred in the dark, early morning hours in remote, brush-covered terrain off what is now Canyon Hills Park and Spitfire Way in Mira Mesa(somewhat level except for narrow valleys), north of (then) NAS Miramar, and Miramar Road, west of U.S. Highway 395 (now Interstate 15), and south of Black Mountain. A small brush fire was started by the crash. Live missiles presented a dangerous crash site to the first-arriving state forestry firefighters, who were woken by the crash. They were from the nearby fire station located at Carroll Canyon and then Highway 395 (between 1 and 2 miles) Miramar California Division of Forestry (now CalFire) fire station.
- On 22 December 1969, an F-8J Crusader of VF-194 crashed into a hangar at NAS Miramar, after the pilot ejected. 14 died and 30 were injured. Pilot Lt. C. M. Riddell ejected safely. Five other fighters, including two F-4 Phantoms, were damaged in the repair facility fire that ensued. Helicopters and military and civilian ambulances were used to transport the injured to Balboa Naval Hospital, San Diego.
- On 27 March 1978, an F-14 Tomcat from VF-1 crashed into I-15 just short of the runway and was stopped on the northbound lanes by a concrete divider. One aviator in the Tomcat was killed.
- On 7 November 1978, an A-4 Skyhawk used by the Navy Flight Demonstration Squadron, the Blue Angels, crashed and the pilot was killed.
- On 11 March 1985, an F-8 Crusader crashed into a parking lot of a nearby industrial park. The pilot ejected safely.
- On 3 December 1985, U.S. Navy Capt Henry M. Kleeman was killed when his F/A-18 Hornet skidded 5000 feet and flipped on a wet runway.
- On 21 March 1987 an F-14 Tomcat crashed just south of Poway Road, into the canyons of what is now the Mercy Road area, approximately 4 miles from the base. Both crewmembers ejected safely.
- On 26 June 1987, an A-3 Skywarrior from VQ-1 was practicing night Field Carrier Landing Practice (FCLP) - The aircraft impacted the ground after turning downwind subsequent to take off. Three crewmembers were killed.
- On 11 March 2004, a UC-35 crashed on east Miramar at the approach end of the runway. Four Marines were killed.
- In November 2006, an F/A-18D Hornet from VMFAT-101 crashed on the eastern perimeter of the base, with the pilot ejecting safely.
- On 8 December 2008, four people were killed, two homes were destroyed and three homes were damaged when an F/A-18D Hornet crashed about 2 miles (3.2 km) from the base. The plane was returning from training exercises with the USS Abraham Lincoln, which was off the coast of San Diego. The pilot was attempting to steer the aircraft to an unpopulated area when he lost all engine, electrical and hydraulic power. He ejected safely.
- On 24 August 2023, an F/A-18 Hornet crashed east of the base close to the I-15. The sole pilot aboard died after ejecting from the aircraft.

== Miramar National Cemetery ==
On 30 January 2010, the Department of Veterans Affairs dedicated a new National Cemetery at the northwest corner of MCAS Miramar. The cemetery is an extension of Fort Rosecrans National Cemetery and when complete will accommodate approximately 235,000 deceased veterans and spouses.

== Attractions ==
A MAGTF demonstration for the gathered crowds at the 2026 Miramar Airshow.

- MCAS Miramar was home to the Flying Leatherneck Aviation Museum, which closed in 2021.
- The Miramar Airshow is a major airshow held each year at MCAS Miramar the last weekend of September. https://miramarairshow.com/

== See also ==
- Kearny Mesa, where MCAS Miramar is located
- List of United States Marine Corps installations
- List of airports in California
- Pogogyne abramsii is an endangered plant found on the grounds of MCAS Miramar.
- United States Marine Corps Aviation
- San Diego International Airport is another airport located in San Diego.

== Bibliography ==
- O'Hara, Thomas (2005). Images of America – Marine Corps Air Station Miramar. Charleston, SC: Arcadia. ISBN 0-7385-3058-1.
- Sherrod, Robert (1952). History of Marine Corps Aviation in World War II. Washington, D.C.: Combat Forces Press.
- Shettle, M. L. (2001). United States Marine Corps Air Stations of World War II. Bowersville, Georgia: Schaertel Publishing Company. ISBN 0-9643388-2-3.
