= Hush house =

Facility for testing aircraft systems

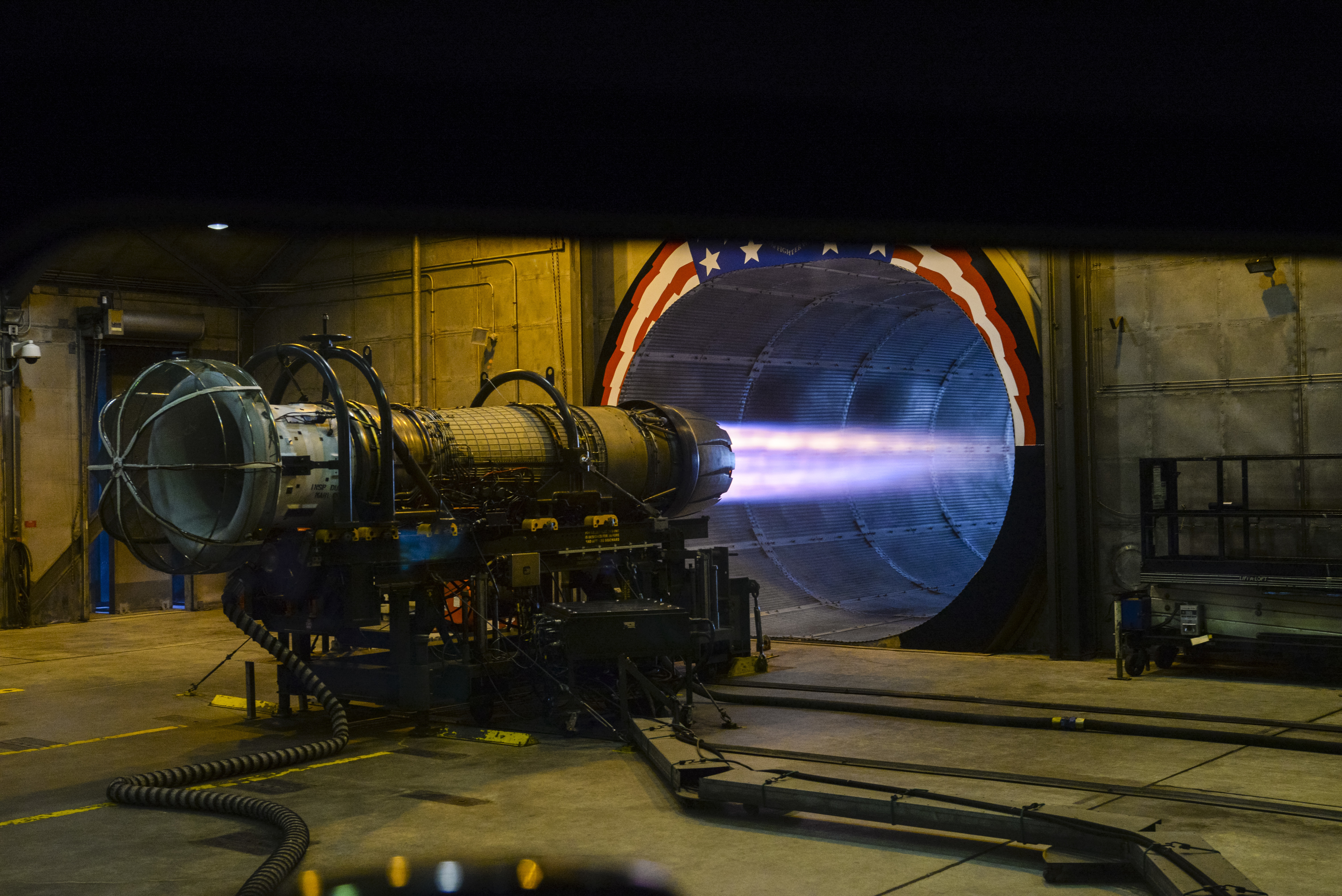
A General Electric F110 engine tested at full afterburner in a hush house

A hush house is an enclosed, noise-suppressed facility used for testing aircraft systems, including propulsion, mechanics, electronics, pneumatics, and others. Installed or uninstalled jet engines can be run under actual load conditions.

== Testing ==
A hush house is large enough to accommodate an entire crewed or uncrewed aircraft. Some facilities are also equipped to test additional capabilities such as weight and balance, night vision and low lighting, water intrusion, heat soaking, and wind evaluation.

Jet engines can be run while installed in the aircraft, which must be restrained by holdback devices to resist the engine thrust. Engines removed from an airplane can be tested while held in place by thrust frames.

The air intake and exhaust systems of indoor engine test cells and hush houses are designed to block the transmission of noise, while optimizing the engine air flows. The engine exhaust, after having been thoroughly mixed with cooling air, is generally discharged through a vertical stack. The gas path incorporates acoustic damping panels (often containing fibrous insulation protected from gas stream erosion by metal mesh) to reduce the sound energy of the gas stream and attenuate the noise transmitted to the surrounding outdoor area.

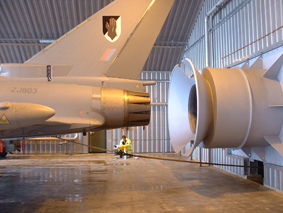
A Eurofighter Typhoon in a hush house facility with an air-cooled exhaust detuner

Because the engine exhaust flow is "augmented" with a relatively large flow of cooling air induced by a Venturi effect into the exhaust silencing system, the exhaust muffler of an indoor test facility is generally referred to as an augmenter tube, although the term "detuner" is commonly used in the UK.

Some outdoor run-up facilities used to test aircraft engines (installed or uninstalled) may also be outfitted with noise control structures, called Ground Run-Up Enclosures.

== Examples ==
- Marine Corps Air Station Miramar in San Diego California
- Marine Corps Air Station Iwakuni in Japan
- Naval Air Station Jacksonville in Jacksonville, Florida
- Naval Air Station Joint Reserve Base Fort Worth in Fort Worth, Texas
- Naval Air Station Oceana in Virginia Beach, Virginia
- Naval Air Station Patuxent River in Maryland
