= 2008 San Diego F/A-18 crash =

Crash in San Diego, California on December 8, 2008

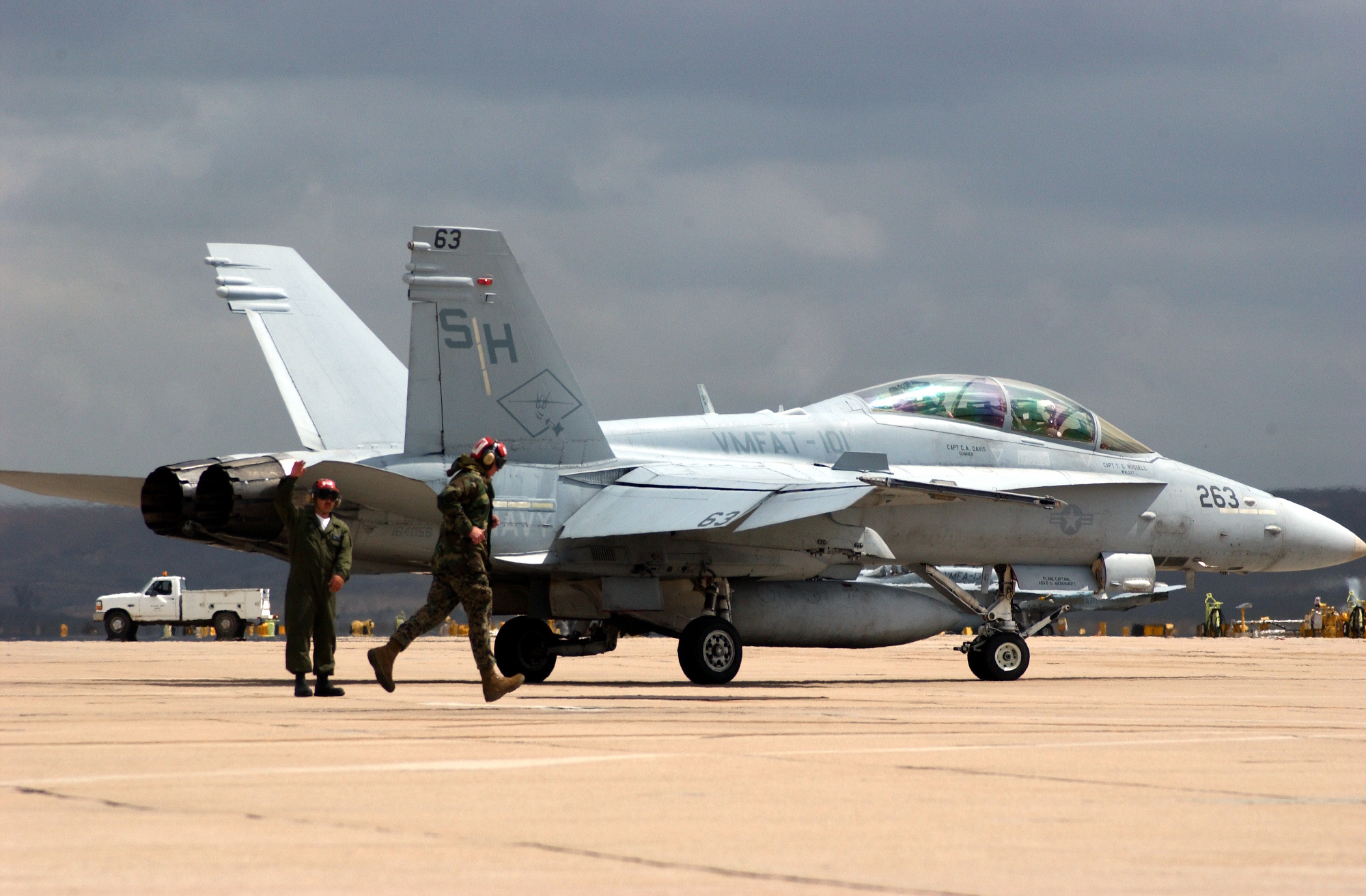
- An F/A-18D from VMFAT-101, similar to aircraft involved in the accident

Accident
- Date: December 8, 2008
- Summary: Mechanical failure due to inadequate maintenance compounded by human errors
- Site: University City, San Diego, California; 32°51′38″N 117°11′54″W
- Total fatalities: 4
- Total survivors: 1

Aircraft
- Aircraft type: McDonnell Douglas F/A-18 Hornet
- Operator: United States Marine Corps
- Registration: 164017
- Flight origin: USS Abraham Lincoln (CVN-72)
- Destination: Marine Corps Air Station Miramar
- Occupants: 1
- Passengers: 0
- Crew: 1
- Fatalities: 0
- Survivors: 1

Ground casualties
- Ground fatalities: 4

On December 8, 2008, a United States Marine Corps (USMC) F/A-18 Hornet crashed in a residential area of San Diego, California. The pilot, First Lieutenant Dan Neubauer (28) from VMFAT-101, was the only crewmember on board the two-seat aircraft; he successfully ejected from the aircraft, landing in a tree. The jet crashed into the University City residential area, destroying two houses and damaging a third. A total of four residents in one house, two adults and two children, were killed.

A USMC investigation concluded that poor maintenance caused the engine malfunction. Errors by the pilot and USMC personnel on the ground led to the aircraft crashing into the San Diego residential neighborhood. As a result, in early 2009, the pilot was temporarily grounded and thirteen other officers and enlisted personnel were relieved and/or disciplined. The Marine Corps notified other F/A-18 squadrons of the engine and fuel problems discovered during the investigation.

== Accident ==
On December 8, 2008 Lt Neubauer was piloting an F/A-18D-30-MC Hornet (Lot 12), BuNo 164017, from VMFAT-101, based at MCAS Miramar. Along with several other VMFAT-101 aircraft, he was conducting day and night carrier qualifications (catapult launches and tailhook arrested carrier landings) aboard the aircraft carrier USS Abraham Lincoln offshore 60 miles southwest of San Diego. Neubauer was the only crewmember on board the two-seat aircraft.

After taking off from the carrier at 11:11 a.m., Neubauer reported an oil caution light for the right engine, and shut it down after efforts to clear the problem failed. After declaring an emergency, he was first directed towards Naval Air Station North Island, but was redirected by superior officers to his home base of MCAS Miramar when about 20 miles (32 km) away from North Island. Neubauer attempted to make an arrested landing at Miramar but the jet lost power in its operating engine while on final approach. Eyewitnesses reported the jet flew slowly eastbound at a low altitude and was dumping fuel (which is not uncommon for an emergency landing). The pilot said that as he broke through the clouds at 2,500 feet (760 m), his left engine's thrust slipped dangerously low, and he unsuccessfully tried to restart the right engine. The left engine lost more thrust, before its generator dropped offline and the jet lost electrical power.

The jet flew over University City High School and crashed into the residential area just past the school about two miles from the Miramar's runway 6L. Neubauer waited "until the last possible moment" to eject from the plane, bailing out at an altitude of just 400 feet (120 m), having attempted to steer away from homes on the ground before the crash. He ejected successfully, landing in a tree in Rose Canyon, just behind a home. The jet crashed into the University City residential area at Cather Ave and Huggins St (between the high school and exit 24 of Interstate 805), destroying two houses and damaging three others. A total of four residents in one house, two adults and two children, were killed.

Neubauer was taken to Naval Medical Center San Diego, a military hospital and treated for unspecified mild injuries, and reported being "horrified" by the crash at that time. Killed on the ground in one home were Youngmi Yoon, 36; her 15-month-old baby, Grace; her 2-month-old newborn daughter, Rachel; and her mother, Suk Im Kim, 60, who had recently arrived from South Korea to help care for her daughter's newborn. The other house destroyed belonged to John and Sunny Wu, who lived there with their two daughters Susan Wu and Alice Wu. None of the family was home at the time of the crash but the home and everything in it were lost.

== Aftermath ==
In the aftermath of the crash, University City residents renewed previous calls for the US military to relocate aircraft from the base to a more remote location. In a counterpoint, homeowners in University City signed disclosure forms saying they were aware of overflying jets and that this "...extraordinarily rare event...got enormous publicity [and] the risk of living in University City and having a plane fall on you is millions to one."

Marine commanders apologized for the crash and defended the decision to order Neubauer to land at Miramar instead of North Island, which isn't surrounded by residences, stating that double-engine failures are extremely rare. Said Colonel Christopher O'Connor, Miramar's commander, "We are not contemplating changing our emergency procedures at this time. We very seldom fly over the area. We take being good neighbors very seriously."

On December 15, 2008, Marine officials stationed in South Korea helped receive Suk Im Kim's remains at Incheon International Airport and transport them to her home in Damyang. The next day, United States Forces Korea commander General Walter L. Sharp sent a delegation to Kim's home headed by Republic of Korea Army Major General Yong-goo Jang and U.S. Marine Corps Major General Frank Panther to express condolences to Kim's son-in-law, Dong-yun Yoon.

As of July 2010, US$700,000 in claims had been paid by the government. Youngmi Yoon's husband, Dong Yun, publicly forgave Neubauer during a news conference the day after the crash. Said Sunny Wu of the crash, "I don't want to blame anybody. I think everyone makes mistakes sometimes. Just as long as you can learn from your mistake, it's fine."

In July 2010, represented by the Los Angeles law firm Panish Shea & Boyle LLP, Yoon sued Boeing and the United States government for $56 million. In the suit, Yoon alleges that the government violated many of its procedures in its operation of the mishap aircraft and that Boeing was responsible for the defects in the aircraft's fuel systems which caused the crash. Yoon later stated that the compensation offer from the US government for the loss of his four family members and his home was "insulting". Yoon's lawsuit against the US Navy was heard in a federal district court in San Diego in December 2011. On 28 December 2011, U.S. District Judge Jeffrey Miller awarded Yoon, his father-in-law, and mother-in-law's three adult children a total of $17.8 million in damage compensation from the U.S. government, the highest wrongful death judgment against the United States and 20th highest verdict to date.

The US government appealed the award but the appeal was voluntarily dismissed on March 20, 2012.

== Investigation ==
On March 3, 2009, an investigation by the Marine Corps concluded that the accident was preventable. The report was generally scathing in its criticism of the conduct of the participants, including the pilot. The commanding officer of the squadron, its maintenance officer, its operations officer, and the operations duty officer were relieved of duty as a result of the investigation. Nine other marines received other disciplinary action.

From the report, it appeared that the jet in question had a known track record of trouble in its left engine for several months. Maintenance was deferred after mechanics detected problems in the fuel flow system, a practice that was allowed at the time under established maintenance rules and procedures (since altered to forbid this practice); the aircraft had flown 146 times since the problem was identified. When the right engine was shut down for low oil pressure, the left engine did not receive enough fuel to produce sufficient thrust for flight, leading to the crash.

Following the pilot's report of the failure of the jet's right engine, controllers aboard Abraham Lincoln, as well as a civilian air traffic controller, directed the pilot to land at NAS North Island, the closest divert field. Squadron officials, however, ordered the pilot to land at MCAS Miramar after a brief discussion, which the investigation deemed "collectively bad decision-making by the duty officer, by the operations officer and by the squadron's commanding officer." The pilot also failed to consult his emergency procedures checklist during the emergency, as well as unnecessarily lengthening his approach to Miramar by making a 270-degree left turn after bypassing North Island, rather than a shorter 90-degree right turn. Specifically, the report criticized Neubauer for not questioning the order to divert to Miramar more forcefully, which he had briefly questioned. The squadron operations officials had underestimated the urgency of the situation, and placed undue emphasis on returning the pilot to his home field, having in mind the pilot's familiarity with that base, the longer runway, and better repair resources.

Despite criticism, Neubauer was returned to a probationary flight status and allowed to resume training in late April 2009, in a decision made by Lieutenant General George J. Trautman, III, the Deputy Commandant for Aviation.

== See also ==
- United States Marine Corps Aviation
- List of accidents and incidents involving military aircraft (2000–present)
