= Detuner (engine) =

Muffler to reduce noise from a jet engine

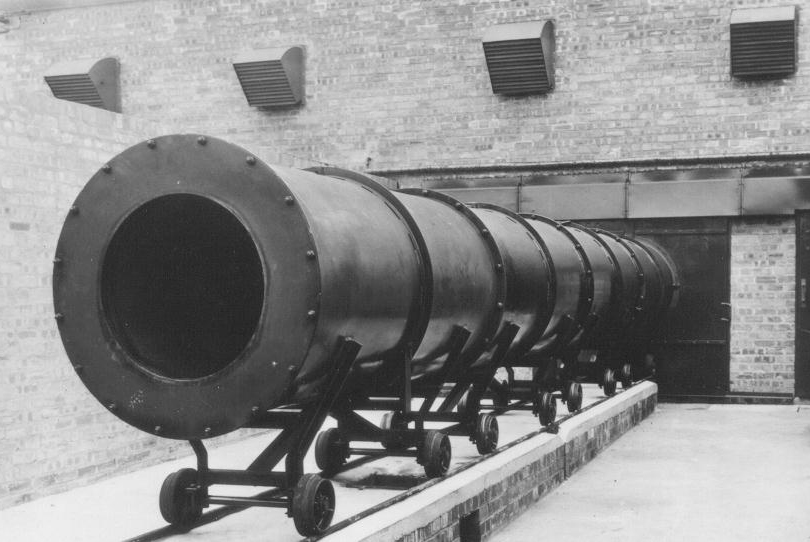
The first Cullum Detuner Mark IV c. 1944

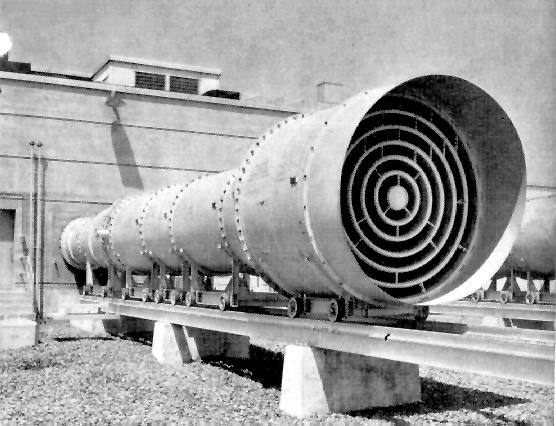
Cullum Mark V Detuner

Detuner is a generic term for a jet engine test cell exhaust system muffler.

Aircraft jet engine testing facilities typically require a means to vent and dampen the engine exhaust. The engine exhaust flow is "augmented" with a relatively large flow of cooling air induced by the Venturi effect into the exhaust silencing system, so the exhaust muffler is generally referred to as an "augmenter tube," or "detuner" (UK).

Interest by Douglas Jack W. Cullum in the noise generated by aircraft engines and propellers led to the design of a silencer for the W2 700 jet engine developed by Sir Frank Whittle and his team at Power Jets.

This original detuner was a straight-through silencer, a simple acoustic tube. A later version consisted of four acoustic sections with a plain entry section inside the test cell, flanged and bolted together, mounted on wheels, and installed on rails to permit fore and aft movement. Each acoustic section consisted of an inner and outer casing: the outer casing was plain mild steel plate and the inner casing was perforated mild steel plate. The cavity between inner lining and outer casing was tightly packed with an acoustic absorbent material known as rock (mineral) wool.

Modified versions of the prototype detuner were installed on the Rolls-Royce jet engine test beds at Clitheroe in Lancashire, Barnoldswick in Yorkshire and Derby, Derbyshire where the jet engine continued development.

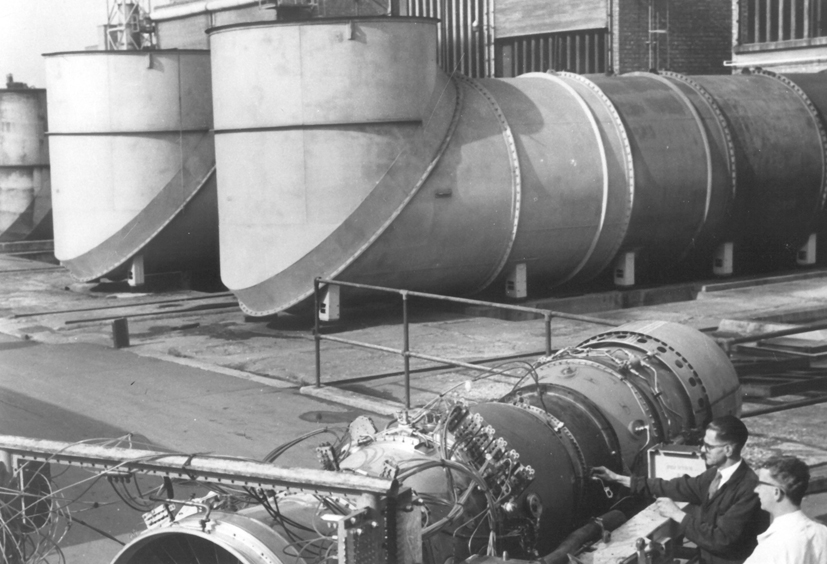
Detuners at Rolls-Royce, Derby

The development of the detuner was inextricably linked to the development of the jet engine. As the power of the engines increased, new detuners had to be developed to cope with larger and more powerful engines.

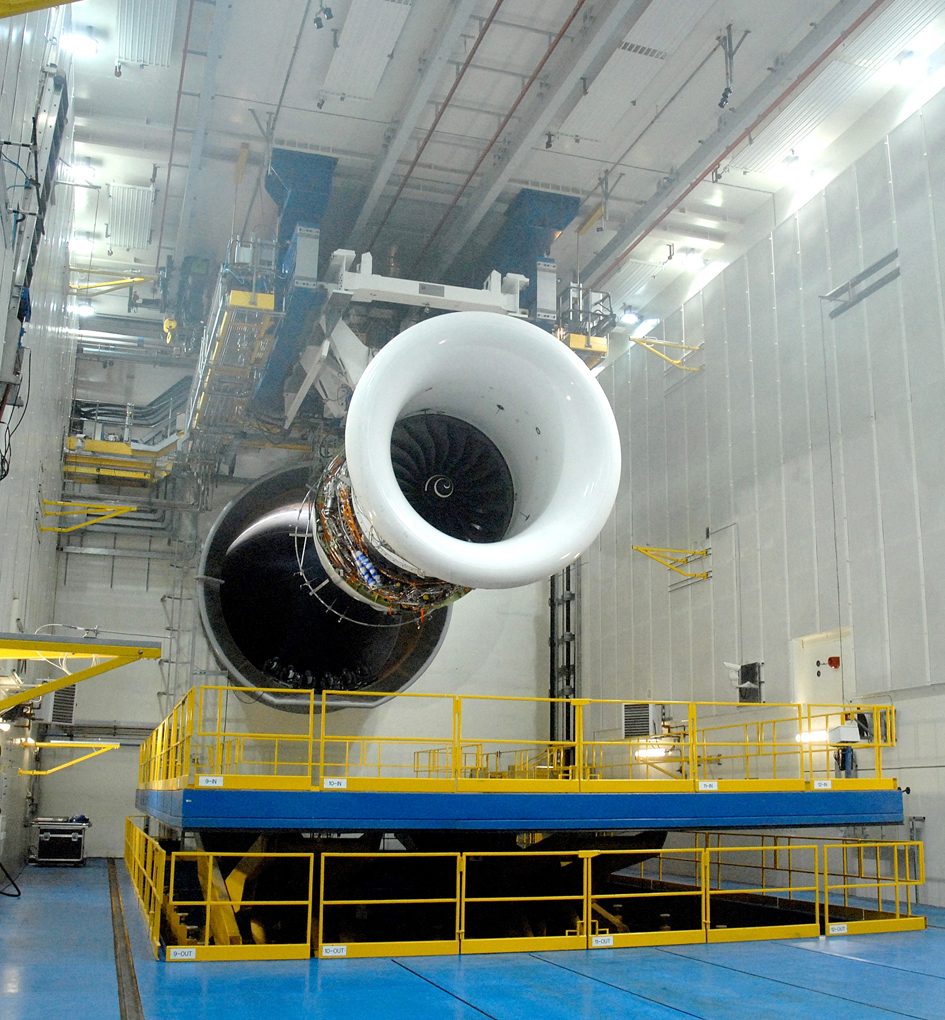
Rolls-Royce Test Facility, Derby

== See also ==
- Hush kit
- QTOL
