= VMFAT-101 =

Marine Fighter Attack Training Squadron 101
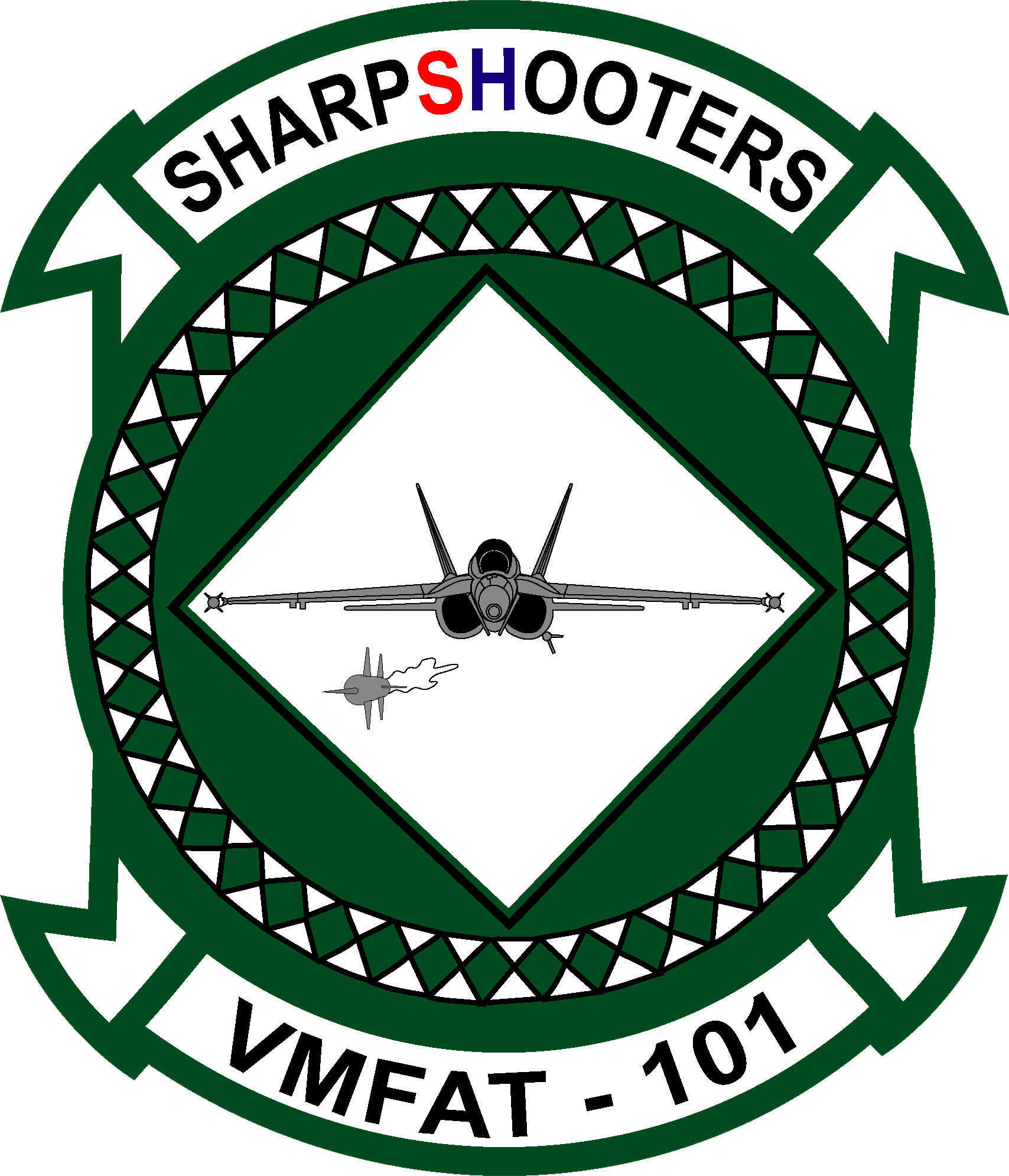
- VMFAT-101 Insignia
- Active: 3 January 1969 – 29 September 2023
- Country: United States
- Branch: USMC
- Type: Fighter/Attack
- Role: Fleet Replacement Squadron
- Part of: Marine Aircraft Group 11; 3rd Marine Aircraft Wing
- Garrison/HQ: N/A
- Nickname: "Sharpshooters"
- Tail Code: SH

Marine Fighter Attack Training Squadron 101 (VMFAT-101) was a United States Marine Corps F/A-18 Hornet training squadron. The squadron was last based at Marine Corps Air Station Miramar, California and fell under the command of Marine Aircraft Group 11 (MAG-11) and the 3rd Marine Aircraft Wing (3rd MAW).

== History ==
Marine Fighter Attack Training Squadron 101 (VMFAT-101), was commissioned at Marine Corps Air Station El Toro, California on 3 January 1969, as part of Marine Combat Crew Readiness Training Group 10, 3rd Marine Aircraft Wing. The squadron trained naval aviators and naval flight officers in the employment of the McDonnell Douglas F-4 Phantom II. VMFAT-101 flew its first training sortie 20 February 1969, and completed its first class of fighter aircrew by August of that year.

During the summer of 1970, VMFAT-101 moved to Marine Corps Air Station Yuma, Arizona. In 1972 the Sharpshooters earned their first Chief of Naval Operations CNO Aviation Safety Award for Excellence in aviation safety after compiling over 18,300 mishap free flight hours.

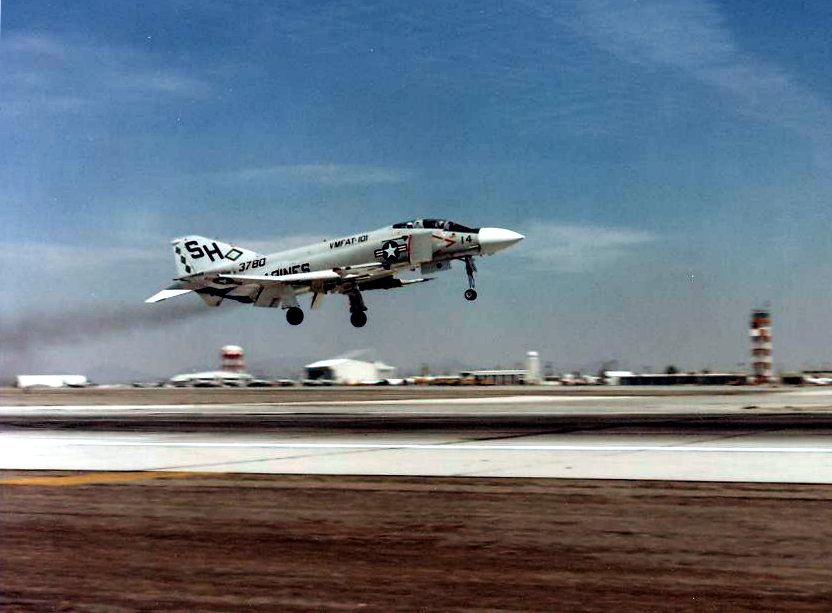
VMFAT-101 F-4J Phantom II at Marine Corps Air Station Yuma in 1977

In July 1974, VMFAT-101 absorbed the assets of VMFAT-201 from Marine Corps Air Station Cherry Point, North Carolina and became the largest fixed wing tactical jet squadron and the sole remaining F-4 training squadron in the Marine Corps. The Sharpshooters earned the 1976 CNO Aviation Safety Award, as well as the Commanding General Fleet Marine Forces Pacific Aviation Safety Award in 1978 and 1979 while it amassed over 30,000 mishap-free flight hours. The Sharpshooters continued to train aircrews in the venerable Phantom II and in 1983 earned the coveted Marine Corps Aviation Association Robert M. Hanson Award as the finest fighter squadron in Marine aviation. 20 May 1987, VMFAT-101 trained its last F-4 replacement aircrew; during July the squadron flew its remaining 10 F-4 aircraft to Davis-Monthan Air Force Base, Ariz., for permanent storage. During the 18 years VMFAT-101 flew the Phantom, the Sharpshooters amassed over 125,000 flight hours training Marine and Navy aircrews for the fleet.

On 29 September 1987, VMFAT-101 returned to MCAS El Toro to beginning training as the Marine Corps’ dedicated F/A-18 Fleet Replacement Squadron (FRS). On 31 March 1988, MCCRTG-10 deactivated and VMFAT-101 joined Marine Aircraft Group 11. By October of that year, the Sharpshooters owned 21 F/A-18s, had trained 25 qualified instructor pilots and were ready to begin training new Hornet pilots. By May 1989 VMFAT-101 graduated 23 new F/A-18 pilots and accumulated over 11,000 mishap free Hornet flight hours.

With three times the number of aircraft of a typical F/A-18 squadron, VMFAT-101 is capable of producing 40 replacement pilots (RPs) in addition to refreshing numerous former fleet aviators that are out of currency. With the replacement of the A-6 Intruder in the Marine Corps with the twin-seat F/A-18D Hornet, VMFAT-101 also returned to training USMC naval flight officers, in this case as F/A-18D weapon systems officers in addition to training USMC naval aviators as pilots in both single-seat and twin-seat variants of the Hornet.

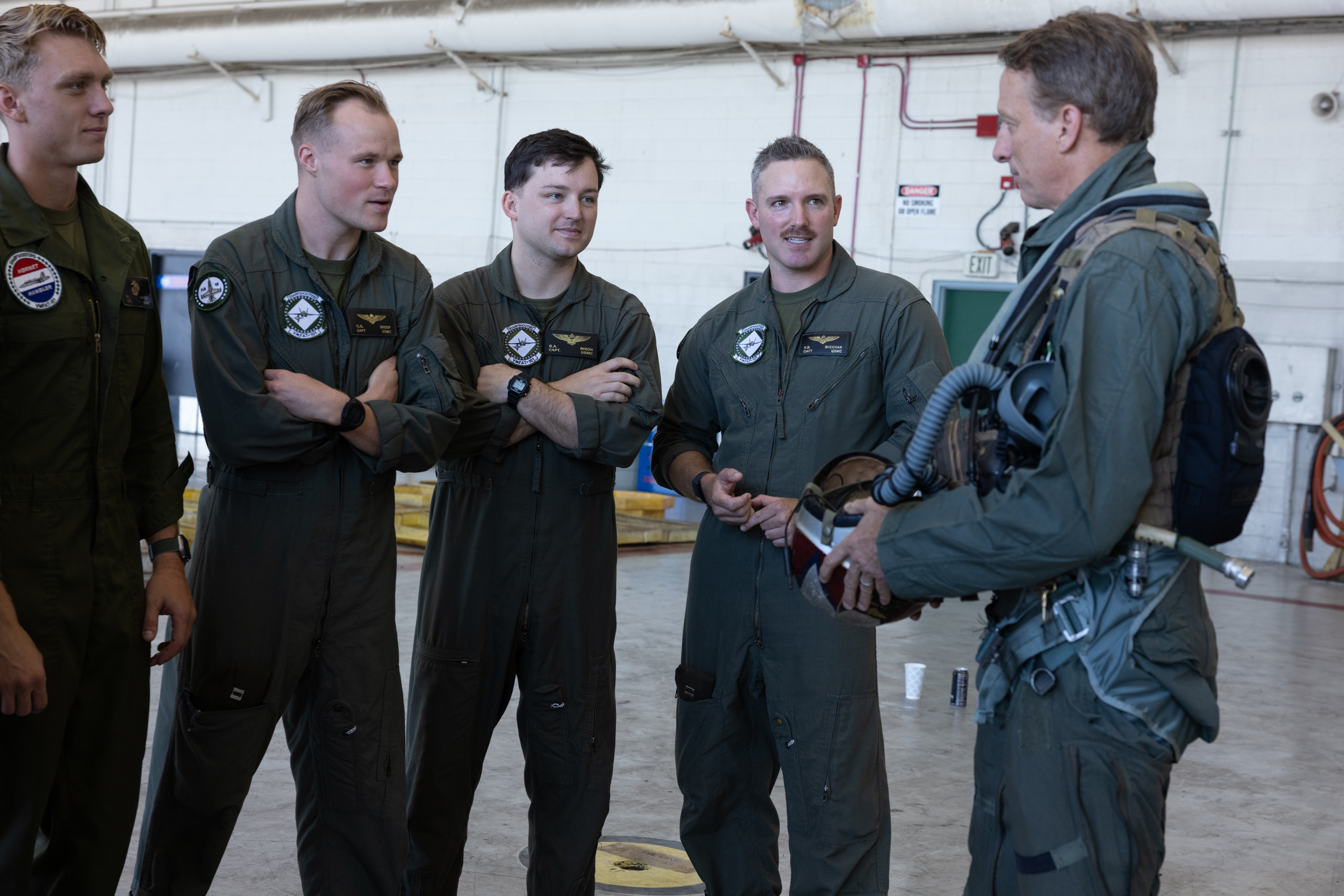
Members of VMFAT-101 at MCAS Miramar in August 2023

VMFAT-101 also trains Marine Corps and Navy maintenance personnel. Given the squadron's aircraft fleet size, numerous personnel obtain technical maintenance qualifications and hold leadership roles during their assignment with the "Sharpshooters."

The focus of flight training while at VMFAT-101 is oriented towards the tactical employment of the F/A-18 in various combat scenarios. Collectively referred to as replacement aircrew (RACs), these aviation officers undergo intense training that normally lasts 44 weeks and is broken into four distinct phases: Transition, Air-to-Ground, Air-to-Air, and Carrier Qualification.

The first training phase is the Transition Phase, which is the shortest phase in duration and covers the most basic aircraft procedures, focusing primarily on Naval Air Training and Operating Procedures Standardization knowledge, aircraft combat systems, navigation, night flying, formation flying, and basic radar intercepts. After a student completes the Transition phase, they are comfortable flying the Hornet and operating all of its systems, as well as able to operate and navigate the F/A-18 in any weather, day or night.

The second phase of training is the Air-to-Ground phase. Once the RACs have demonstrated sound aircraft systems knowledge, navigation, and formation flying, it is time to introduce tactical employment of the Hornet in combat scenarios. During the Strike Phase, the RACs practice basic dive bombing, low-altitude tactics, high-altitude target attacks, Joint Direct Attack Munitions employment, close air support and are introduced to night-vision goggle flight. During this phase, the RACs employ a variety of light and heavy inert ordnance, general-purpose bombs, high-explosive rockets and 20mm gun rounds. Additionally, the replacement WSOs are introduced to forward air controller airborne (FAC(A)) procedures.

After completing the Strike Phase, the RACs move on to the dynamic and demanding Air-to-Air Phase. The aircrew begin the phase by learning how to fight the F/A-18 in the basic fighter maneuvers (BFM), i.e., "dog-fighting." Using Marine Aviation Weapons and Tactics Squadron One (MAWTS-1) training tactics and procedures, fighter weapon instructors teach the RACs how to push the F/A-18 to the limits of its operating envelope.

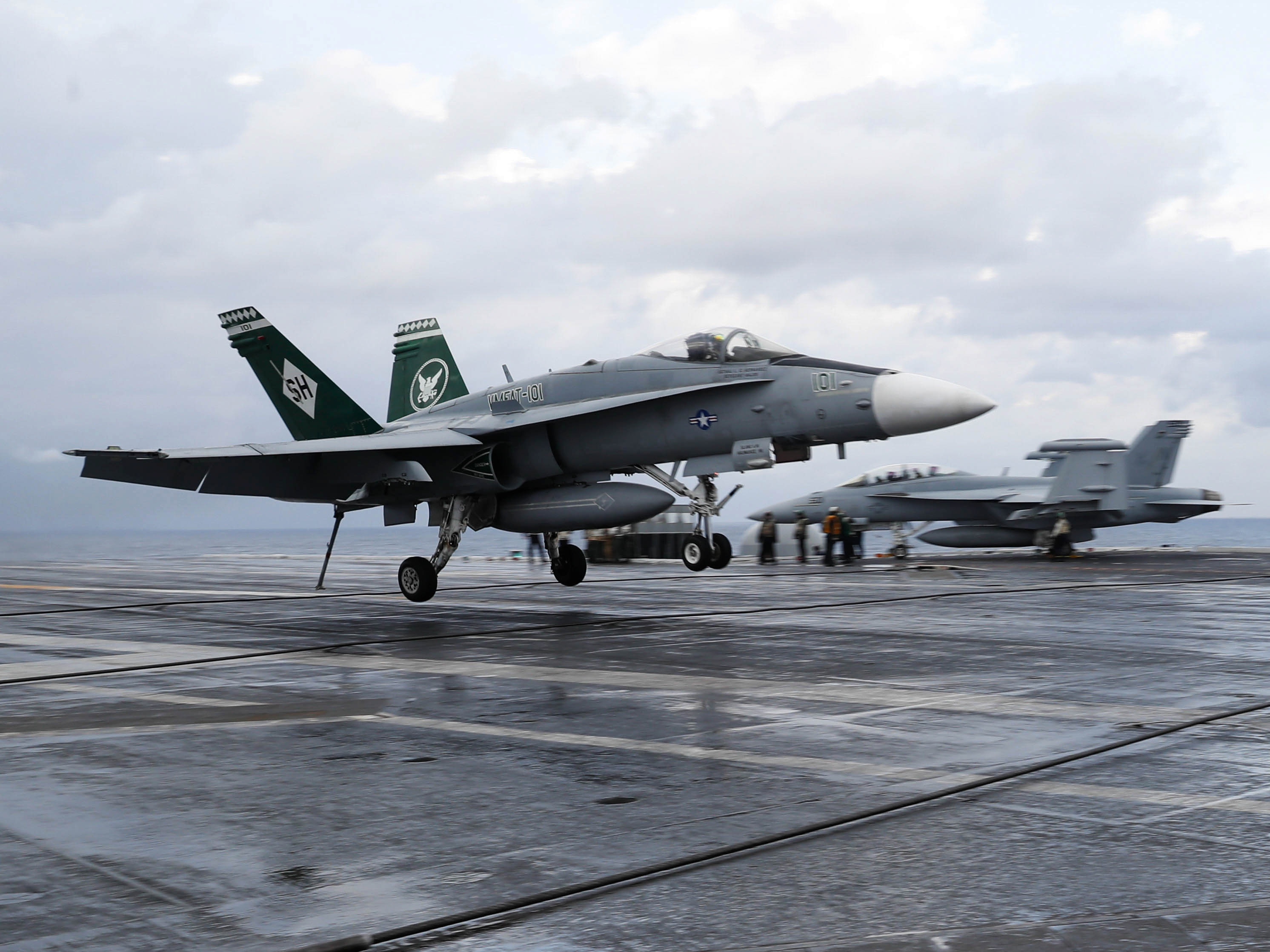
VMFAT-101 F/A-18C Hornet landing on USS Abraham Lincoln (CVN-72) in 2018

The final phase of the FRS syllabus is Carrier Qualification (CQ). The RPs undergo an intense period of field carrier landing practice. Their Instructor Landing Signals Officers (LSOs), will carefully monitor their progress every step of the way, while providing techniques and instruction throughout the entire process.

The customers of the VMFAT-101 product are the eleven deployable fleet squadrons and all four Marine Aircraft Groups. Whether the aircrew will be serving in support of CENTCOM AOR requirements, launching off the carrier into combat within weeks of leaving the unit, or serving as part of the USMC Unit Deployment Program to Iwakuni, Japan, the SharpShooters ensure that every Replacement Aircrew they send off is mission-capable from day one. They will arrive ready to take an active role in combat missions, and eventually move on to assume leadership positions within the squadron in one to two years – potentially responsible for leading flights of 2 or 4 aircraft at a time.

On Friday, 29 September 2023, VMFAT-101 was decommissioned after 54 years of service. It was the last remaining F/A-18 Hornet training squadron in the US Navy and the Marine Corps. In its absence, VMFA-323 assumes the role of training replacement F/A-18 pilots until the aircraft is finally phased out of the Marine Corps inventory.

== See also ==
- United States Marine Corps Aviation
- List of active United States Marine Corps aircraft squadrons
- List of inactive United States Marine Corps aircraft squadrons
