= Run-up (aviation) =

Checks performed on an aircraft prior to take-off

In aviation, run-up, or runup, is the series of last-minute checks performed by pilots on an aircraft prior to take-off. Run-ups are also sometimes performed by aircraft mechanics. This could occur at a gate between flights or elsewhere to test engines and diagnose engine problems.

== Overview ==
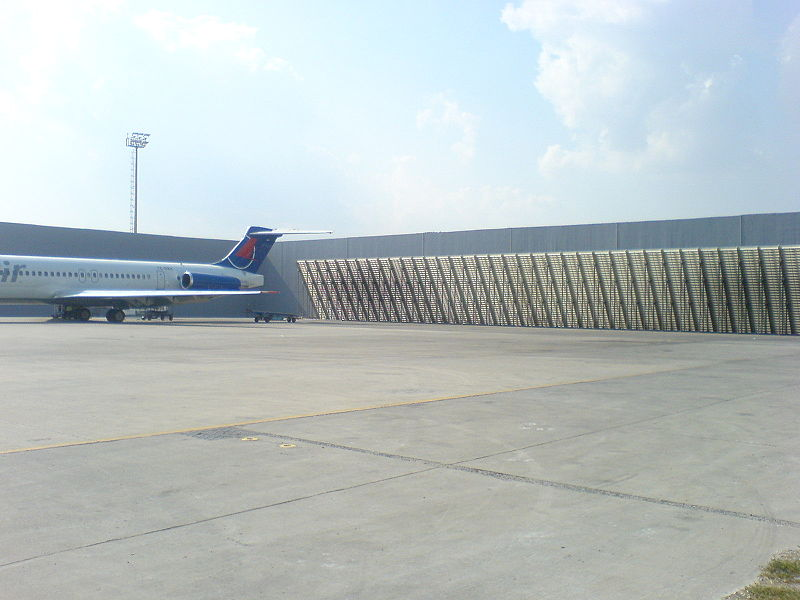
Outdoor engine run up area of the Istanbul Atatürk Airport

The checks performed during a run-up vary with the type of aircraft and (to a lesser extent) with the operating rules under which the flight is being conducted, e.g., instrument flight rules, visual flight rules, operation as a commercial carrier or private pilot, and so on. The term run-up alludes to engine checks that involve temporarily advancing the throttles to ensure that engines are capable of producing take-off thrust, although not all run-up procedures involve such checks.

A run-up area is a location at an airport where pilots can perform run-up checks of their aircraft. They exist because air blast from engine verification may cause problems for other aircraft or structures, so a special area where such checks will do no harm is set aside for them. They also allow aircraft to temporarily leave taxiways so that they don't obstruct ground traffic while the run-up is performed. For these reasons, run-up areas are typically located near runways.

== Ground personnel safety ==
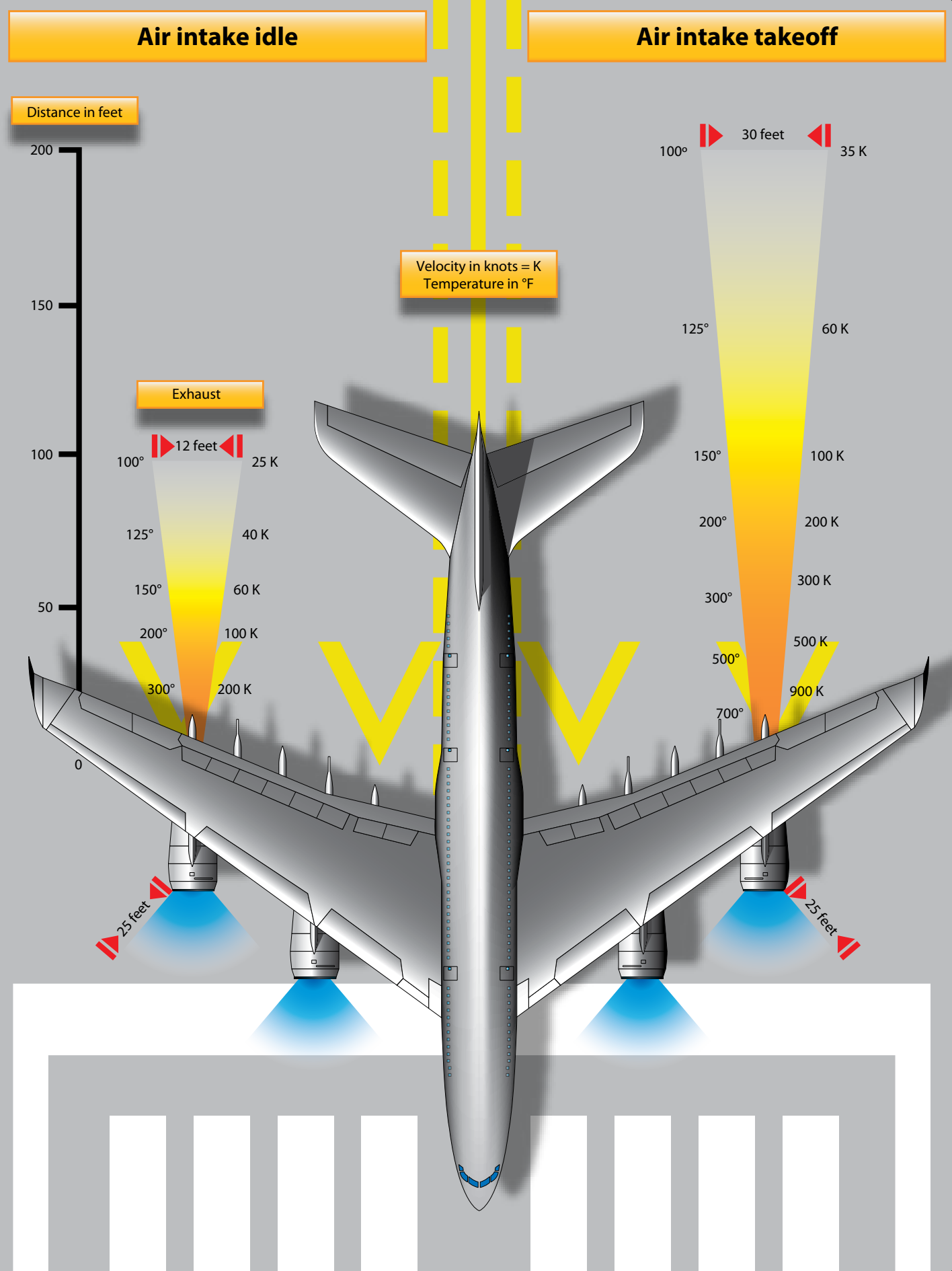
Jet engine intake and exhaust danger zone

For safety reasons, run-ups on large transport-category aircraft require the utmost coordination between the cockpit crew and the ground crew. On January 16, 2006, an experienced mechanic was inspecting the #2 engine of a Boeing 737-500 during a run-up when he accidentally positioned himself too close to the engine's intake. With the engine running near takeoff thrust, he was ingested into the engine and died as a result. In late March 2020, an American Eagle CRJ doing an engine run-up caused a hangar to flip and land on its roof while also damaging two privately owned aircraft at San Luis Obispo airport.
