= McDonnell Douglas Phantom in UK service - data =

Fighter aircraft in UK service

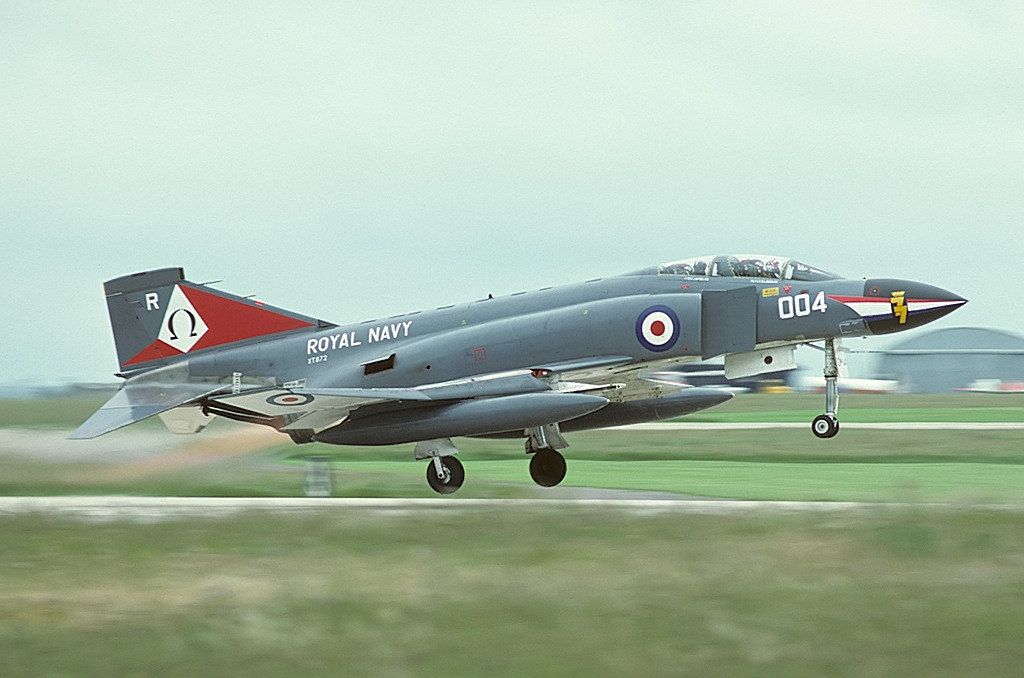
Royal Navy Phantom in 1977

A total of 185 F-4 Phantoms were produced for and operated by the United Kingdom between 1968 and 1992. Between 1966 and 1969, 170 Phantoms were specially built for the UK, replacing the de Havilland Sea Vixen in the fleet air defence role for the Royal Navy, and the Hawker Hunter in the close air support and tactical reconnaissance roles in the Royal Air Force. Subsequently, when replaced by the SEPECAT Jaguar for close air support and reconnaissance, the Phantom replaced the English Electric Lightning as the UK's primary air defence interceptor. The Phantom was operated by the Royal Navy until 1978, when HMS Ark Royal, the only British ship capable of operating the aircraft, was decommissioned. Following this, the Royal Navy's Phantoms were turned over to the Royal Air Force. In 1984, a batch of 15 former United States Navy and United States Marine Corps Phantoms were obtained by the Royal Air Force to form an additional squadron. The Phantom began to be replaced by the air defence variant of the Panavia Tornado from 1987, and was finally withdrawn from service in 1992.

== Basic specifications ==
Comparison of variants
Variant designation		Image	Powerplant	Speed (at 40,000 ft)	Ceiling	Range	Weight		Wingspan	Length	Height	Production total
US	UK	Image	Powerplant	Speed (at 40,000 ft)	Ceiling	Range	Empty	Maximum	Wingspan	Length	Height	Production total
F-4K	FG.1		2 x Rolls-Royce Spey 201/203 low-bypass turbofan	1,386 mph (2,231 km/h)	57,200 ft (17,400 m)	1,750 mi (2,820 km)	31,000 lb (14,000 kg)	58,000 lb (26,000 kg)	38 ft 5 in (11.71 m)	57 ft 7 in (17.55 m)	16 ft 1 in (4.90 m) (Note: 16 ft 9 in (5.11 m) with Radar Warning Receiver)	52 (Note: Including two YF-4K prototypes and two pre-production test articles.)
F-4M	FGR.2		2 x Rolls-Royce Spey 202/204 low-bypass turbofan	1,386 mph (2,231 km/h)	57,200 ft (17,400 m)	1,750 mi (2,820 km)	31,000 lb (14,000 kg)	58,000 lb (26,000 kg)	38 ft 5 in (11.71 m)	57 ft 7 in (17.55 m)	16 ft 1 in (4.90 m)	118 (Note: Including two YF-4M prototypes.)
F-4J(UK)	F.3		2 x General Electric J79-10B axial flow turbojet	1,428 mph (2,298 km/h)	64,700 ft (19,700 m)	1,750 mi (2,820 km)	29,900 lb (13,600 kg)	58,000 lb (26,000 kg)	38 ft 5 in (11.71 m)	58 ft 3 in (17.75 m)	15 ft 8 in (4.78 m)	15

== UK Phantom orders ==
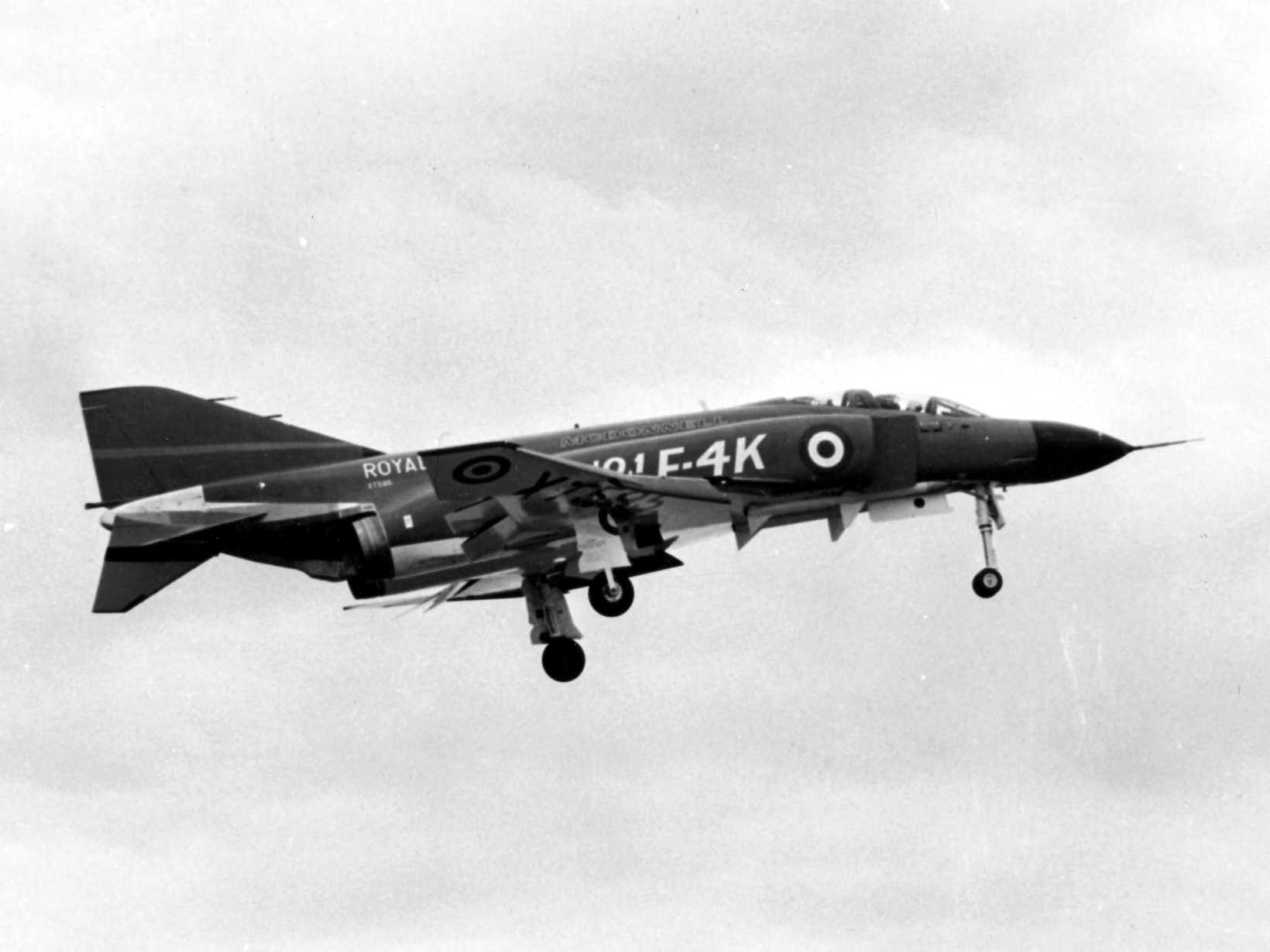
The first YF-4K prototype in flight in October 1966 – this was one of the first batch of four Phantoms that was ordered by the UK in September 1964.

The UK's Phantoms were ordered in a total of four batches. The bulk were ordered between 1964 and 1966, and encompassed the F-4Ks and F-4Ms ordered specially for the Fleet Air Arm and RAF, including four prototypes and two pre-production models, plus a total of 53 airframes that were ultimately cancelled. The final batch was the 15 F-4J(UK) aircraft obtained in 1983.

Variant	Order date				Subsequently cancelled
Variant	Sep 1964	Jul 1965	Oct 1966	Sep 1983	Subsequently cancelled
YF-4K	2	—	—	—	—
YF-4K	XT595-XT596	—	—	—	—
YF-4M	—	2	—	—	—
YF-4M	—	XT852-XT853	—	—	—
F-4K	2	20	35	—	7
F-4K	XT597-XT598	XT857-XT876; XV565-XV571	XV572-XV592; XV604-XV610	—	XV604-XV610
F-4M	—	38	124	—	46
F-4M	—	XT891-XT928	XV393-XV442; XV460-XV501; XV520-XV551	—	XT915-XT928; XV520-XV551
F-4J(UK)	—	—	—	15	—
F-4J(UK)	—	—	—	ZE350-ZE364	—

Within the range of military serial registrations assigned to the Phantom, there are a number of serial numbers missing, primarily within the XV range. None of these serial numbers were assigned to any UK military aircraft.

- XV593-XV603 – the F-4K range of XV serials runs from XV572-XV592 (the second batch of production models) and then XV604-XV610 (the cancelled batch of seven airframes).
- XV443-XV459 and XV502-XV519 – the F-4M range of XV serials includes two gaps in the second production order.

== Timeline of Phantom operations ==
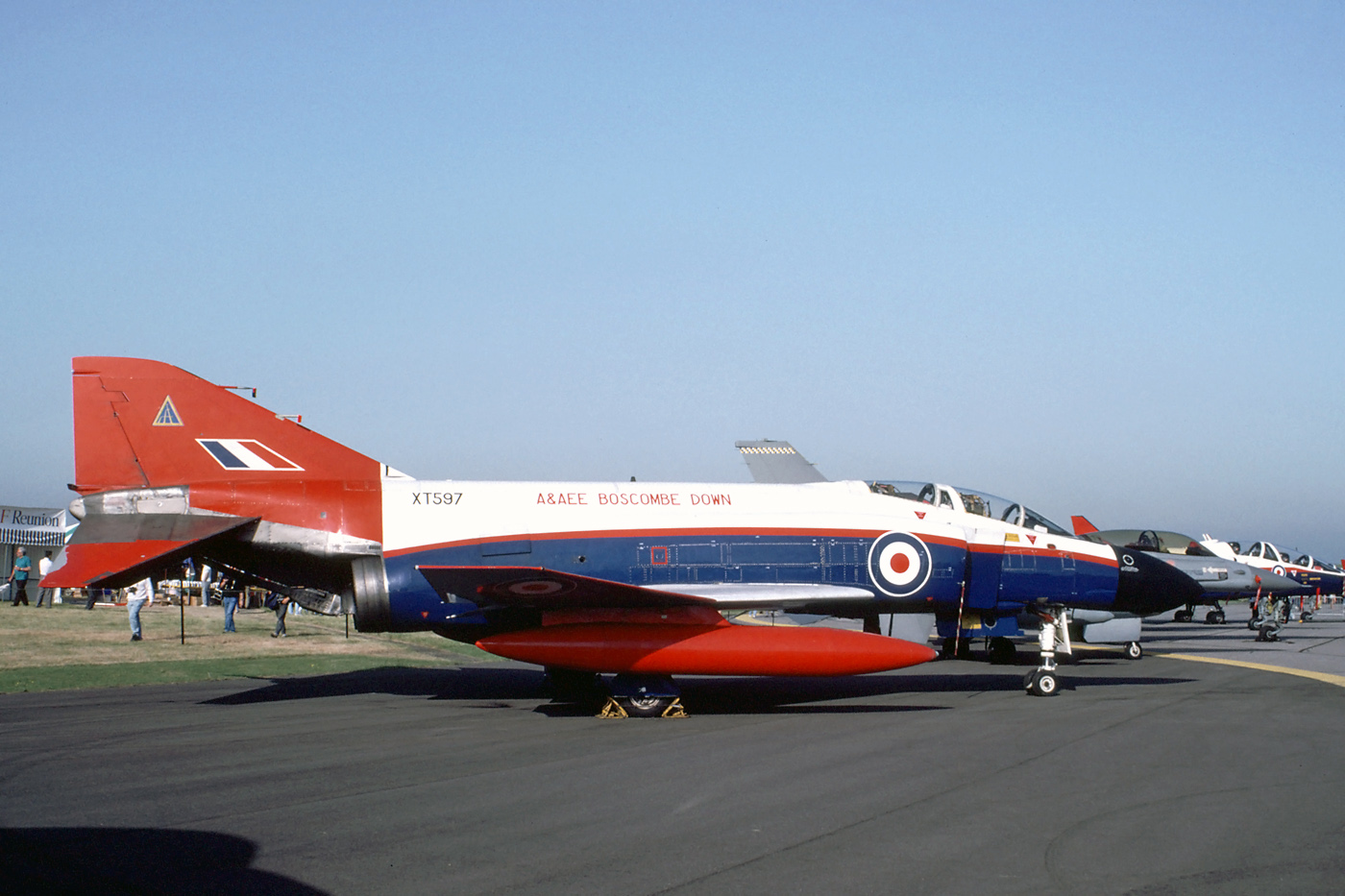
Phantom FG.1 of the A&AEE in 1992. This individual Phantom (XT597) was the final Spey-powered example to fly when it was retired by the A&AEE in January 1994

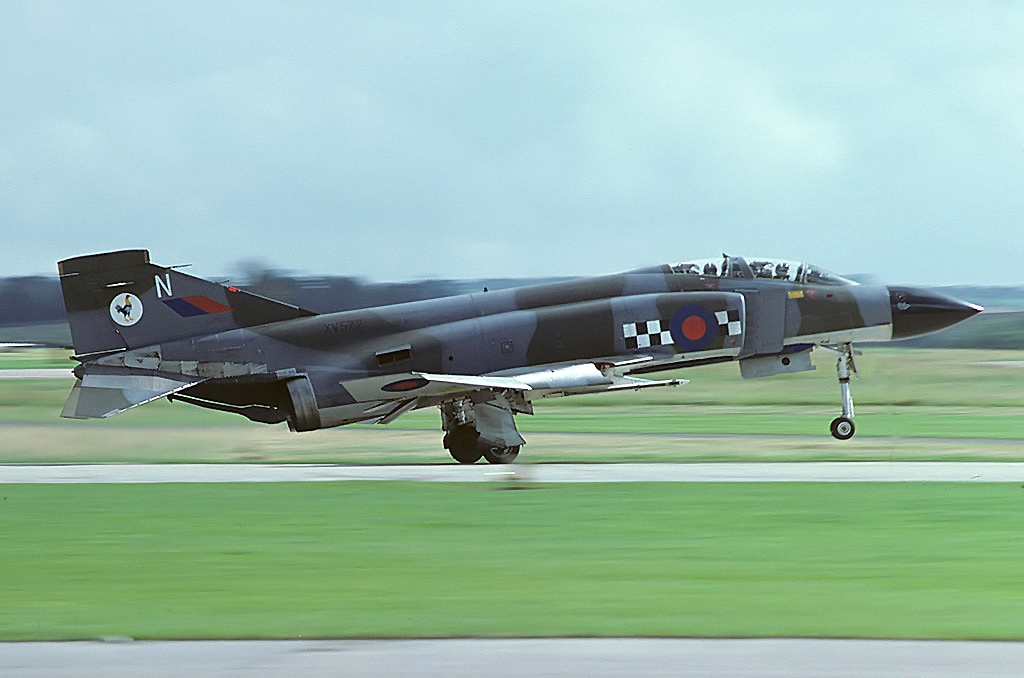
Phantom FG.1 of No. 43 Squadron in 1978. No. 43 Squadron operated the Phantom operationally from 1 September 1969 to 31 July 1989, longer than any other front-line UK Phantom squadron.

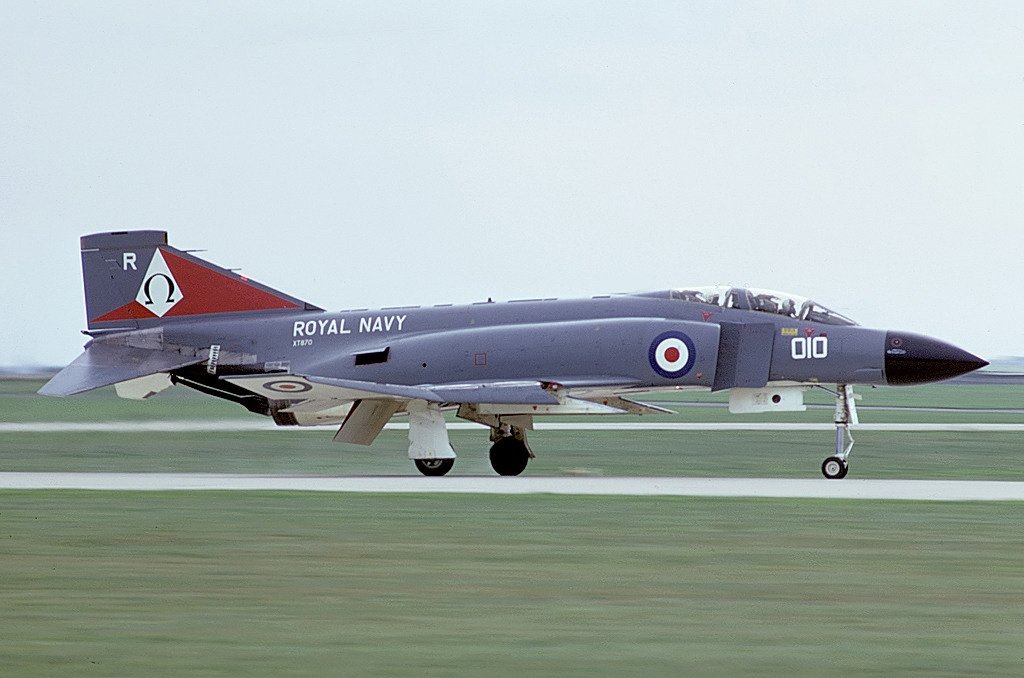
Phantom FG.1 of 892 Naval Air Squadron in 1975. 892 NAS operated from March 1969 to December 1978 as the only front-line Phantom unit to fly from a British aircraft carrier.

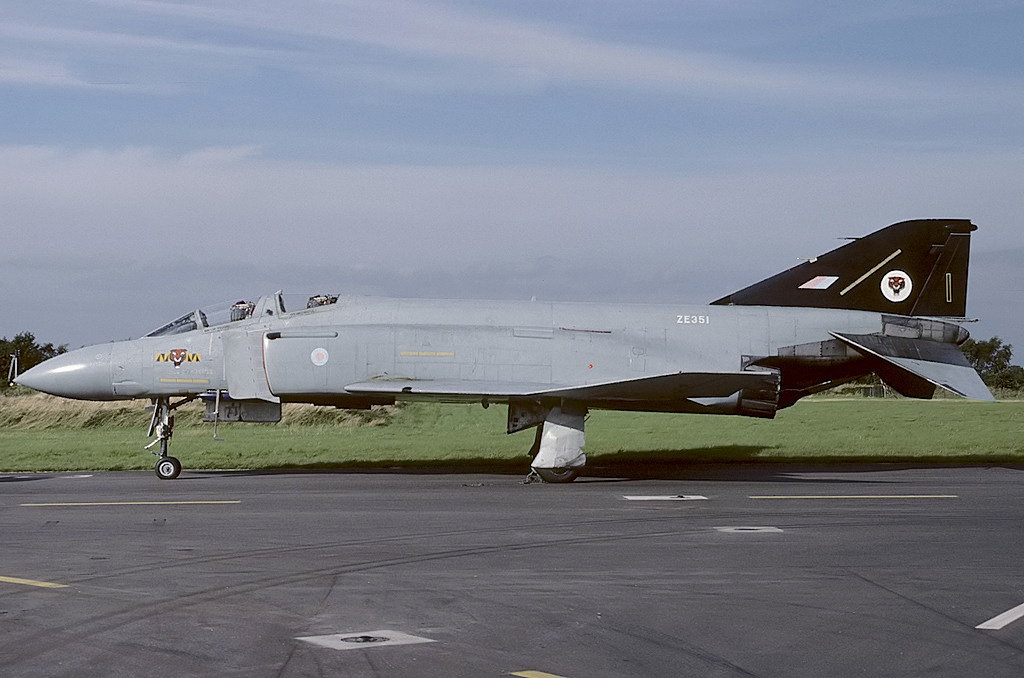
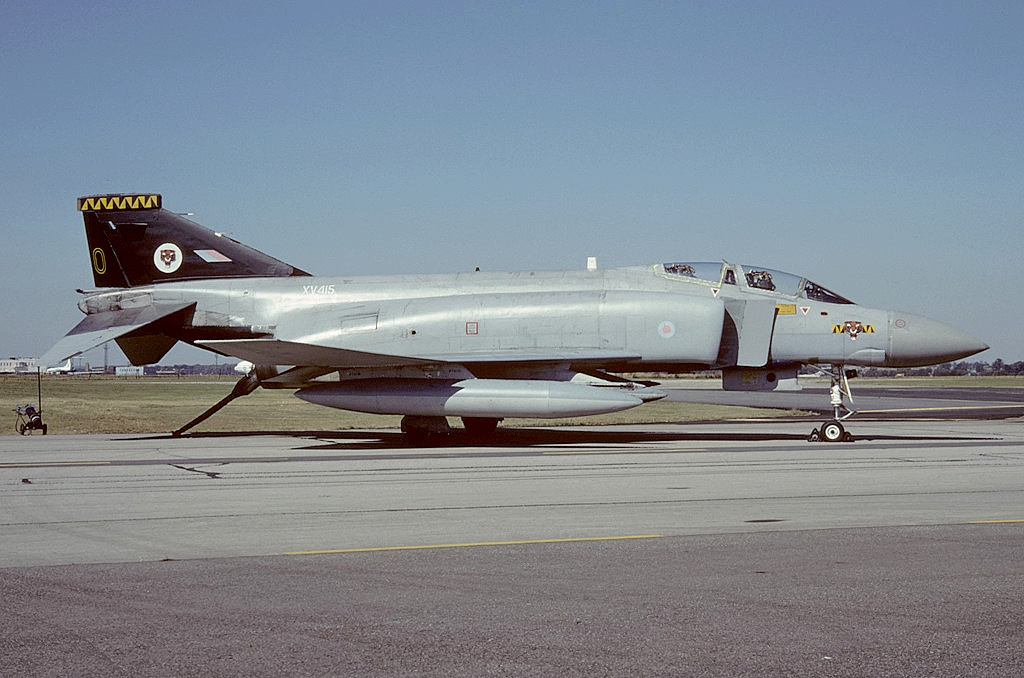
Phantom F.3 (left) and FGR.2 (right), both of No. 74 Squadron. No. 74 Squadron was declared operational on the F.3 on 31 December 1984, and retained the type until 31 January 1991, when it converted to the FGR.2. It was finally disbanded as the last UK Phantom squadron on 1 October 1992.

The Phantom was operated by the Fleet Air Arm and RAF for 25 years between 1968 and 1992; 700P NAS operated the Phantom for just twelve months during its operational evaluation period, while No. 64 (R) Squadron, the RAF's Operational Conversion Unit, utilised the type from August 1968 to January 1991. The A&AEE had a single Phantom permanently on strength from 1970; this was finally withdrawn in January 1994, becoming the last Spey-powered Phantom to fly.

Unit
Unit	1960s		1970s										1980s										1990s				
Unit	68	69	70	71	72	73	74	75	76	77	78	79	80	81	82	83	84	85	86	87	88	89	90	91	92	93	94
A&AEE																											
700P Naval Air Squadron																											
767 Naval Air Squadron																											
892 Naval Air Squadron																											
No. 2 Squadron																											
No. 6 Squadron																											
No. 14 Squadron																											
No. 17 Squadron																											
No. 19 Squadron																											
No. 23 Squadron																											
No. 29 Squadron																											
No. 31 Squadron																											
No. 41 Squadron																											
No. 43 Squadron																											
No. 54 Squadron																											
No. 56 Squadron																											
No. 64 (R) Squadron (Note: No. 228 OCU was originally formed in August 1968, and was assigned the shadow squadron identity of No. 64 Squadron in July 1970.)																											
No. 74 Squadron (Note: No. 74 Squadron converted from the F.3 to the FGR.2 in 1991 prior to disbanding)																											
No. 92 Squadron																											
No. 111 Squadron (Note: No. 111 Squadron converted from the FGR.2 to the FG.1 in 1979)																											
No. 1435 Flight																											
Phantom Training Flight																											

== External weapons and other stores ==
The Phantom had a total of nine weapons stations, with two under each wing, one under the fuselage, and four along the side of the fuselage (see diagram), with the aircraft ultimately rated to carry up to 16,000 lb (7,300 kg) of external stores. UK Phantoms could be fitted with a range of both air-to-air, air-to-ground and reconnaissance stores in varying quantities through the use of different adapters fitted to its weapon stations:

- Stations 1, 5 and 9 were plumbed to allow the carriage of external fuel tanks
- Stations 2 and 8 were each capable of being fitted with a pair of LAU-7/A missile rails for the carriage of AIM-9 Sidewinder missiles
- Stations 1, 2, 5, 8 and 9 could each be fitted with a Carrier Bomb Triple Ejector (CBTE) to allow the carriage of up to three weapons per station
- Stations 3, 4, 6 and 7 were semi-recessed ejector stations for the carriage of AIM-7 Sparrow or GEC Skyflash missiles

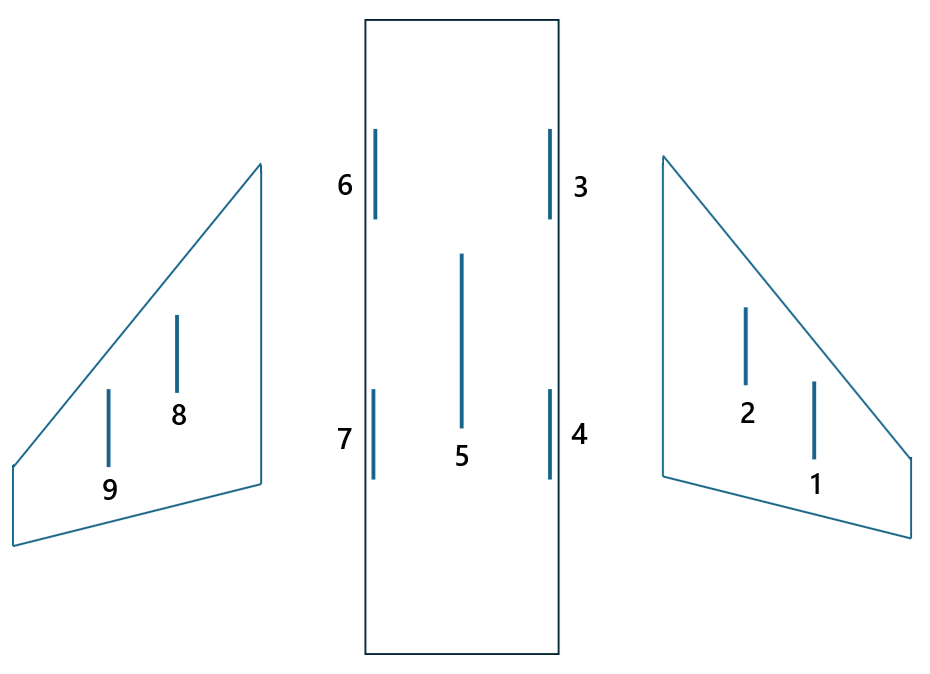
Diagrammatic representation of Phantom weapon stations

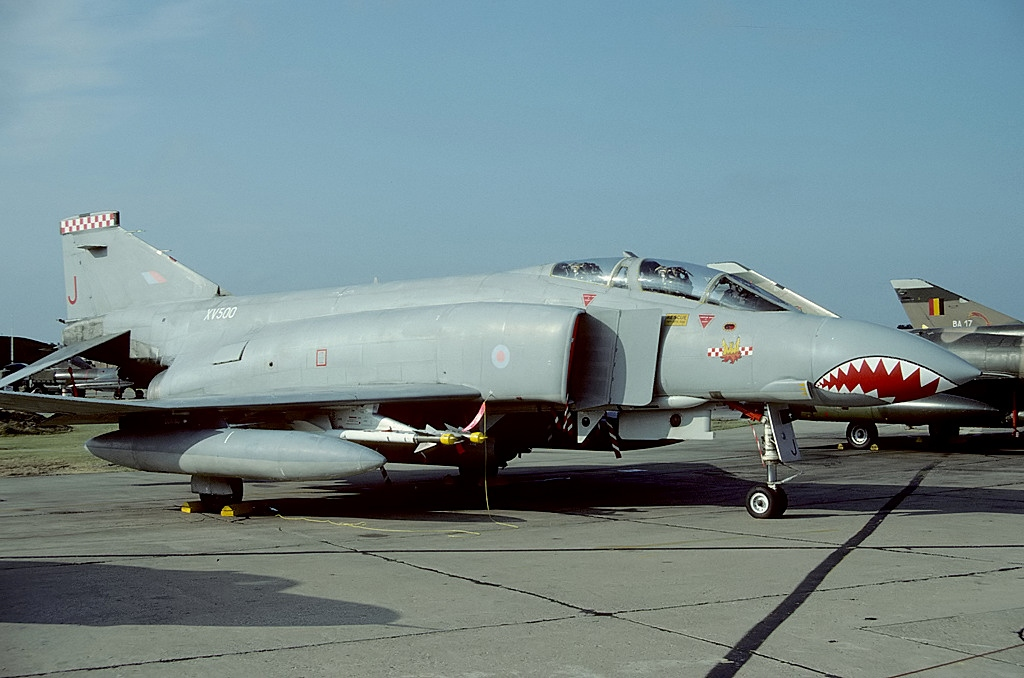
Phantom FGR.2 with a fuel tank on station 9; LAU-7/A rails with missiles on station 8; a missile on station 6; and a gun pod on station 5

Name	Type	Notes	Weapons stations								
Name	Type	Notes	9	8	7	6	5	4	3	2	1
Gun
SUU-23/A (Note: Royal Air Force aircraft only)	Gun pod	Utilised in air-to-air and air-to-ground roles					✓				
Air-to-Air weapons
AIM-7E Sparrow	SARH air-to-air missile			✓	✓	✓		✓	✓	✓	
Skyflash	SARH air-to-air missile	Development of Sparrow with inverse monopulse seeker		✓	✓	✓		✓	✓	✓	
AIM-9 Sidewinder	IR air-to-air missile	Initially fitted with AIM-9G before upgrading to AIM-9L		✓						✓	
Air-to-Ground weapons
MC Mk13 1000lb bomb	General-purpose bomb		✓	✓			✓			✓	✓
M2 540lb bomb	General-purpose bomb		✓	✓			✓			✓	✓
BL755	Cluster bomb		✓	✓			✓			✓	✓
Matra Type 116 rocket pod	Rocket pod	For carriage of SNEB 68mm rocket projectile	✓	✓			✓			✓	✓
Microcell No.7 rocket pod (Note: Fleet Air Arm aircraft only)	Rocket pod	For carriage of RP2 2-inch rocket projectile	✓	✓			✓			✓	✓
Special weapons
B43 variable yield thermonuclear bomb (Note: RAF Phantoms stationed in Germany were assigned to the nuclear strike role between 1968 and 1974, when they began to be transferred to the air defence mission. The Fleet Air Arm instead employed the Buccaneer in the nuclear strike role using the UK developed WE.177 weapon.)	Tactical nuclear weapon	Variable yield of 70 kilotons to 1 megaton					✓				
B57 variable yield nuclear bomb	Tactical nuclear weapon	Variable yield of 5 kilotons to 20 kilotons					✓				
Reconnaissance
EMI pod	Reconnaissance pod	Contained side-looking radar, infrared linescan and multiple cameras					✓				
LS-93 Night Flash	Reconnaissance pod	Contained camera with night flash capability; installed in 370 gallon fuel tank	✓								✓
KB-18A Strike camera	Reconnaissance pod								✓		
Fuel tanks
600 gallon external tank	Fuel tank						✓				
Sargent Fletcher 370 gallon external tank	Fuel tank		✓								✓
			9	8	7	6	5	4	3	2	1

== Comparison of Phantom FG.1 with Sea Vixen and Lightning ==
Comparison of Sea Vixen FAW.2, Lightning F.6 and Phantom FG.1
Aircraft	Powerplant	Thrust (each engine)	Speed (at 40,000 ft)	Ceiling	Range		Armament (air defence)	Avionics
Aircraft	Powerplant	Thrust (each engine)	Speed (at 40,000 ft)	Ceiling	Combat	Maximum	Armament (air defence)	Avionics
Sea Vixen	2 x Rolls-Royce Avon Mk.208 turbojets	11,000 lbf (49 kN)	700 mph (1,100 km/h)	48,000 ft (15,000 m)	600 mi (970 km)	2,000 mi (3,200 km)	4 x Firestreak or Red Top air to air missile (AAM)	GEC AI.18 X-band radar
Lightning	2 x Rolls-Royce Avon Mk.301 turbojets	12,690 lbf (56.4 kN) dry thrust 16,360 lbf (72.8 kN) with afterburner	1,500 mph (2,400 km/h)	60,000 ft (18,000 m)	800 mi (1,300 km)	1,250 mi (2,010 km)	2 x Firestreak or Red Top AAM; 2 x 30mm ADEN cannon	Ferranti AI.23 X-band monopulse radar
Phantom	2 x Rolls-Royce Spey Mk.203 turbofans	12,140 lbf (54.0 kN); 20,515 lbf (91.26 kN) with afterburner	1,386 mph (2,231 km/h)	57,200 ft (17,400 m)	1,000 mi (1,600 km)	1,750 mi (2,820 km)	4 x AIM-7 Sparrow or Skyflash AAM; 4 x AIM-9 Sidewinder AAM (Note: Phantoms serving in the RAF were also capable of carrying the SUU-23/A gun pod, which featured a 20mm M61 rotary cannon)	Ferranti AN/AWG-11 X-band multi-mode fire control system

== F-4J airframes selected for conversion to F-4J(UK) ==
In 1982, the UK government took the decision to procure an additional squadron of Phantoms, going on to select a number of used F-4J airframes stored at the Aerospace Maintenance and Regeneration Center in Arizona. A total of 15 airframes were purchased although, over the course of the procurement process, 19 were selected, with four ultimately not being used for various reasons; three of these were subsequently upgraded to F-4S standard for continued service in the US Navy, while the fourth was lost at sea during a ferry flight as an underslung helicopter load. Of the fifteen airframes ultimately selected for the RAF, seven had previously seen active service in Vietnam.

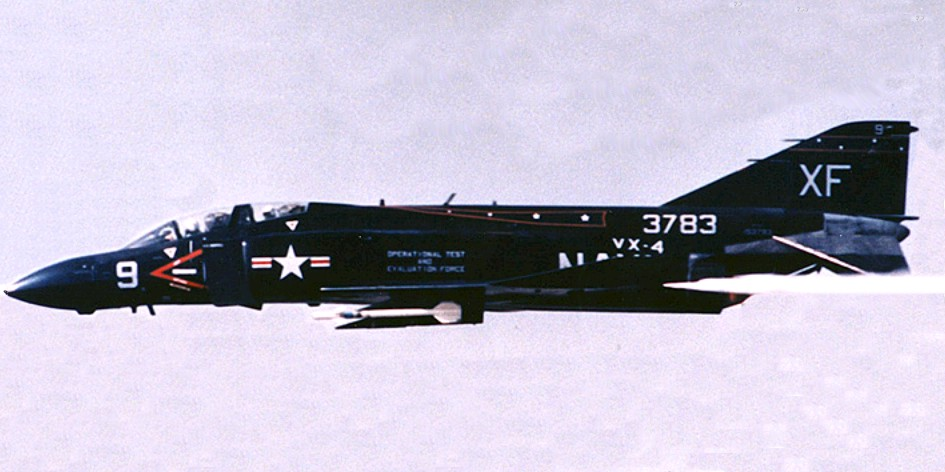
BuNo 153783 of VX-4 in its original incarnation in 1969

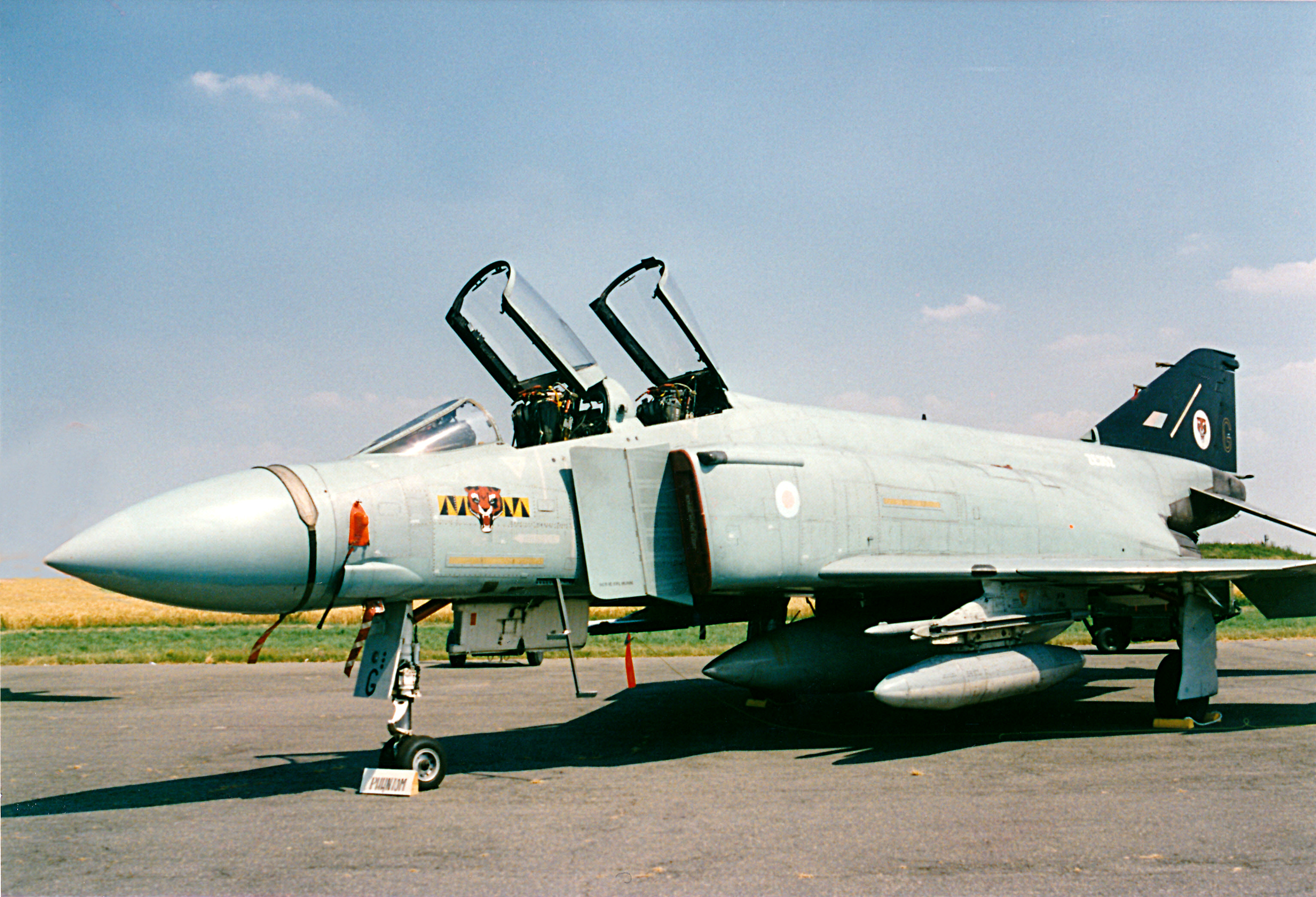
Ex-153783 in its second incarnation as ZE352 of No. 74 Squadron in 1987

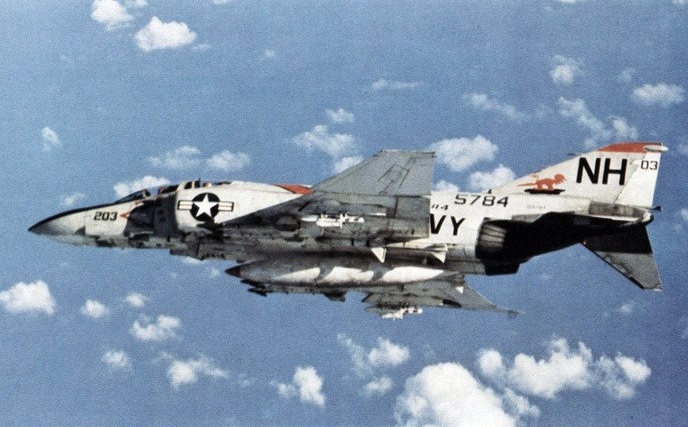
BuNo 155784 of VF-114 in 1972; this was one of the originally selected airframes that was subsequently rejected

BuNo Number	United States service			Fate	RAF serial
BuNo Number	USN	USMC	Vietnam combat?	Fate	RAF serial
153768	VF-101; NATC	—		To RAF as F-4J(UK)	ZE350
153773	VF-171; VF-84; VF-31; VF-74	VMFA-122		To RAF as F-4J(UK)	ZE351
153783	VF-121; VX-4	VMFA-333		To RAF as F-4J(UK)	ZE352
153785	VF-121	VMFA-334; VMFA-232; VMFAT-101	✓	To RAF as F-4J(UK)	ZE353
153795	VX-4; VF-121; VF-213; NATC	—	✓	To RAF as F-4J(UK)	ZE354
153803	VF-121	—	✓	To RAF as F-4J(UK)	ZE355
153824	VF-101; VF-21	—		Upgraded to F-4S (Note: Originally selected, but subsequently rejected by the UK and retained for further service with the US Navy and US Marine Corps.)	—
153850	VF-31; VF-101; VF-33; VF-102; VF-103	VMFAT-101	✓	To RAF as F-4J(UK)	ZE356
153892	VF-101; NATC	—		To RAF as F-4J(UK)	ZE357
155510	VF-102; VF-103	—		To RAF as F-4J(UK)	ZE358
155529	VF-33; VF-31; VF-171	VMFA-112	✓	To RAF as F-4J(UK)	ZE359
155574	VF-31; VF-41; VF-103	—		To RAF as F-4J(UK)	ZE360
155734	VF-92	VMFA-235		To RAF as F-4J(UK)	ZE361
155755	VF-154; VF-121; VF-92	—	✓	To RAF as F-4J(UK)	ZE362
155784	VF-92; VF-114; VF-121	VMFA-232	✓	Upgraded to F-4S	—
155841	VF-103; VF-31	VMFAT-101		Lost during transport (Note: Dropped from helicopter during transport for conversion to F-4J(UK).)	—
155849	VF-121	—		Upgraded to F-4S	—
155868	VF-84; VF-171	VMFA-312		To RAF as F-4J(UK)	ZE363
155894	VF-142	VMFA-212; VMFAT-101	✓	To RAF as F-4J(UK)	ZE364

== List of surviving complete aircraft and aircraft sections ==
While the majority of UK Phantoms were ultimately scrapped, a number of complete examples survived after the type's final withdrawal in 1992, either preserved in museums, or for further use as static articles by other units. Additionally, a number of examples that were ultimately scrapped had sections preserved for display in museums. These surviving complete examples and preserved sections are listed. (Note: Other Phantoms are also on display in the UK – a former United States Air Force F-4C version (63-7699) is preserved at the Midland Air Museum in Coventry; the museum has a second F-4C (63-7414) that was used as a spares source for the display example. A third F-4C, painted to represent 65-0777, is mounted on display at the "Wings of Liberty Airpark" at RAF Lakenheath. An ex-United States Marine Corps F-4S (BuNo 155848) at the National Museum of Flight in East Fortune.)

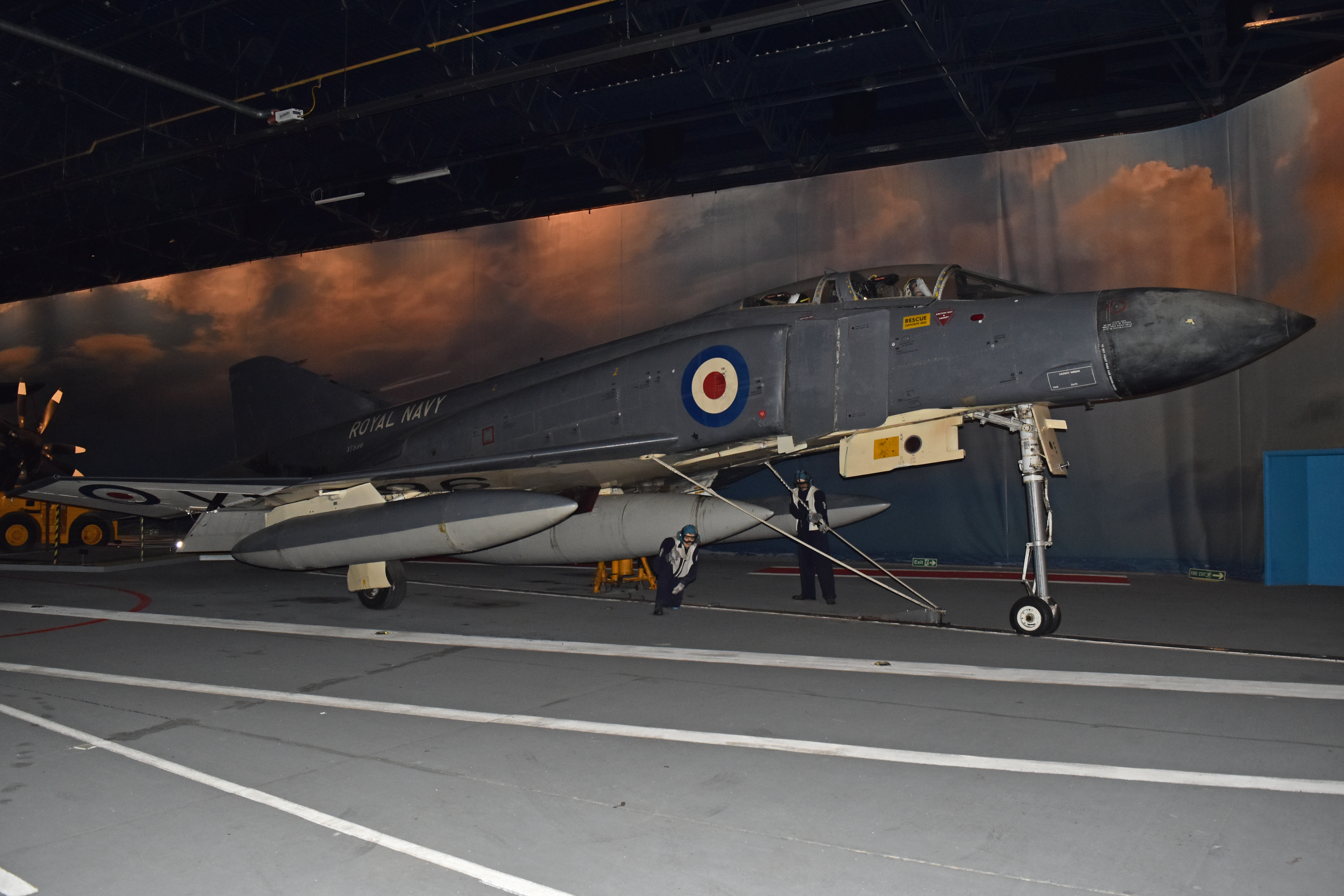
YF-4K Phantom XT596 at the Fleet Air Arm Museum, Yeovilton.

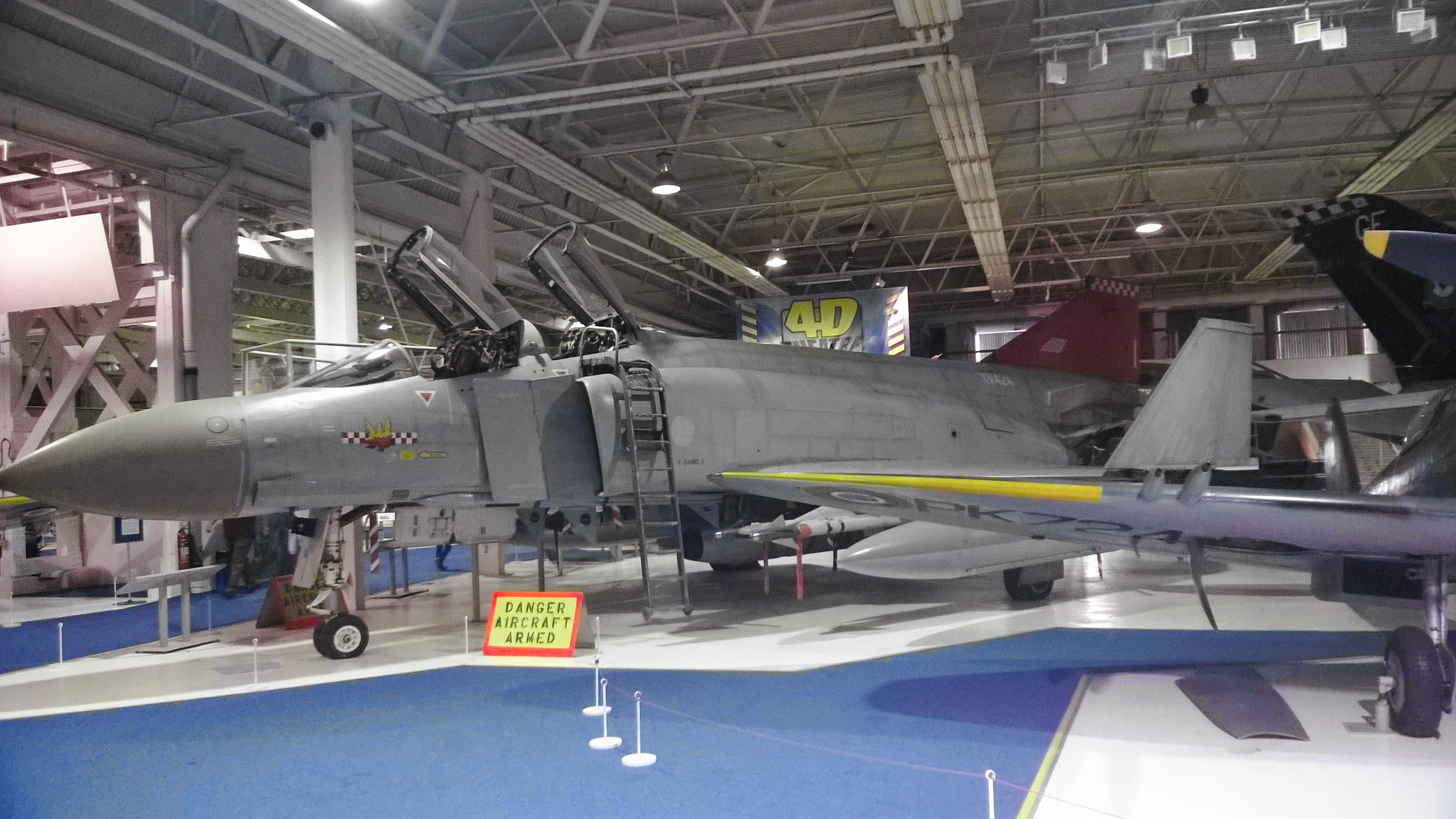
F-4M Phantom XV424 at the RAF Museum, Hendon.

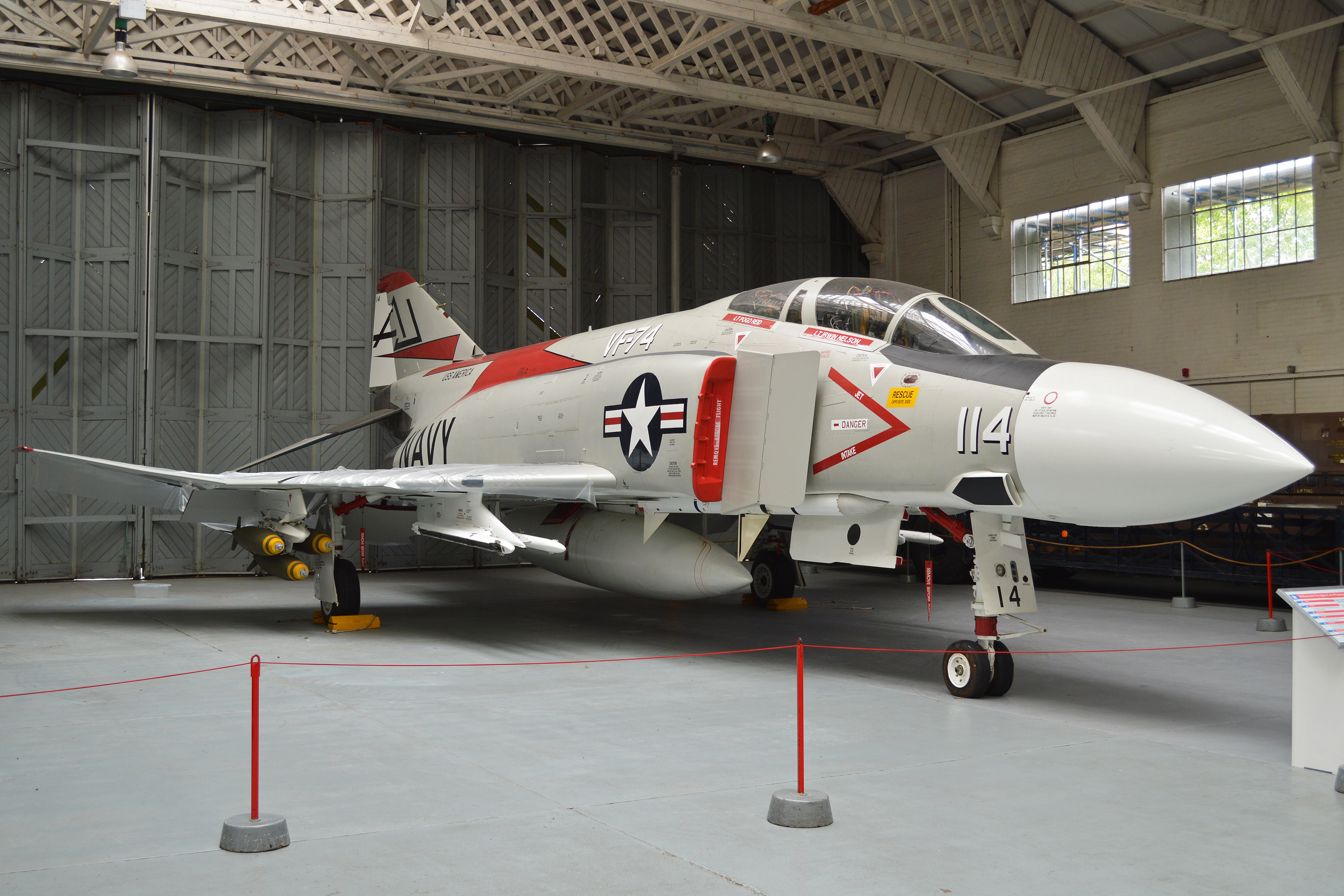
F-4J(UK) Phantom ZE359 in its original identity as BuNo 155529 of VF-74 at the Imperial War Museum Duxford.

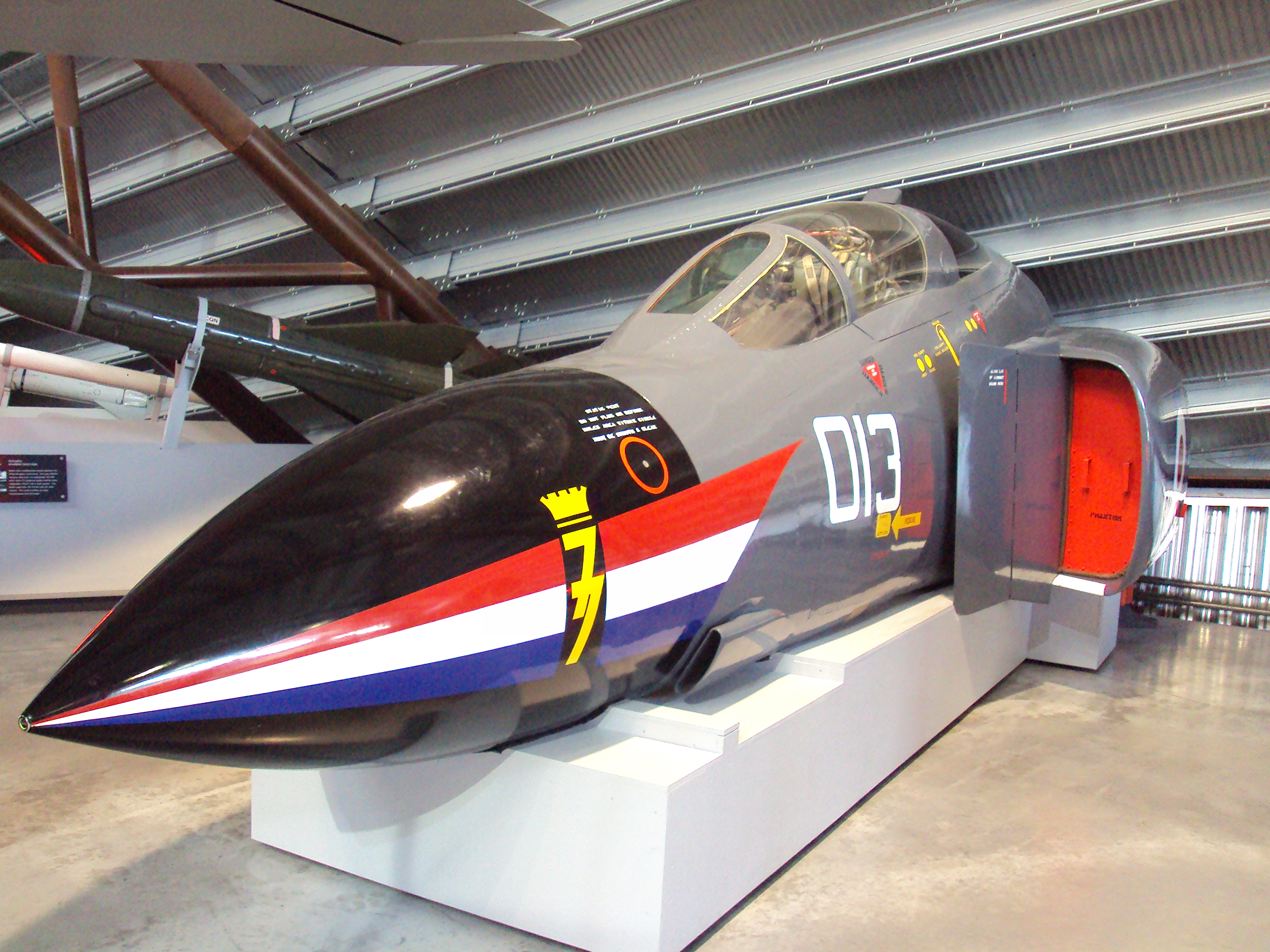
Nose section of F-4K Phantom XV591 at the Royal Air Force Museum Midlands

Aircraft serial	Variant	First UK operator	Final UK operator	Fate	Notes
XT596	YF-4K	Rolls-Royce	British Aerospace	Preserved (Yeovilton)	Oldest preserved UK Phantom
XT597	F-4K	Ministry of Defence (Procurement Executive)	Aeroplane and Armament; Experimental Establishment	Preserved (Kemble)	Final UK Phantom to fly Under restoration by BPAG
XT863	F-4K	700P Naval Air Squadron	No. 43 Squadron	Scrapped	Nose section stored (Cowes)
XT864	F-4K	700P Naval Air Squadron	No. 111 Squadron	Preserved (Lisburn)	
XT891	F-4M	No. 228 OCU	No. 74 Squadron	Preserved (Coningsby)	Gate guardian
XT895	F-4M	No. 228 OCU	No. 74 Squadron	Scrapped	Nose section preserved
XT899	F-4M	No. 228 OCU	No. 19 Squadron	Preserved (Kbely)	
XT903	F-4M	No. 228 OCU	No. 56 Squadron	Scrapped	Nose section preserved (Cosford)
XT905	F-4M	No. 54 Squadron	No. 74 Squadron	Preserved (Kemble)	Under restoration by BPAG
XT914	F-4M	No. 228 OCU	No. 74 Squadron	Preserved (Wattisham)	
XV399	F-4M	No. 228 OCU	No. 56 Squadron	Scrapped	Nose section preserved (Vik)
XV401	F-4M	No. 228 OCU	No. 74 Squadron	Preserved (Bentwaters)	
XV402	F-4M	No. 31 Squadron	No. 56 Squadron	Scrapped	Nose section preserved
XV406	F-4M	Ministry of Defence	No. 228 OCU	Preserved (Carlisle)	
XV408	F-4M	No. 6 Squadron	No. 92 Squadron	Preserved (Tangmere)	
XV409	F-4M	No. 228 OCU	No. 1435 Flight	Scrapped	Nose section preserved (Stanley)
XV415	F-4M	No. 54 Squadron	No. 56 Squadron	Preserved (Boulmer)	Gate guardian
XV419	F-4M	No. 54 Squadron	No. 19 Squadron	Scrapped	Nose section preserved (Ruthin)
XV424	F-4M	No. 6 Squadron	No. 56 Squadron	Preserved (Hendon)	
XV426	F-4M	No. 31 Squadron	No. 56 Squadron	Scrapped	Nose section preserved (Norwich)
XV460	F-4M	No. 14 Squadron	No. 74 Squadron	Scrapped	Nose section preserved (Bentwaters)
XV470	F-4M	No. 2 Squadron	No. 56 Squadron	Stored (Akrotiri)	
XV474	F-4M	No. 17 Squadron	No. 74 Squadron	Preserved (Duxford)	First Phantom in air superiority grey
XV489	F-4M	No. 2 Squadron	No. 92 Squadron	Scrapped	Nose section preserved
XV490	F-4M	No. 54 Squadron	No. 74 Squadron	Scrapped	Nose section preserved (Newark)
XV497	F-4M	No. 41 Squadron	No. 74 Squadron	Preserved (Flixton)	Final RAF Phantom to fly
XV499	F-4M	No. 228 OCU	No. 74 Squadron	Scrapped	Nose section stored (St Athan)
XV581	F-4K	No. 43 Squadron		Scrapped	Nose section preserved (Stafford)
XV582	F-4K	No. 43 Squadron	No. 228 OCU	Preserved (St Athan)	
XV586	F-4K	892 Naval Air Squadron	No. 43 Squadron	Preserved (Yeovilton)	
XV591	F-4K	892 Naval Air Squadron	No. 111 Squadron	Scrapped	Nose section preserved (Cosford)
ZE350	F-4J(UK)	No. 74 Squadron		Scrapped	Nose section preserved (Adelaide); Preserved in US Navy livery
ZE352	F-4J(UK)	No. 74 Squadron		Scrapped	Nose section preserved (Preston)
ZE359	F-4J(UK)	No. 74 Squadron		Preserved (Duxford)	Preserved in US Navy livery
ZE360	F-4J(UK)	No. 74 Squadron		Preserved (Kemble)	Formerly used for firefighting training Under restoration by BPAG

== Phantom bases ==
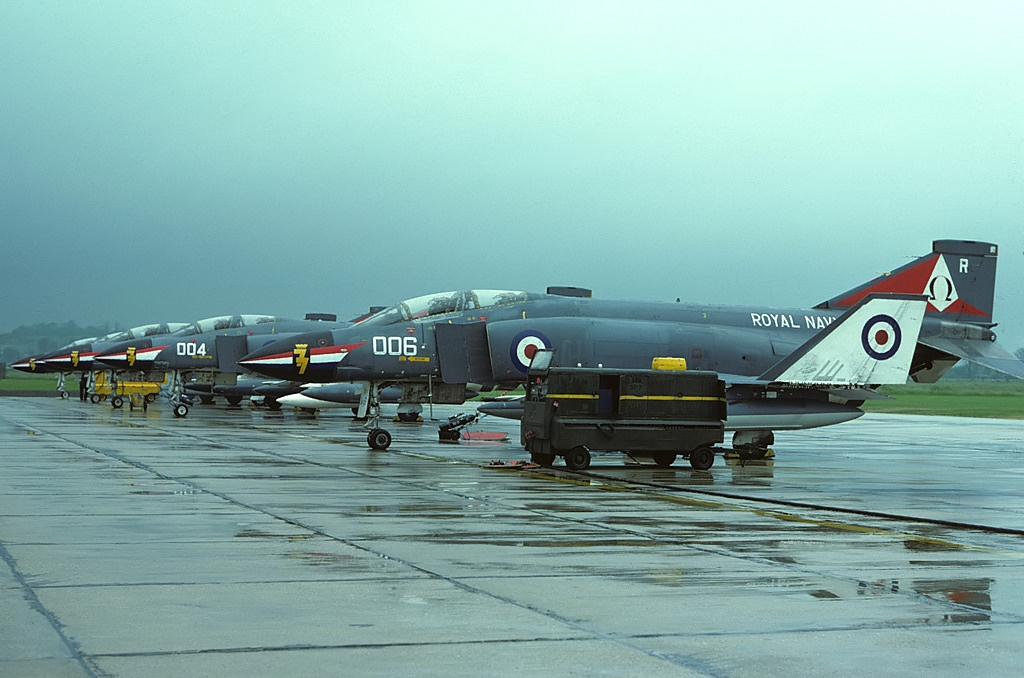
Phantoms of 892 Naval Air Squadron on the ramp at RNAS Yeovilton.

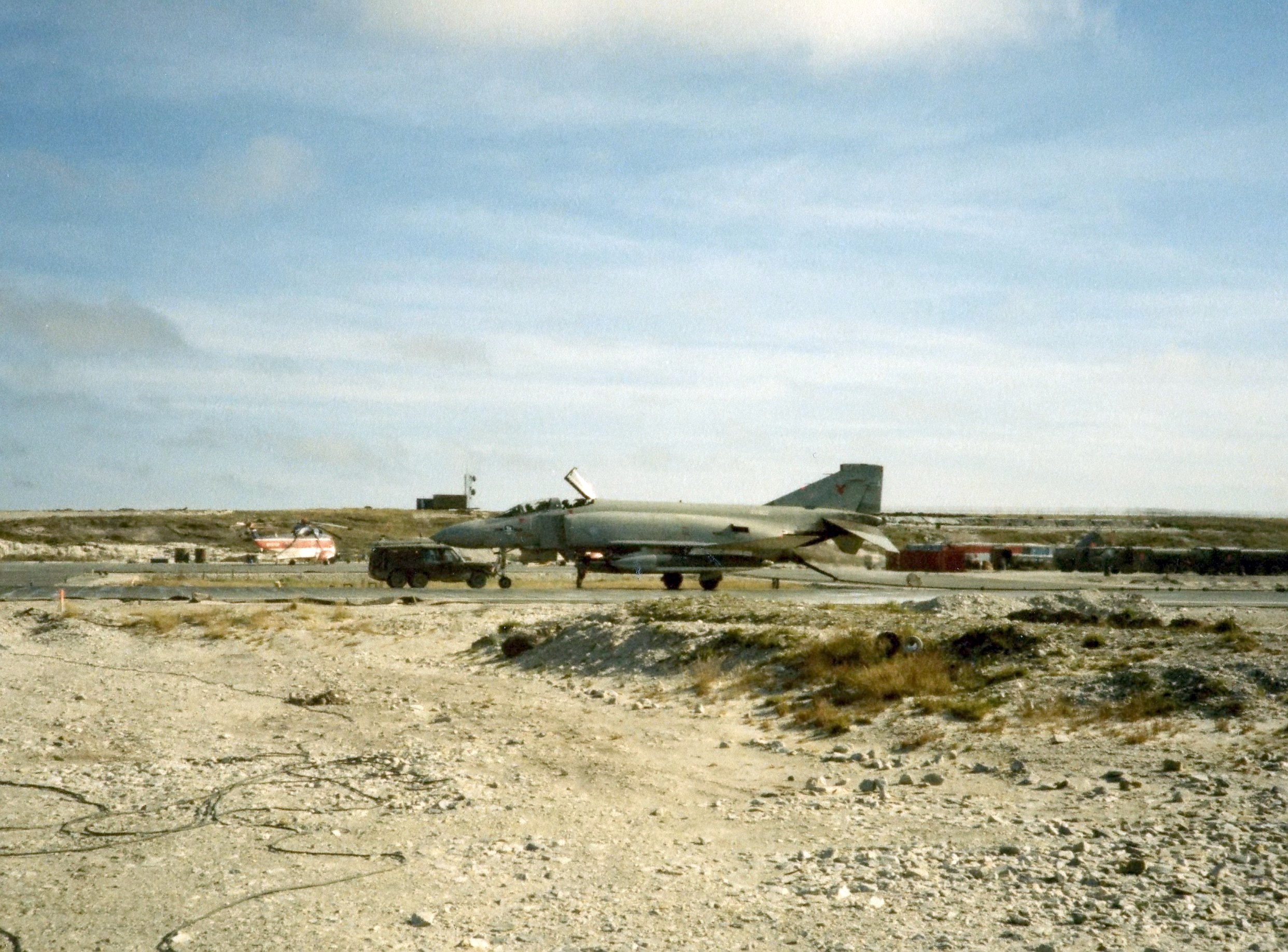
A Phantom of No. 23 Squadron catches the wire upon landing at RAF Stanley.

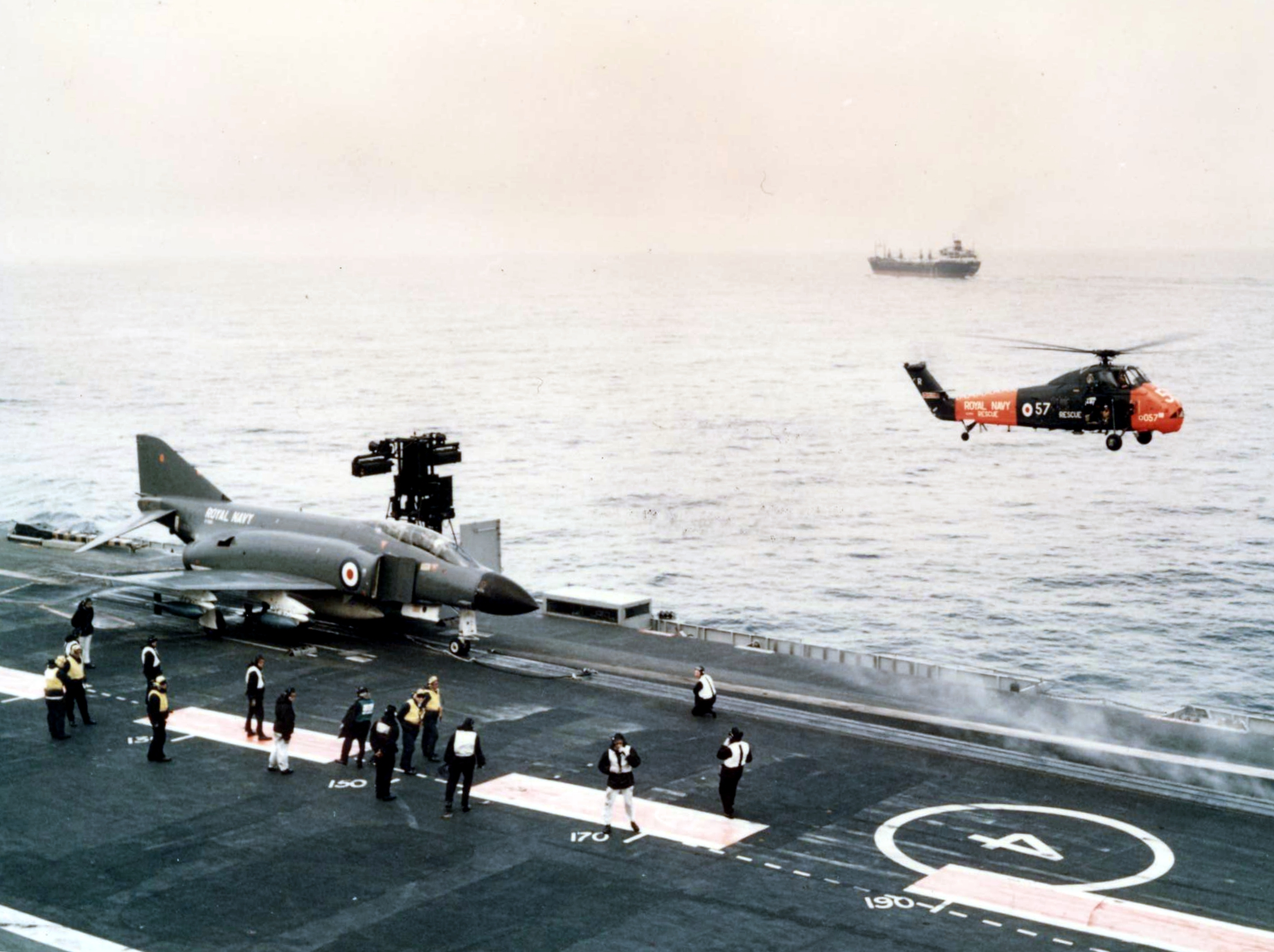
A Phantom attached to the A&AEE on the flight deck of HMS Ark Royal.

- United Kingdom
  - A&AEE Boscombe Down
    - A&AEE – November 1968 to January 1994 (Note: Phantoms were assigned to two separate elements within the A&AEE – 'A' Squadron was the Fast Jet Evaluation element, to which the majority of aircraft earmarked for testing were allocated, while 'C' Squadron was the Naval Testing element, intended to clear the aircraft for operation at sea. Both FG.1s and FGR.2s were assigned to 'A' Squadron, but only FG.1s were used by 'C' Squadron.)
  - RNAS Yeovilton
    - 700P Naval Air Squadron — April 1968 to February 1969
    - 767 Naval Air Squadron — January 1969 to August 1972
    - 892 Naval Air Squadron — March 1969 to September 1972
  - RAF Leuchars
    - 892 Naval Air Squadron — October 1972 to April 1978 (Note: 892 NAS deployed to sea aboard Ark Royal for the last time in April 1978. On 27 November 1978, while the ship was still in the Mediterranean, the air group disembarked for the final time, with the aircraft delivered to RAF St Athan to be handed over to the RAF. 892 NAS was finally disbanded on 15 December 1978.)
    - No. 43 Squadron — September 1969 to July 1989
    - No. 64 (R) Squadron (Note: No. 64 Squadron was the "shadow" squadron number of No. 228 Operational Conversion Unit) — April 1987 to January 1991
    - No. 111 Squadron — July 1974 to January 1990
    - Phantom Training Flight — August 1972 to May 1978
  - RAF Coningsby
    - No. 6 Squadron — May 1969 to October 1974
    - No. 29 Squadron — December 1974 to March 1987
    - No. 41 Squadron — April 1972 to April 1977
    - No. 54 Squadron — August 1969 to April 1974
    - No. 64 (R) Squadron — July 1970 to April 1987
  - RAF Wattisham
    - No. 23 Squadron — November 1975 to March 1983
    - No. 56 Squadron — March 1976 to June 1992
    - No. 74 Squadron — July 1984 to September 1992
    - Phantom Training Flight — January 1991 to January 1992
- Germany
  - RAF Laarbruch
    - No. 2 Squadron — December 1970 to February 1976
  - RAF Brüggen
    - No. 14 Squadron — June 1970 to January 1976
    - No. 17 Squadron — July 1970 to July 1975
    - No. 31 Squadron — July 1971 to June 1976
  - RAF Wildenrath
    - No. 19 Squadron — December 1976 to January 1992
    - No. 92 Squadron — March 1977 to July 1991
- Falkland Islands
  - RAF Stanley
    - No 23 Squadron — March 1983 to May 1985
    - No 29 Squadron (Detachment) — October 1982 to March 1983
  - RAF Mount Pleasant
    - No 23 Squadron — May 1985 to November 1988
    - No. 1435 Flight — November 1988 to June 1992
- Aircraft carriers
  - Although cross-decking with the aircraft carriers of the United States Navy was a regular occurrence for Fleet Air Arm aircraft, Ark Royal was the only regular shipboard home for the UK's Phantoms during their service with the Royal Navy. However, at the introduction of the Phantom into the Fleet Air Arm, two other aircraft carriers, one British and one American, briefly played host to UK Phantoms:
    - HMS Eagle — 2 June to 13 June 1969 (Note: Phantoms from the A&AEE's 'C' Squadron were initially deployed to Eagle to undertake a series of approaches and touch-and-go landings in March 1969; the aircraft operated from land while the ship was working up in the English Channel. Then, in June, A&AEE aircraft operated from Eagle undertaking full flight deck trials, including both catapult launch and arrested recovery.)
    - USS Saratoga — 16 October to 24 October 1969 (Note: The deployment to Saratoga was to allow 892 NAS to undertake carrier qualifications while Ark Royal was still in refit.)

== Accidents and incidents ==
Over the course of the Phantom's service with the Royal Navy and Royal Air Force, a total of 47 aircraft were lost to crashes, while another 8 were damaged and not repaired.

Date	Variant	Aircraft serial	Operator	Location	Country	Fatalities	Description	Notes
9 July 1969	FGR.2	XV395	No. 6 Squadron	Horncastle, Lincolnshire	United Kingdom	0	Crash due to loss of hydraulic pressure leading to locking of controls	
3 May 1970	FG.1	XV566	A&AEE (Note: On loan from 892 Naval Air Squadron.)	Lyme Bay, Dorset	United Kingdom	2	Crashed into Lyme Bay; no trace of aircraft found	
19 May 1971	FG.1	XT862	767 Naval Air Squadron	Off Newquay, Cornwall	United Kingdom	0	Crash due to engine flameout	
29 June 1971	FG.1	XV565	892 Naval Air Squadron	Off Mayport, Florida	United States	0	Crash while undertaking low level air combat manoeuvring	
12 October 1971	FGR.2	XV479	No. 54 Squadron	Holstebro, Holstebro Municipality	Denmark	0+2 (Note: The aircrew survived, but two civilians on the ground were killed.)	Crash due to engine failure	
15 October 1971	FGR.2	XT904	No. 228 OCU	Off Cromer, Norfolk	United Kingdom	0	Crash following loss of aerodynamic control in spin	
10 January 1972	FG.1	XT876	767 Naval Air Squadron	Trevose Head, Cornwall	United Kingdom	1	Crash following loss of aerodynamic control in spin	
14 February 1972	FGR.2	XT913	No. 228 OCU	Off Happisburgh, Norfolk	United Kingdom	0	Crash due to hydraulic failure	
20 November 1972	FGR.2	XV477	No. 6 Squadron	Scarrowmanwick Fell, Cumbria	United Kingdom	2	Crash into Fell as a result of attempt to climb to altitude due to poor visibility at lower level	
1 June 1973	FGR.2	XV397	No. 17 Squadron	Kempen, North Rhine-Westphalia	West Germany	1	Crash following steep dive as a result of instrument failure	
25 June 1973	FGR.2	XV440	No. 31 Squadron	Off Vlieland, Friesland	Netherlands	2	Crash believed to be due to pilot error	
17 July 1973	FG.1	XT871	892 Naval Air Squadron	Firth of Forth	United Kingdom	0	Crash due to engine failure	
22 August 1973	FGR.2	XV427	No. 17 Squadron	Arfeld, North-Rhine Westphalia	West Germany	2	Crashed into high-ground during low level sortie	
15 October 1973	FG.1	XT869	892 Naval Air Squadron	Tentsmuir Forest, Fife	United Kingdom	0	Crash due to engine failure	
9 August 1974	FGR.2	XV493	No. 41 Squadron	Fordham Fen, Norfolk	United Kingdom	2+1 (Note: Both the crew of the Phantom and the pilot of the second aircraft were killed.)	Crash following mid-air collision	
11 October 1974	FGR.2	XV431	No. 31 Squadron	RAF Brüggen	West Germany	0	Crash due to wing tips being left unlocked and folding on take-off	
21 November 1974	FGR.2	XV441	No. 14 Squadron	Maasbree, Limburg	Netherlands	0	Crash due to engine fire on take-off	
3 March 1975	FGR.2	XV416	No. 111 Squadron	Coningsby, Lincolnshire	United Kingdom	0	Crash due to engine failure	
18 September 1975	FG.1	XV580	No. 43 Squadron	Kirriemuir, Tayside	United Kingdom	0	Crash due to loss of control during practice sortie for air display	
24 November 1975	FGR.2	XV405	No. 228 OCU	Skegness, Lincolnshire	United Kingdom	0	Crash due to loss of control	
17 December 1975	FGR.2	XV463	No. 41 Squadron	Mawbray, Cumbria	United Kingdom	2	Crash due to loss of control	
23 July 1976	FGR.2	XV417	No. 29 Squadron	Mablethorpe, Lincolnshire	United Kingdom	0	Crash during air combat manoeuvring when wing tip folded due to loose securing bolt	
18 May 1977	FG.1	XV588	892 Naval Air Squadron	RAF Leuchars	United Kingdom	0	Aircraft burnt out due to engine fire during aborted take-off	
12 May 1978	FG.1	XT868	892 Naval Air Squadron	RAF Leuchars	United Kingdom	1	Crash due to engine flameout	
24 July 1978	FGR.2	XV483	No. 92 Squadron	Drenke, North-Rhine Westphalia	West Germany	2	Crash during practice intercept	
4 August 1978	FGR.2	XV403	No. 111 Squadron	Off Aberdeen, Aberdeenshire	United Kingdom	2	Crash during practice intercept	
23 November 1978	FG.1	XT598	No. 111 Squadron	St Andrews Bay, Fife	United Kingdom	2	Crash during landing approach	
28 February 1979	FG.1	XV578	No. 111 Squadron	Off Montrose, Angus	United Kingdom	0	Crash due to engine failure	
5 March 1980	FGR.2	XV436	No. 29 Squadron	RAF Coningsby	United Kingdom	0	Aircraft ran off runway having missed arrestor cable following hydraulic failure	
3 June 1980	FG.1	XV589	No. 111 Squadron	RAF Alconbury	United Kingdom	0	Crash due to loss of aerodynamic stability from nose radome unlocking and folding back	
11 July 1980	FGR.2	XV418	No. 92 Squadron	Lohne, Lower Saxony	West Germany	2	Crash due to loss of control during manoeuvring	
12 November 1980	FGR.2	XV413	No. 29 Squadron	Off Cromer, Norfolk	United Kingdom	2	Crashed into the North Sea during night flying	
9 December 1980	FGR.2	XV414	No. 23 Squadron	Off Great Yarmouth, Norfolk	United Kingdom	0	Crash due to fire caused by ignition of fuel leak	
9 July 1981	FG.1	XT866	No. 43 Squadron	RAF Leuchars	United Kingdom	0	Crash on landing due to loss of control as a result of slipstream	
14 April 1982	FGR.2	XT912	No. 228 OCU	Billinghay, Lincolnshire	United Kingdom	0	Crash due to mid-air collision with second aircraft in formation	
7 July 1982	FGR.2	XV491	No. 29 Squadron	Off Cromer, Norfolk	United Kingdom	2	Crash in fog due to faulty altimeter	
17 October 1983	FGR.2	XV484	No. 23 Squadron	Mount Usbourne, Falkland Islands	Falkland Islands	2	Crashed into mountain following descent through cloud	
31 July 1985	FG.1	XT857	No. 111 Squadron	RAF Leuchars	United Kingdom	0	Aircraft overran runway on landing	
7 January 1986	FGR.2	XV434	No. 29 Squadron	Walden Head, North Yorkshire	United Kingdom	0	Crash due to loss of control	
3 July 1986	FGR.2	XV471	No. 19 Squadron	Rath-Anhoven, North-Rhine Westphalia	West Germany	0	Crash due to fire destroying stabilator control unit, leading to total loss of control	
26 August 1987	F.3	ZE358	No. 74 Squadron	Pant-y-Gwair, Dyfed	United Kingdom	2	Crash while undertaking low level air combat manoeuvring	
7 September 1987	FG.1	XT861	No. 43 Squadron	Off Firth of Tay, Perthshire	United Kingdom	0	Crash as a result of mid-air collision	
20 April 1988	FG.1	XT860	No. 43 Squadron	Leuchars, Fife	United Kingdom	2	Crash as a result of poor visibility due to sea fog	
2 August 1988	FGR.2	XV501	No. 56 Squadron	Mayenne, Pays de la Loire	France	0	Crash due to loss of control during practice intercept	
23 September 1988	FGR.2	XV428	No. 228 OCU	RAF Abingdon	United Kingdom	2	Crash during aerobatic manoeuvre	
18 October 1988	FGR.2	XV437	No. 92 Squadron	Holzminden, Lower Saxony	West Germany	0	Crash due to engine failure	
9 January 1989	FGR.2	XT908	No. 228 OCU	Off Dundee, Tayside	United Kingdom	1	Crash due to loss of control following pilot loss of consciousness	
24 April 1989	FGR.2	XT893	No. 56 Squadron	Flamborough Head, North Yorkshire	United Kingdom	0	Crash following loss of aerodynamic control in spin	
1 April 1990	FGR.2	XV478	No. 19 Squadron	RAF Wildenrath	West Germany	0	Aircraft caught fire while on the ground	
30 April 1990	FGR.2	XV402	No. 56 Squadron	RAF Valley	United Kingdom	0	Aircraft caught fire during landing due to tyre burst	
9 October 1990	FGR.2	XV394	No. 92 Squadron	RAF Wildenrath	Germany	0	Aircraft sustained minor damage on landing - not repaired due to imminent retirement of type	
8 January 1991	FGR.2	XV462	No. 19 Squadron	Off Limassol, Limassol District	Cyprus	0	Crash due to uncontrollable roll	
12 August 1991	FGR.2	XV438	No. 56 Squadron	RAF Wattisham	United Kingdom	0	Aircraft damaged due to mid-air collision - not repaired due to imminent retirement of type	
30 October 1991	FGR.2	XV421	No. 1435 Flight	Off McBrides Head, Falkland Islands	Falkland Islands	2	Crash believed due to crew disorientation in cloud	
15 July 1992	FGR.2	XV473	No. 56 Squadron	RAF Waddington	United Kingdom	0	Aircraft damaged by faulty fuel pump - not repaired due to imminent retirement of type	

== Phantom units ==
In addition to the various units of the Fleet Air Arm and RAF, the Phantom was operated by two units of the A&AEE – 'A' Squadron, which was responsible for fast jet evaluation, and 'C' Squadron, which dealt with naval aircraft testing.

Unit	Formed	Variant	Role	Previous operations (withdrawn)	Disbanded	Replaced by	Reference
700P Naval Air Squadron	1968	FG.1	Operational Evaluation (Note: 700 NAS is the assigned number to all units evaluating new aircraft for the Fleet Air Arm)	Wessex HAS.3 (Note: As 700H NAS) (1967)	1969 (Note: Upon being disbanded, 700P NAS formed the nucleus of 892 NAS)	Sea King HAS.1 (Note: As 700S NAS)	
767 Naval Air Squadron	1969	FG.1	Operational Conversion	Attacker FB.2 (1955) (Note: The Attacker was used as a trainer for deck landing control officers)	1972	N/A (Note: Phantom conversion training was undertaken by the Phantom Training Flight following the disbanding of 767 NAS)	
892 Naval Air Squadron	1969	FG.1	Fleet Air Defence	Sea Vixen FAW.2 (1969)	1978	N/A (Note: Following the decommissioning of HMS Ark Royal in 1978, the Royal Navy was no longer able to operate conventional fixed wing aircraft at sea. The British Aerospace Sea Harrier was introduced into both the air defence (replacing the Phantom) and strike (replacing the Buccaneer) roles in the Fleet Air Arm with 800 NAS and 801 NAS in 1980)	
No. 2 Squadron	1970	FGR.2	Tactical Reconnaissance	Hunter FR.10 (1970)	1976	Jaguar GR.1	
No. 6 Squadron	1969	FGR.2	Close Air Support/Tactical Strike	Canberra B.16 (1969)	1974	Jaguar GR.1	
No. 14 Squadron	1970	FGR.2	Close Air Support/Tactical Strike	Canberra B(I).8 (1970)	1975	Jaguar GR.1	
No. 17 Squadron	1970	FGR.2	Close Air Support/Tactical Strike	Canberra PR.7 (Note: The Canberra was used in the tactical reconnaissance role) (1970)	1975	Jaguar GR.1	
No. 19 Squadron	1977	FGR.2	Air Defence	Lightning F.2A (1977)	1992	Hawk T.1 (Note: The instances where the Phantom was replaced in squadron service by the Hawk were a result of the "Options for Change" defence cuts, with the squadrons being transferred to training roles) (Note: In September 1992, two of the existing Hawk squadrons attached to No. 7 Flying Training School received the identities of former Phantom squadrons, with No. 63(R) Squadron becoming No. 19(R) Squadron, and No. 151(R) Squadron becoming No. 92(R) Squadron. The following month, a third Hawk squadron was formed as part of No. 4 Flying Training School with the identity of No. 74(R) Squadron.)	
No. 23 Squadron	1975	FGR.2	Air Defence	Lightning F.3/F.6 (1975)	1988	Tornado F.3	
No. 29 Squadron	1975	FGR.2	Air Defence	Lightning F.3/F.6 (1975)	1987	Tornado F.3	
No. 31 Squadron	1971	FGR.2	Close Air Support/Tactical Strike	Canberra PR.7 (1971)	1976	Jaguar GR.1	
No. 41 Squadron	1972	FGR.2	Tactical Reconnaissance (Note: 41 Squadron converted to this role from being an air defence SAM squadron)	Bloodhound Mk.2 SAM (1970)	1977	Jaguar GR.1	
No. 43 Squadron	1969	FG.1	Air Defence	Hunter FGA.9 (Note: The Hunter was used in the close air support role) (1967)	1989	Tornado F.3	
No. 54 Squadron	1969	FGR.2	Close Air Support/Tactical Strike	Hunter FGA.9 (1969)	1974	Jaguar GR.1	
No. 56 Squadron	1976	FGR.2	Air Defence	Lightning F.6 (1976)	1992	Tornado F.3 (Note: This unit became the "shadow" squadron number of 229 OCU, the Tornado OCU)	
No. 64 Squadron	1968	FGR.2 (Note: No. 228 Operational Conversion Unit was the training unit for the FGR.2 from 1968 until 1978, with training on the FG.1 provided first by 767 Naval Air Squadron, and then the Phantom Training Flight. 228 OCU assumed responsibility for all Phantom training in 1978.)	Operational Conversion	Javelin FAW.7/FAW.9 (Note: The Javelin squadron was an operational interceptor unit) (1967)	1991	N/A	
No. 74 Squadron	1984	F.3	Air Defence	Lightning F.6 (1971)	1992	Hawk T.1A	
No. 92 Squadron	1977	FGR.2	Air Defence	Lightning F.2A (1977)	1991	Hawk T.1A	
No. 111 Squadron	1974	FGR.2	Air Defence	Lightning F.3/F.6 (1974)	1990	Tornado F.3	
No. 1435 Flight	1988	FGR.2	Air Defence	N/A (Note: The original No. 1435 Flight served from December 1941 to April 1945)	1992	Tornado F.3	
Phantom Training Flight (Note: The Phantom Training Flight was originally established in 1972 as the FG.1 conversion unit following the disbanding of 767 NAS. It was later reformed to provide refresher training on the FGR.2 in the final year of RAF Phantom operations.)	1972	FG.1	Operational Conversion	N/A	1978	N/A	
Phantom Training Flight	1991	FGR.2	Refresher Training	N/A	1992	N/A	

== Bibliography ==
- Baker, A.D. (1998). The Naval Institute Guide to Combat Fleets of the World 1998–1999: Their Ships, Aircraft and Systems. Annapolis, Maryland: Naval Institute Press. ISBN 978-0-13017-120-7.
- Ballance, Theo; Howard, Lee; Sturtivant, Ray (2016). The Squadrons and Units of the Fleet Air Arm. Staplefield, West Sussex, UK: Air Britain Historians. ISBN 978-0-85130-489-2.
- Davies, Peter E. (2016). USN McDonnell Douglas F-4 Phantom II. Oxford, UK: Osprey Publishing. ISBN 978-1-47280-495-2.
- Gledhill, David (2012). The Phantom in Focus: A Navigator's Eye on Britain's Cold War Warrior. Stroud, UK: Fonthill Media. ISBN 978-1-78155-048-9.
- Gledhill, David (2017). Phantom in the Cold War: RAF Wildenrath, 1977–1992. Barnsley, UK: Pen & Sword Books. ISBN 978-1-52670-408-5.
- Hobbs, David (2009). A Century of Carrier Aviation: The Evolution of Ships and Shipborne Aircraft. Barnsley, UK: Seaforth Publishing. ISBN 978-1-78346-931-4.
- Hobbs, David (1992). Aircraft of the Royal Navy since 1945. Liskeard, UK: Maritime Books. ISBN 978-0-90777-106-7.
- Hobbs, David (2013). British Aircraft Carriers: Design, Development & Service Histories. Barnsley, UK: Seaforth Publishing. ISBN 978-1-84832-138-0.
- Martin, Patrick (2012). British Phantoms: The Phantom FG Mk.1 and FGR Mk.2 in Royal Navy and RAF Service 1966–1978. Erlangen: Double Ugly Books. ISBN 978-3-935687-84-3.
- McLelland, Tim (2017). Britain's Cold War Fighters. London, UK: Fonthill. ISBN 978-1-78155-630-6.
- Rawlings, John (1985). "The Tigers are back". RAF Yearbook. ABC: 32–39.
