= McDonnell FH Phantom =

Early US twinjet fighter aircraft

FH Phantom
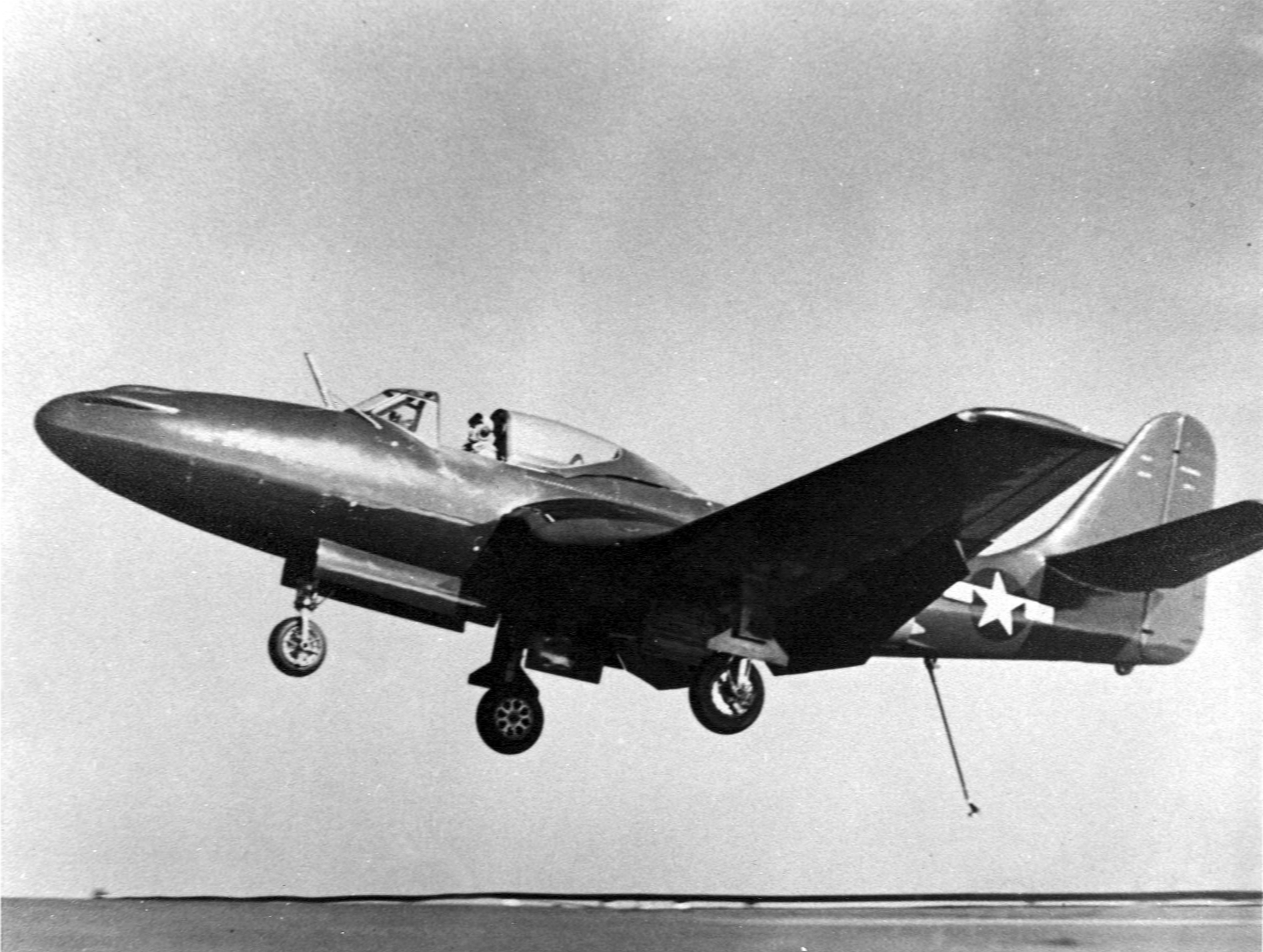
- An XFD-1 Phantom landing aboard USS Franklin D. Roosevelt in 1946

General information
- Type: Carrier-based fighter aircraft
- Manufacturer: McDonnell Aircraft
- Primary users: United States Navy United States Marine Corps
- Number built: 62

History
- Introduction date: August 1947
- First flight: 26 January 1945
- Retired: 1949 (USN, USMC); July 1954 (USNR)
- Developed into: McDonnell F2H Banshee

The McDonnell FH Phantom is a twinjet, straight-wing, carrier-based fighter aircraft designed and produced by the American aviation firm McDonnell Aircraft. A first-generation jet fighter, the Phantom was the first purely jet-powered aircraft to land on an American aircraft carrier in 1946, (Note: The first aircraft to land on an American carrier under jet power was the unconventional composite propeller-jet Ryan FR Fireball, designed to utilize its piston engine during takeoff and landing. On 6 November 1945, the piston engine of an FR-1 failed on final approach; the pilot started the jet engine and landed, thereby performing the first jet-powered carrier landing, albeit unintentionally.) as well as being the first jet aircraft to be deployed by the United States Marine Corps.

Developed during the latter half of World War II for the United States Navy (USN) to harness the newly-developed turbojet engine, an order for three prototype aircraft was placed in August 1943. Despite its then-unconventional propulsion, much of the airframe conformed to design conventions of the era; designed purely for aerial combat, it was unable to be used as a fighter-bomber. Development was protracted due to engine-related difficulties, chiefly the availability of the Westinghouse J30-WE-20 powerplant to fit into the prototype, delaying progress by roughly one year. The XFD-1 prototype performed its maiden flight on 26 January 1945; during subsequent flights, it became the first USN aircraft to exceed 500 mph (434 kn, 805 km/h). Originally designated the FD Phantom, this was changed as the aircraft entered production to FH Phantom. During August 1947, the first squadron equipped with the type became active. Although only 62 aircraft were ever produced, the Phantom helped prove the viability of carrier-based jet fighters and provide the USN with its first operational aircraft using such propulsion.

The availability of more powerful engines led to McDonnell proceeding with the development of the follow-on F2H Banshee which, while derived from the Phantom, shared little in terms of components due to various elements being redesigned. The arrival of the Banshee in the late 1940s led to the Phantom being promptly relegated to secondary duties, such as training pilots in preparation for operating newer jet aircraft, all examples being transferred to the United States Naval Reserve by late 1949. As such, while the Banshee became one of the two most important naval jet fighters of the Korean War, the Phantom never saw live combat. Nevertheless, both the Phantom and Banshee established McDonnell as an important supplier of naval aircraft. During the late 1950s, McDonnell chose to bring the name back with the third-generation, Mach 2-capable McDonnell Douglas F-4 Phantom II, the most versatile and widely used Western combat aircraft of the Vietnam War era.

== Design and development ==
=== Early work ===
In early 1943, officials within the United States Navy (USN) were impressed by McDonnell's audacious XP-67 Bat prototype. Thereafter, McDonnell was invited by the USN to cooperate in the development of a shipboard interceptor; the standout feature of this envisioned aircraft was that it would be powered by a turbojet engine, which were already under development by Westinghouse Electric Corporation. Three prototypes were ordered on 30 August 1943 and the designation XFD-1 (Note: The U.S. Navy had earlier used the XFD-1 designation for the prototype Douglas XFD biplane fighter, which did not enter production due to changing Navy requirements.) was assigned. Under the 1922 United States Navy aircraft designation system, the letter "D" before the dash designated the aircraft's manufacturer. The Douglas Aircraft Company had previously been assigned this letter, but the USN elected to reassign it to McDonnell because Douglas had not provided any fighters for navy service in years.

McDonnell's design team evaluated a number of engine combinations, varying from eight 9.5 in (24 cm) diameter engines down to two engines of 19 inches (48 cm) diameter. The final design used the two 19 in (48 cm) engines after it was found to be the lightest and simplest configuration. While early considerations had been made towards the incorporation of an auxiliary 'boost' engine, however, the design team were sufficiently satisfied with the power output of the base engines. The engines were buried in the wing root to keep both the intake and exhaust ducts short, an arrangement that offered greater aerodynamic efficiency in contrast to underwing nacelles. Furthermore, the engines were angled slightly outwards to protect the fuselage from the hot exhaust blast. Placement of the engines in the middle of the airframe, behind the center of gravity, required the cockpit with its bubble-style canopy to be placed ahead of the wing, which also granted the pilot excellent visibility in all directions. The long nose allowed designers to use tricycle gear, thereby elevating the engine exhaust path and reducing the risk that the hot blast would damage the aircraft carrier deck.

The construction methods and aerodynamic design of the Phantom were fairly conventional for the time, which was an intentional choice of the design team. Accordingly, the aircraft had unswept wings, a conventional empennage, and an aluminum monocoque structure with flush riveted aluminum skin. Folding wings were used to reduce the width of the aircraft in storage configuration. Provisions for four .50-caliber (12.7 mm) machine guns were made in the nose, while racks for eight 5 in (130 mm) High Velocity Aircraft Rockets could be fitted under the wings, although these were seldom used in service. Adapting a jet to carrier use was a much greater challenge than producing a land-based fighter because of slower landing and takeoff speeds required on a small carrier deck. The Phantom used split flaps on both the folding and fixed wing sections to enhance low-speed landing performance, but no other high-lift devices were used. Provisions were also made for Rocket Assisted Take Off (RATO) bottles to improve takeoff performance.

In May 1944, a mock-up of the aircraft was presented to officials, after which several design revisions were made; details related to the engine installation were the last to be firmed due to the development cycle of said engine having not yet been completed. While the maiden flight of the XFD-1 prototype had been scheduled to take place during early 1944, the persistence unavailability of the engine would delay its completion into XFD-1.

=== Into flight ===
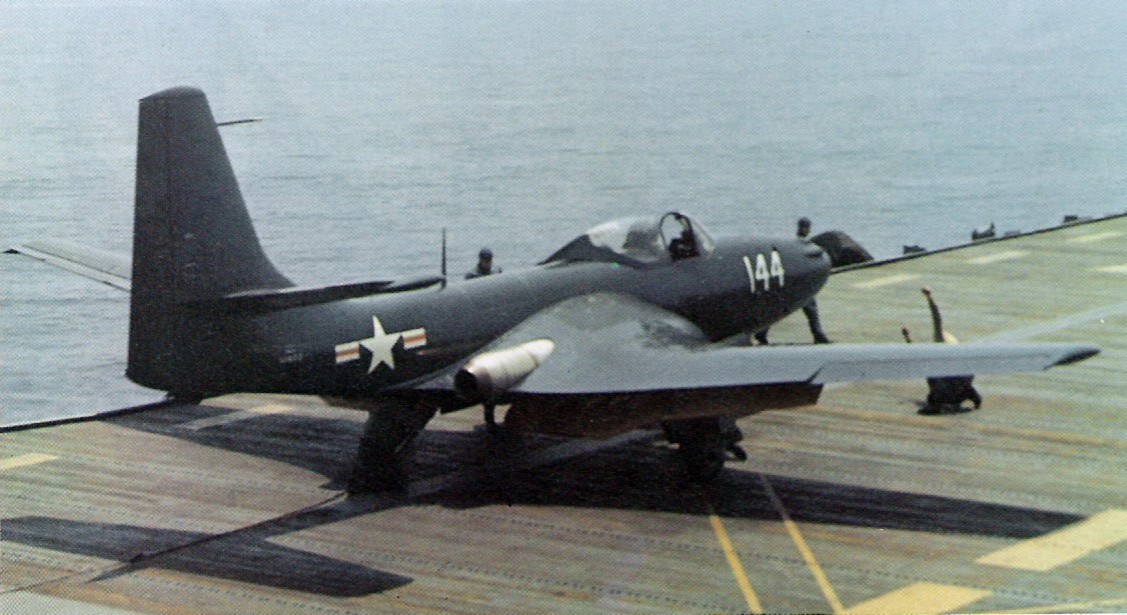
A U.S. Navy FH-1 of VF-17A Phantom Fighters taxies to the catapult during carrier qualifications on the light aircraft carrier Saipan, in May 1948

When the first XFD-1, serial number 48235, was completed in January 1945, only a single Westinghouse 19XB-2B engine was available for installation. Accordingly, ground runs and taxi tests were conducted using this single engine, and such was the confidence in the aircraft that the first flight on 26 January 1945 was made with only the one 19XB-2B engine in place. (Note: McDonnell assistant Chief Engineer Kendall Perkins has stated that this "first flight" was no more than a "hop", and that the real first flight would wait until a second engine was fitted a few days later.) Early flight testing of the aircraft revealed a bearing issue with the engine, requiring a one month suspension while this was rectified. It was during this test flight programme that the Phantom became the first USN aircraft to exceed 500 mph (434 kn, 805 km/h).

Following further flight testing, a production contract was awarded on 7 March 1945 for 100 FD-1 aircraft. Months later, in response to the end of the conflict, the Phantom production contract was reduced to 30 aircraft, then promptly increased back to 60.

The first prototype was lost in a fatal crash attributed to aileron failure) on 1 November 1945. The second and final Phantom prototype (serial number 48236) was completed early the next year; it incorporated improvements aimed at improving the aircraft's lateral control characteristics amongst other changes made to be more representative of production-standard aircraft. The second prototype became the first purely jet-powered aircraft to operate from an American aircraft carrier, completing four successful takeoffs and landings on 21 July 1946, from Franklin D. Roosevelt near Norfolk, Virginia. At the time, she was the largest carrier serving with the USN, which permitted the aircraft to take off without assistance from a catapult. The second prototype crashed on 26 August 1946.

Production Phantoms incorporated a number of design improvements. These included provisions for a flush-fitting centerline drop tank, an improved gunsight, and the addition of speed brakes. Production models used Westinghouse J30-WE-20 engines with 1,600 lbf (7.1 kN) of thrust per engine. The top of the vertical tail had a more square shape than the rounder tail used on the prototypes, and a smaller rudder was used to resolve problems with control surface clearance discovered during test flights. The horizontal tail surfaces were shortened slightly, while the fuselage was stretched by 19 in (48 cm). The amount of framing in the windshield was reduced to enhance pilot visibility. While the prototype Phantoms had a curved tip present on their vertical tailplane, production examples had squared-off tips instead.

Halfway through the production run, the navy reassigned the designation letter "D" back to Douglas, with the Phantom being redesignated FH-1. Including the two prototypes, a total of 62 Phantoms were finally produced, with the last FH-1 rolling off the assembly line in May 1948.

Realizing that the production of more powerful jet engines was imminent, McDonnell engineers proposed a more powerful variant of the Phantom while the original aircraft was still under development – a proposal that would lead to the design of the Phantom's replacement, the F2H Banshee. Although the new aircraft was originally envisioned as a modified Phantom, the need for heavier armament, greater internal fuel capacity, and other improvements eventually led to a substantially heavier and bulkier aircraft that shared few parts with its agile predecessor. Despite this, the two aircraft were similar enough that McDonnell was able to complete its first F2H-1 in August 1948, a mere three months after the last FH-1 had rolled off the assembly line.

== Operational history ==
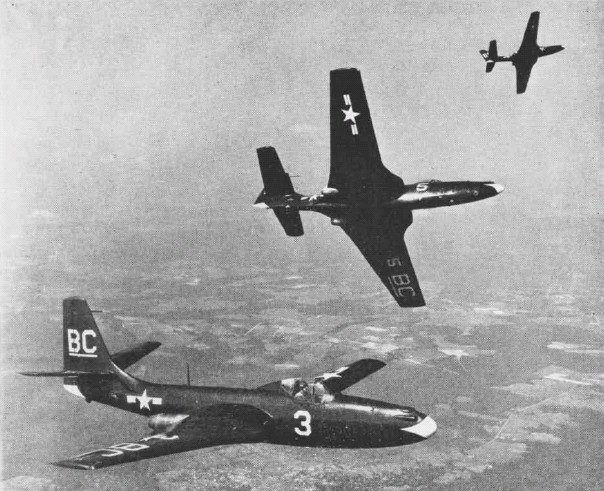
Three FH-1 Phantoms of VMF-122 in 1949

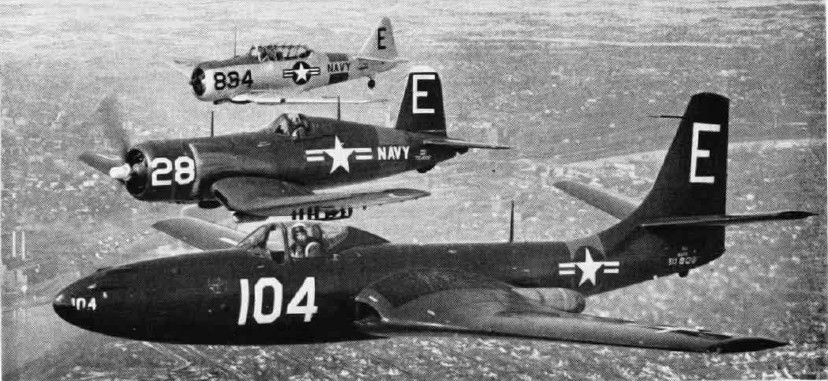
Three aircraft of the Minneapolis U.S. Naval Air Reserve (front to back): an FH-1 Phantom, an F4U-1 Corsair, and an SNJ Texan in 1951.

The first Phantoms were delivered to USN fighter squadron VF-17A (later redesignated VF-171) in August 1947; the squadron received a full complement of 24 aircraft on 29 May 1948. Beginning in November 1947, Phantoms were delivered to United States Marine Corps squadron VMF-122, making it the first USMC combat squadron to deploy jets. VF-17A became the USN's first fully operational jet carrier squadron when it deployed aboard USS Saipan on 5 May 1948. (Note: Squadron VF-5A, flying the North American FJ-1 Fury, had conducted the navy's first all-jet aircraft carrier operations at sea on 10 March 1948 aboard Boxer, but the entire squadron was not considered operational at the time.)

The Phantom was one of the first jets used by the U.S. military for exhibition flying. Three Phantoms used by the Naval Air Test Center were used by a unique demonstration team called the Gray Angels, whose members consisted entirely of naval aviators holding the rank of rear admiral (Daniel V. Gallery, Apollo Soucek and Edgar A. Cruise.) The team's name was an obvious play on the name of the recently formed U.S. Navy Blue Angels, who were still flying propeller-powered Grumman F8F Bearcats at the time. The "Grays" flew in various air shows during the summer of 1947, but the team was abruptly disbanded after their poorly timed arrival at a September air show in Cleveland, Ohio, nearly caused a head-on low-altitude collision with a large formation of other aircraft; their Phantoms were turned over to test squadron VX-3. The VMF-122 Phantoms were later used for air show demonstrations until they were taken out of service in 1949, with the team being known alternately as the Marine Phantoms or the Flying Leathernecks.

The Phantom's service as a frontline fighter would be short-lived. Its limited range and light armament – notably, its inability to carry bombs – made it best suited for duty as a point-defence interceptor aircraft. However, its speed and rate of climb were only slightly better than existing propeller-powered fighters and fell short of other contemporary jets, such as the Lockheed P-80 Shooting Star, prompting concerns that the Phantom would be outmatched by future enemy jets it might soon face. Moreover, recent experience in World War II had demonstrated the value of naval fighters that could double as fighter-bombers, a capability the Phantom lacked. Finally, the aircraft exhibited some design deficiencies – its navigational avionics were poor, it could not accommodate newly developed ejection seats, and the location of the machine guns in the upper nose caused pilots to be dazzled by muzzle flash.

The F2H Banshee and Grumman F9F Panther, both of which began flight tests around the time of the Phantom's entry into service, better satisfied the navy's desire for a versatile, long-range, high-performance jet. Consequently, the FH-1 saw little weapons training, and was primarily used for carrier qualifications to transition pilots from propeller-powered fighters to jets in preparation for flying the Panther or Banshee. In June 1949, VF-171 (VF-17A) re-equipped with the Banshee, and their Phantoms were turned over to VF-172; this squadron, along with the NATC, VX-3, and VMF-122, turned over their Phantoms to the United States Naval Reserve by late 1949 after receiving F2H-1 Banshees. The FH-1 would see training duty with the USNR until being replaced by the F9F Panther in July 1954; no examples ever saw combat, the type having been withdrawn from frontline service prior to the outbreak of the Korean War.

=== Civilian use ===
In 1964, Progressive Aero, Incorporated of Fort Lauderdale, Florida purchased three surplus Phantoms, intending to use them to teach civilians how to fly jets. A pair were stripped of military equipment and restored to flying condition, but the venture was unsuccessful, and the aircraft were soon retired once again.

== Variants ==
XFD-1
Company designation Model 11A, prototype aircraft powered by 1,165 lbf (5.18 kN) Westinghouse 19XB-2B engines (J-30). Two built.
FH-1 (FD-1)
Company designation Model 23, production version with 1,600 lbf (7.1 kN) Westinghouse J30-WE-20 engines (originally designated FD-1). 60 built.
FD-1N
Proposed night fighter variant.

== Operators ==
United States

- United States Navy
  - VX-3
  - VF-171 (VF-17A)
  - VF-172
  - Naval Air Reserve
- United States Marine Corps
  - VMF-122
  - VMF-311

== Aircraft on display ==
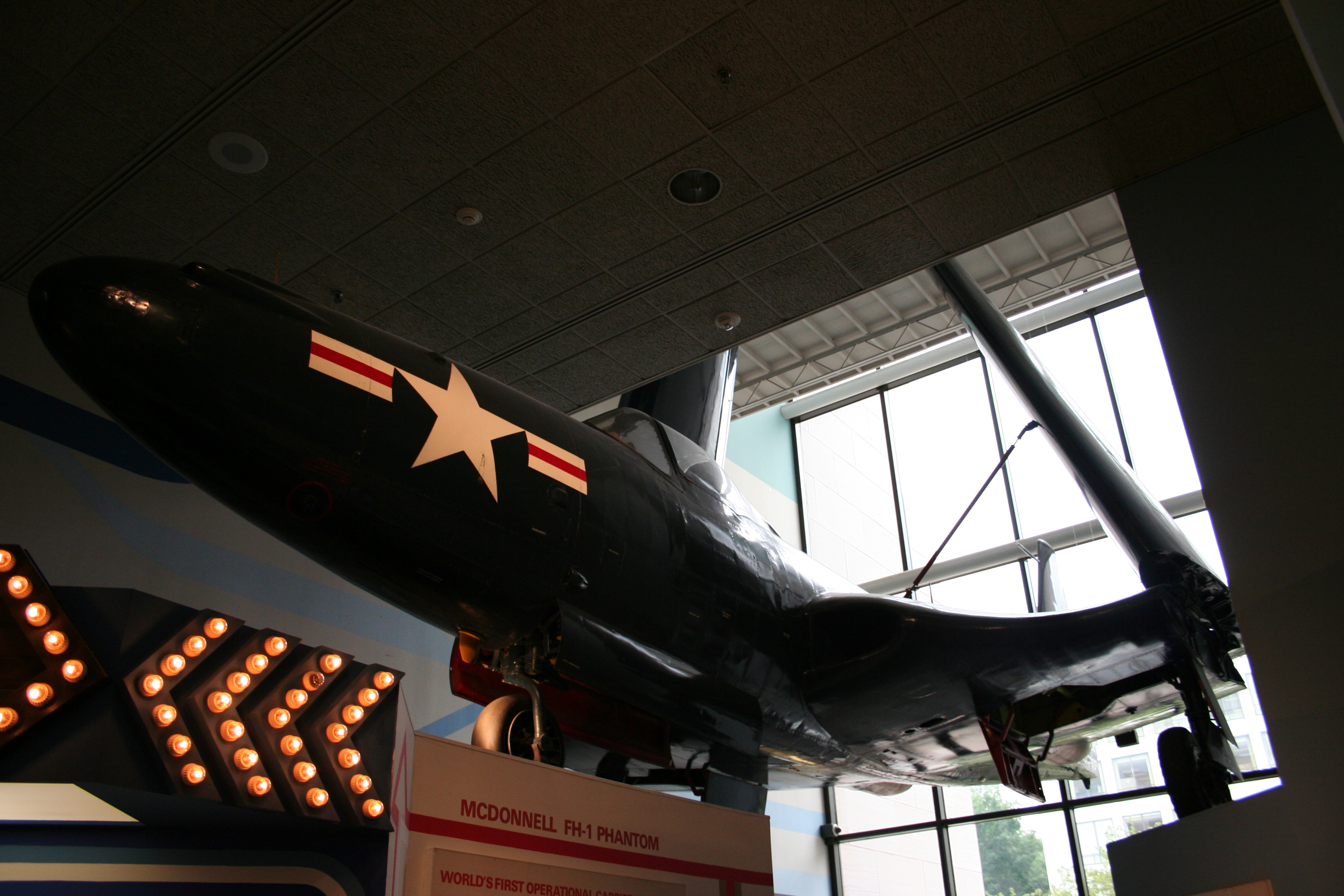
FH-1 Phantom on display in Washington, D.C.

FH-1

- BuNo 111759 - National Air and Space Museum of the Smithsonian Institution in Washington, D.C., United States. This aircraft served with Marine Fighter Squadron 122 (VMF-122). It was retired in April 1954, with a total of 418 flight hours. The aircraft was transferred to the Smithsonian by the U.S. Navy in 1959.
- BuNo 111768 - Pima Air & Space Museum, Tucson, Arizona, on loan from the National Museum of the Marine Corps, Triangle, Virginia. It has had a busy post-retirement life. Formerly a Progressive Aero aircraft c/n 456 (civil registration N4283A) it was placed on display at the Marine Corps Museum. The aircraft was later transferred to the St. Louis Aviation Museum, and then the National Warplane Museum in Geneseo, New York. In 2006 the aircraft was moved to the Wings of Eagles Discovery Center in Horseheads, New York., and moved to Tucson in 2016.
- BuNo 111793 - National Naval Aviation Museum at Naval Air Station Pensacola, Florida. This aircraft was accepted by the navy on 28 February 1948. After flying for a brief time with Marine Fighter Squadron (VMF) 122, the first Marine jet squadron, at Marine Corps Air Station Cherry Point, North Carolina, it was stricken from the naval inventory in 1949. The museum acquired the aircraft from National Jets, Inc., of Fort Lauderdale, Florida, in 1983.

== Specifications (FH-1 Phantom) ==
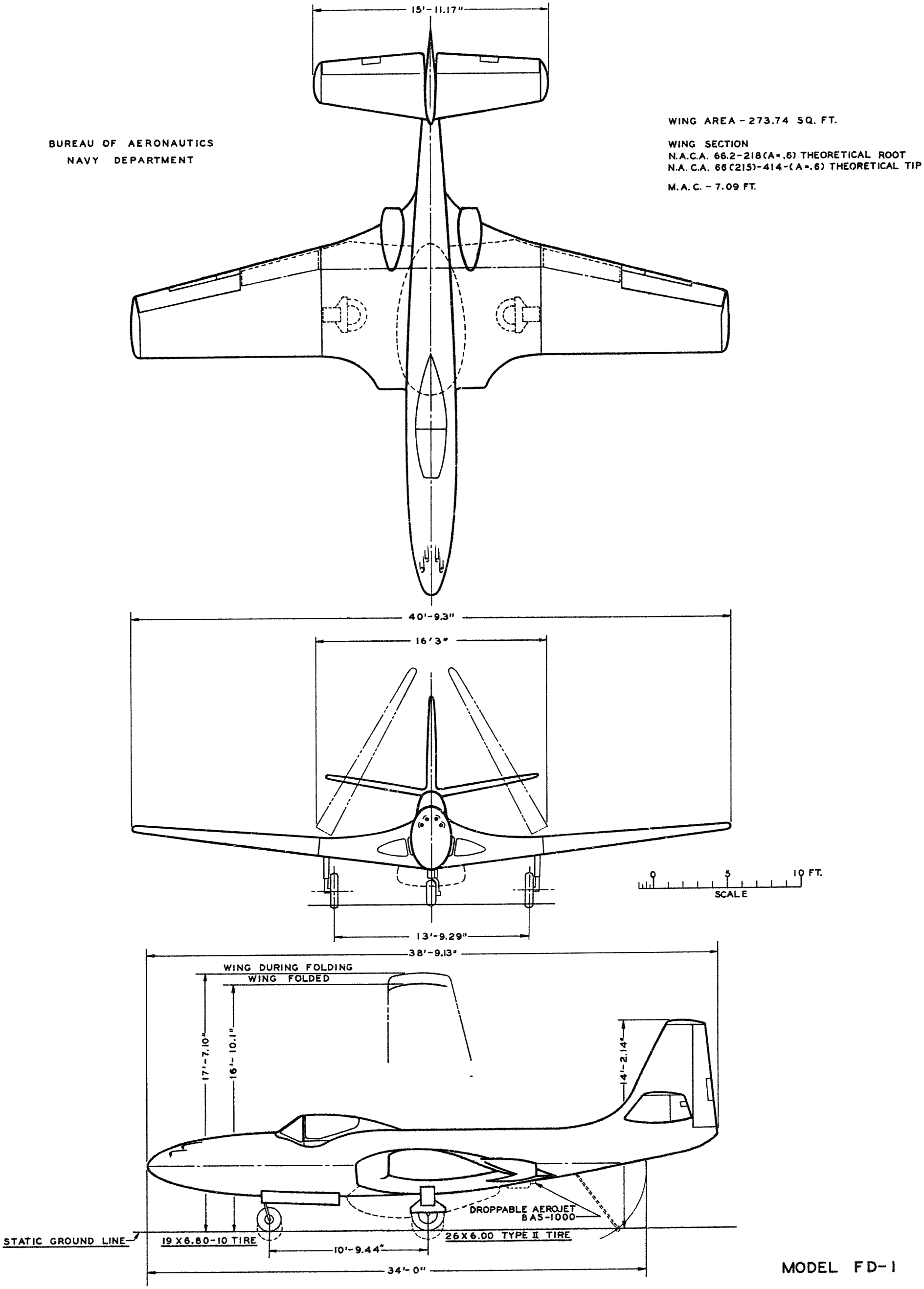
3-view line drawing of the McDonnell FD-1 Phantom

Data from Naval Fighters #3 : McDonnell FH-1 Phantom, and McDonnell Douglas Aircraft since 1920

General characteristics

- Crew: 1
- Length: 37 ft 3 in (11.35 m)
- Wingspan: 40 ft 9 in (12.42 m)
- Width: 16 ft 3 in (4.95 m) wings folded
- Height: 14 ft 2 in (4.32 m)
- Height folded: 16 ft 10 in (5 m)
- Wing area: 273.74 sq ft (25.431 m^{2})
- Airfoil: root: NACA 66-218 a=.6; tip: NACA 66-215-414 a=.6
- Empty weight: 6,683 lb (3,031 kg)
- Gross weight: 10,035 lb (4,552 kg)
- Max takeoff weight: 12,035 lb (5,459 kg)
- Fuel capacity: 375 US gal (312 imp gal; 1,420 L) gasoline internal, with optional 295 US gal (246 imp gal; 1,120 L) external belly tank.
- Powerplant: 2 × Westinghouse J30-WE-20 (or J30-P20) turbojet, 1,600 lbf (7.1 kN) thrust each (Westinghouse 19 XB-2B)
- Powerplant: 2 × Aerojet 14AS-1000 D5 JATO bottles, 1,000 lbf (4.4 kN) thrust each for 14 seconds

Performance

- Maximum speed: 505 mph (813 km/h, 439 kn) at 30,000 ft (9,100 m)
- Cruise speed: 248 mph (399 km/h, 216 kn)
- Landing speed: 80 mph (70 kn; 130 km/h)
- Range: 690 mi (1,110 km, 600 nmi)
- Ferry range: 1,400 mi (2,300 km, 1,200 nmi) with external belly tank.
- Service ceiling: 41,100 ft (12,500 m)
- Rate of climb: 4,230 ft/min (21.5 m/s)
- Wing loading: 36.4 lb/sq ft (178 kg/m^{2})
- Thrust/weight: 0.32

Armament

- Guns: 4 × .50 in (12.7 mm) machine guns
- Rockets: 8 × 5 in (127 mm) High Velocity Aircraft Rockets

== See also ==
Related development

- McDonnell F2H Banshee

Aircraft of comparable role, configuration, and era

- de Havilland Sea Vampire
- Grumman F9F Panther
- North American FJ-1 Fury
- Vought F6U Pirate

Related lists

- List of fighter aircraft
- List of military aircraft of the United States
