= Gray Angels =

1940s US Navy air show team

The US company McDonnell Aircraft received a request in 1942 for a jet fighter which could be operated from U.S. Navy aircraft carriers. The eventual result was the FH-1 Phantom, a twin-engined craft that was only moderately faster than the best propeller fighters of the time. The Navy ordered 100 planes (only 60 were actually built), and the first units were delivered in 1947. They were used to equip one Navy and two United States Marine Corps squadrons. They were the first carrier-based pure jet fighters acquired and put into operational service by the Navy.

The Marines used a few of their planes to form an aerial formation-flight demonstration team, dubbed The Flying Leathernecks (which was also the title of a 1951 film starring John Wayne, concerned with Marine aviation activity in World War II).

Three flag officers in the Navy, Admiral Daniel V. Gallery and Rear Admirals Apollo Soucek and Edgar A. Cruise, checked themselves out in the Phantom and made fly-by appearances at the inauguration ceremony of New York City's Idlewild Airport and the 1948 Cleveland Air Races. They referred to themselves as The Gray Angels, a reference to the actual Navy flight-demonstration team known as the Blue Angels (formed in 1945, the Blue Angels' official title was U.S. Navy Flight Demonstration Team, and they were first referred to as Lancers, but within a few months the references were changed to Blue Angels).

The "Grays" flew in various air shows during the summer of 1947, but the team was abruptly disbanded after their poorly timed arrival at a September air show in Cleveland, Ohio nearly caused a head-on low-altitude collision with a large formation of other aircraft.
