= VF-171 =

Fighter Squadron 171
- Active: 1 April 1944 – 15 March 1958
- Country: United States
- Branch: United States Navy
- Role: Fighter aircraft
- Part of: Inactive
- Nickname(s): Phantom Fighters; Aces
- Engagements: World War II

Aircraft flown
- Fighter: F8F Bearcat; FH-1 Phantom; F2H-2/3 Banshee

Fighter Squadron 171 or VF-171 was an aviation unit of the United States Navy. Originally established as Fighter Squadron 82 (VF-82) on 1 April 1944, it was redesignated VF-17A on 15 November 1946, redesignated as VF-171 on 11 August 1948 and disestablished on 15 March 1958.

== Operational history ==
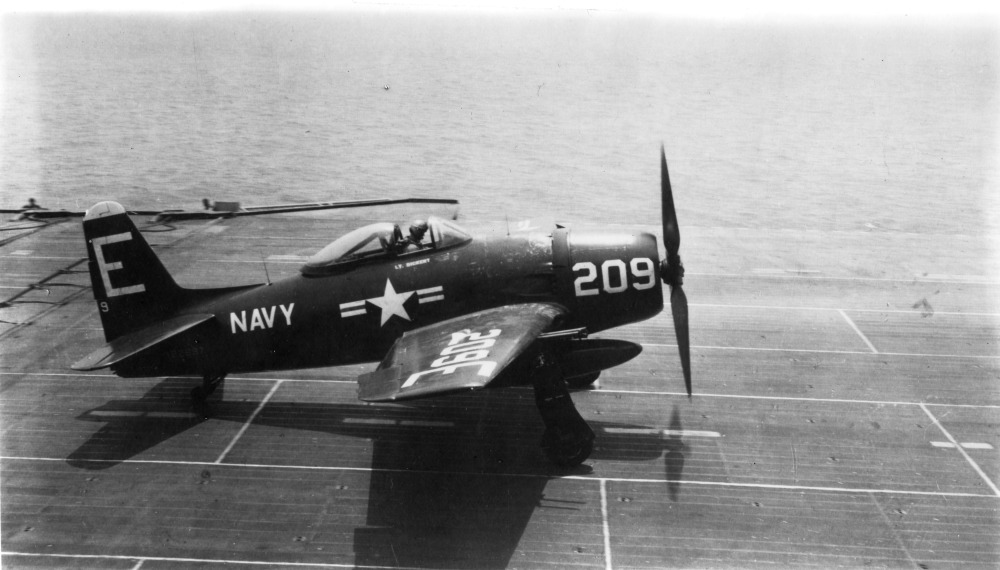
VF-82 F8F on USS Midway

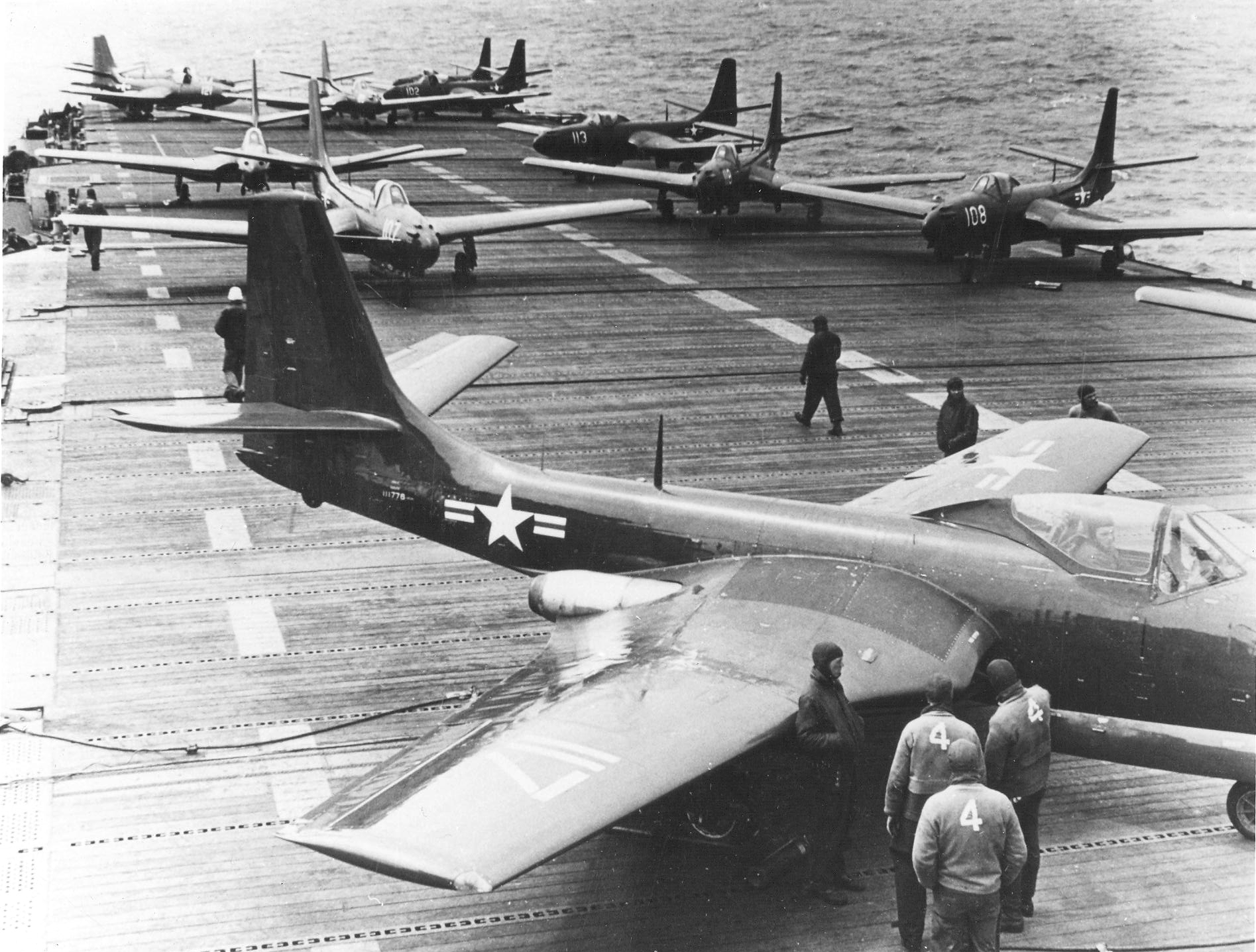
VF-17A FH-1s on USS Saipan in May 1948

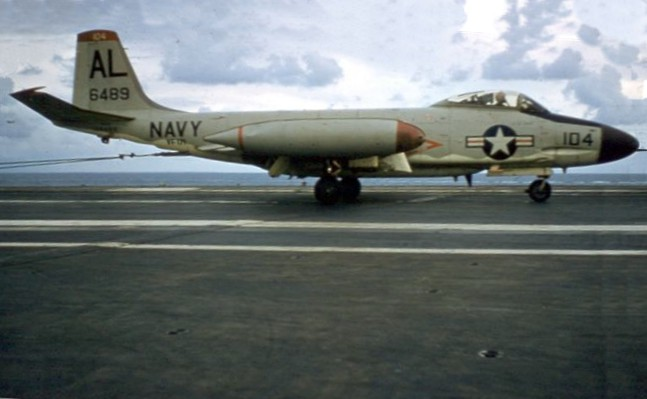
VF-171 F2H-3 lands on USS Franklin D. Roosevelt in 1958

VF-17A was the first Navy squadron to operate the McDonnell FH Phantom receiving its first aircraft in August 1947 and its full complement of 24 aircraft by 29 May 1948. VF-17A became the Navy's first fully operational jet carrier squadron when it deployed aboard USS Saipan on 5 May 1948.

Due to the shortcomings of the FH-1, VF-171 became the first squadron to be equipped with F2H-1 Banshees in March 1949. The first emergency use of an ejection seat by a U.S. aircraft occurred in August 1949 when a VF-171 pilot successfully ejected from his F2H-1 after losing control due to aircraft icing at high altitude.

VF-171 was part of Carrier Air Group 17 (CVG-17) embarked on USS Franklin D. Roosevelt when it took part in Exercise Mainbrace in September 1952.

VF-171 and CVG-17 embarked on USS Franklin D. Roosevelt for a Mediterranean deployment from July 1957 to March 1958. During this deployment it participated in Operation Deep Water in September 1957.

== Home port assignments ==
- NAS Quonset Point

== Aircraft assignment ==
- F8F Bearcat
- FH-1 Phantom
- F2H-2/3 Banshee

== Notable former members ==
- William N. Leonard

== See also ==
- History of the United States Navy
- List of inactive United States Navy aircraft squadrons
- List of United States Navy aircraft squadrons
