= Tuned pipe (disambiguation) =

A tuned pipe is a part of the exhaust system of some two-stroke engines.

Tuned pipe can also mean:

- In acoustics, a resonator, particularly but not only a tubular resonator.
- In music, an organ pipe.
- In music more generally, the resonator of any aerophone.
- In automotive engineering generally, the tuned exhaust system of a car or motorcycle engine.

== See also ==
- Helmholtz resonator.
