= Pressure charger =

Pressure charger may refer to:

- Exhaust pulse pressure charging
- Supercharger
- Turbocharger
