= Volumetric efficiency =

Measure of engine efficiency

Volumetric efficiency (VE) in internal combustion engine engineering is defined as the ratio of the equivalent volume of the fresh air drawn into the cylinder during the intake stroke (if the gases were at the reference condition for density) to the volume of the cylinder itself. The term is also used in other engineering contexts, such as hydraulic pumps and electronic components.

== Internal combustion engines ==
Volumetric Efficiency in an internal combustion engine design refers to the efficiency with which the engine can move the charge of fresh air into and out of the cylinders. It also denotes the ratio of equivalent air volume drawn into the cylinder to the cylinder's swept volume. This equivalent volume is commonly inserted into a mass estimation equation based upon Boyle's Gas Law. When VE is multiplied by the cylinder volume, an accurate estimate of cylinder air mass (charge) can be made for use in determining the required fuel delivery and spark timing for the engine.

The flow restrictions in the intake and exhaust systems create a reduction in the inlet flow which reduces the total mass delivery to the cylinder. Under some conditions, ram tuning may either increase or decrease the pumping efficiency of the engine. This happens when a favorable alignment of the pressure wave in the inlet (or exhaust) plumbing improves the flow through the valve. Increasing the pressure differential across the inlet valve typically increases VE throughout the naturally aspirated range. Adding intake manifold boost pressure from a supercharger or turbocharger can increase the VE, but the final calculation for cylinder airmass takes most of this benefit into account with the pressure term in n=PV/RT which is taken from the intake manifold pressure.

Many high performance cars use carefully arranged air intakes and tuned exhaust systems that use pressure waves to push air into and out of the cylinders, making use of the resonance of the system. Two-stroke engines are very sensitive to this concept and can use expansion chambers that return the escaping air-fuel mixture back to the cylinder. A more modern technique for four-stroke engines, variable valve timing, attempts to address changes in volumetric efficiency with changes in speed of the engine: at higher speeds the engine needs the valves open for a greater percentage of the cycle time to move the charge in and out of the engine.

Volumetric efficiencies above 100% can be reached by using forced induction such as supercharging or turbocharging. With proper tuning, volumetric efficiencies above 100% can also be reached by naturally aspirated engines. The limit for naturally aspirated engines is about 130%; these engines are typically of a DOHC layout with four valves per cylinder. This process is called inertial supercharging and uses the resonance of the intake manifold and the mass of the air to achieve pressures greater than atmospheric at the intake valve. With proper tuning (and dependent on the need for sound level control), VE's of up to 130% have been reported in various experimental studies.

More "radical" solutions include the sleeve valve design, in which the valves are replaced outright with a rotating sleeve around the piston, or alternately a rotating sleeve under the cylinder head. In this system the ports can be as large as necessary, up to that of the entire cylinder wall. However, there is a practical upper limit due to the strength of the sleeve, at larger sizes the pressure inside the cylinder can "pop" the sleeve if the port is too large.

== Hydraulic pumps ==
Volumetric efficiency in a hydraulic pump refers to the percentage of actual fluid flow out of the pump compared to the flow out of the pump without leakage. In other words, if the flow out of a 100cc pump is 92cc (per revolution), then the volumetric efficiency is 92%. The volumetric efficiency will change with the pressure and speed a pump is operated at, therefore when comparing volumetric efficiencies, the pressure and speed information must be available. When a single number is given for volumetric efficiency, it will typically be at the rated pressure and speed.

== Electronics ==
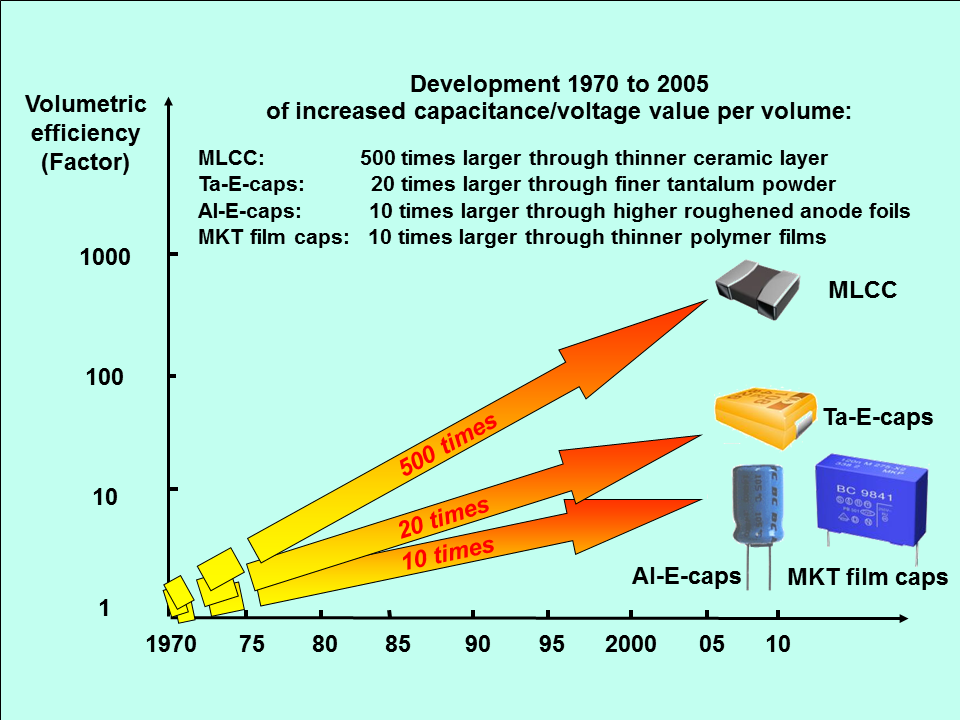
Capacitor volumetric efficiency increased from 1970 to 2005 (click image to enlarge)

In electronics, volumetric efficiency quantifies the performance of some electronic function per unit volume, usually in as small a space as possible. This is desirable since advanced designs need to cram increasing functionality into smaller packages, for example, maximizing the energy stored in a battery powering a cellphone. Besides energy storage in batteries, the concept of volumetric efficiency appears in design and application of capacitors, where the "CV product" is a figure of merit calculated by multiplying the capacitance (C) by the maximum voltage rating (V), divided by the volume. The concept of volumetric efficiency can be applied to any measurable electronic characteristic, including resistance, capacitance, inductance, voltage, current, energy storage, etc.

== See also ==
- Two-stroke power valve system
- Variable compression ratio
