= Tuned exhaust =

Optimisation of exhaust system geometry

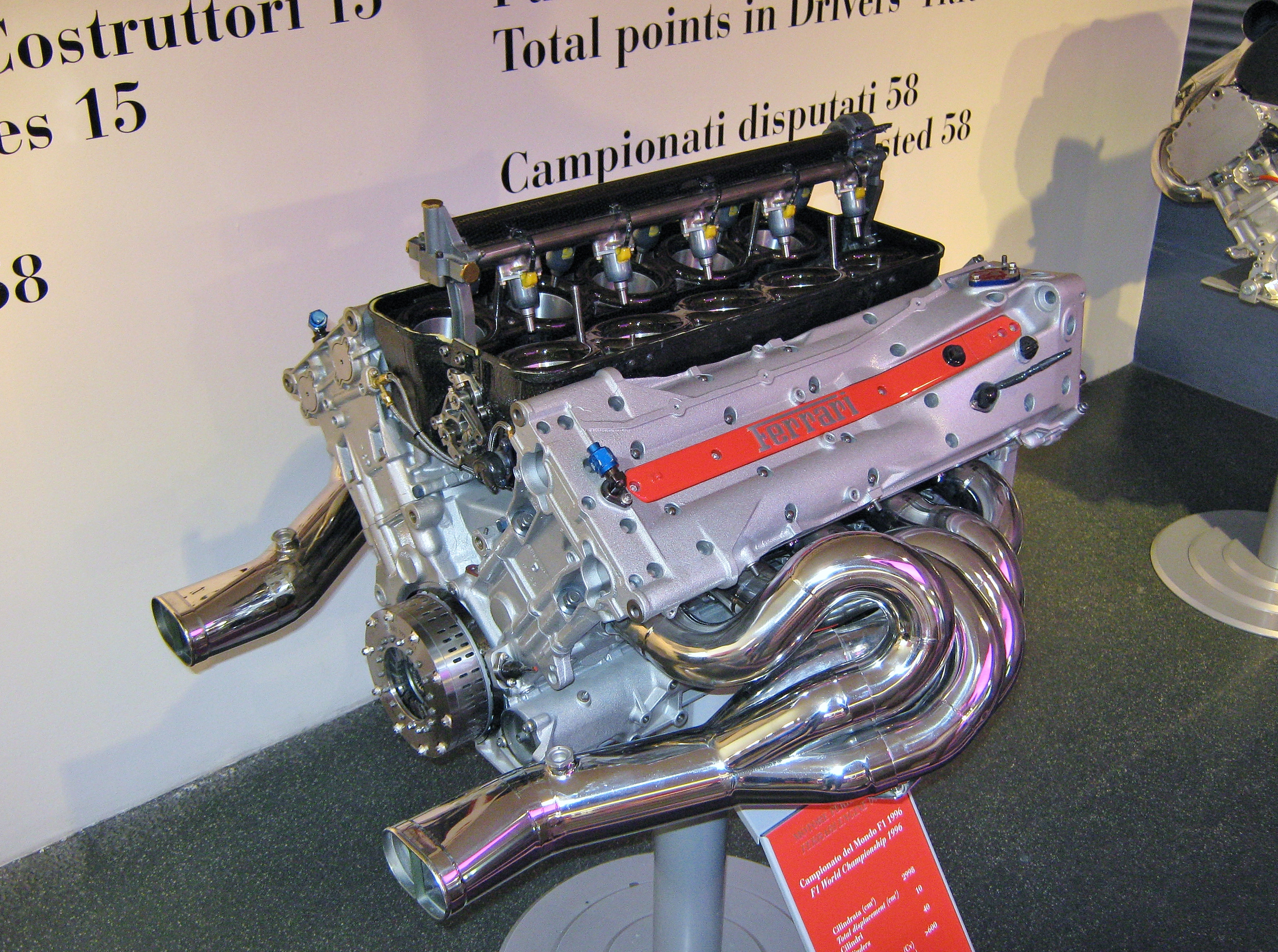
Ferrari V10 engine showing one of its two tuned extractor manifolds

In an internal combustion engine, the geometry of the exhaust system can be optimised ("tuned") to maximise the power output of the engine. Tuned exhausts are designed so that reflected pressure waves arrive at the exhaust port at a particular time in the combustion cycle.

== Two-stroke engines ==
=== Expansion chambers ===
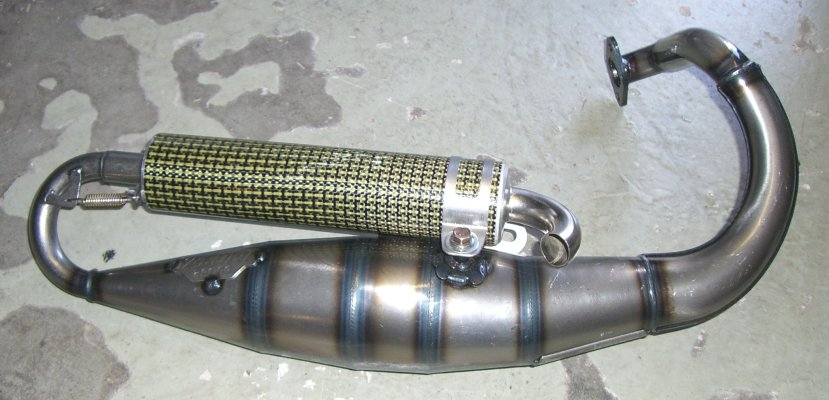
Exhaust system for a motor scooter with an expansion chamber in the middle section (inlet is shown at the top right of the picture and muffler/outlet is above the expansion chamber).

In two-stroke engines where the exhaust port is opened by being uncovered by the piston (rather than by a separate valve), a tuned exhaust system usually consists of an expansion chamber. The expansion chamber is designed to produce a negative pressure wave to assist in filling the cylinder with the next intake charge, and then to produce a positive pressure wave which reduces the amount of fresh intake charge that escapes through the exhaust port (port blocking).

=== Uniflow scavenging ===
An alternate design of two-stroke engines is where the exhaust port is opened/closed using a poppet valve and the intake port is piston-controlled (opened by being uncovered by the piston). The timing of the exhaust valve closure is designed to assist in filling the cylinder with the next intake charge (as per four-stroke engines).

An opposed-piston engine uses uniflow scavenging, however this design uses piston-controlled cylinder ports with one piston controlling the inlet port and the other the exhaust port. Similarly, split-single engines use uniflow scavenging, with the piston in one cylinder controlling the transfer port (where the intake mixture enters the cylinder) and the other piston controls the exhaust port.

== Four-stroke engines ==
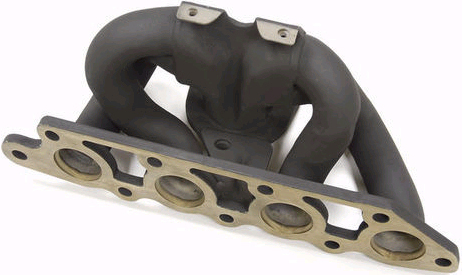
Aftermarket extractor manifold

In a four-stroke engine, an exhaust manifold which is designed to maximise the power output of an engine is often called "extractors" or "headers". The pipe lengths and merging locations are designed to assist in filling the cylinder with the next intake charge using exhaust scavenging. Locations where exhaust pipes from individual cylinders merge are called "collectors". The diameters of the exhaust system are designed to minimise back-pressure by optimising the gas velocity.

Extractors/headers usually have equal length pipes for each cylinder, whereas a more basic exhaust manifold may have unequal length pipes.

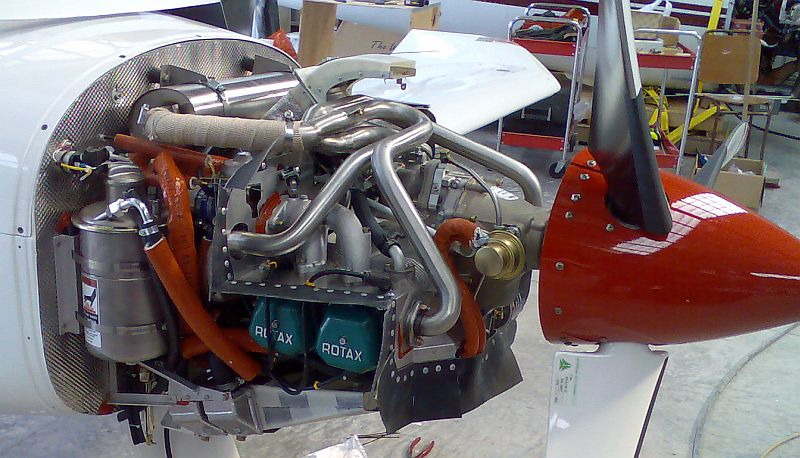
Exhaust system for a Rotax 912s airplane engine

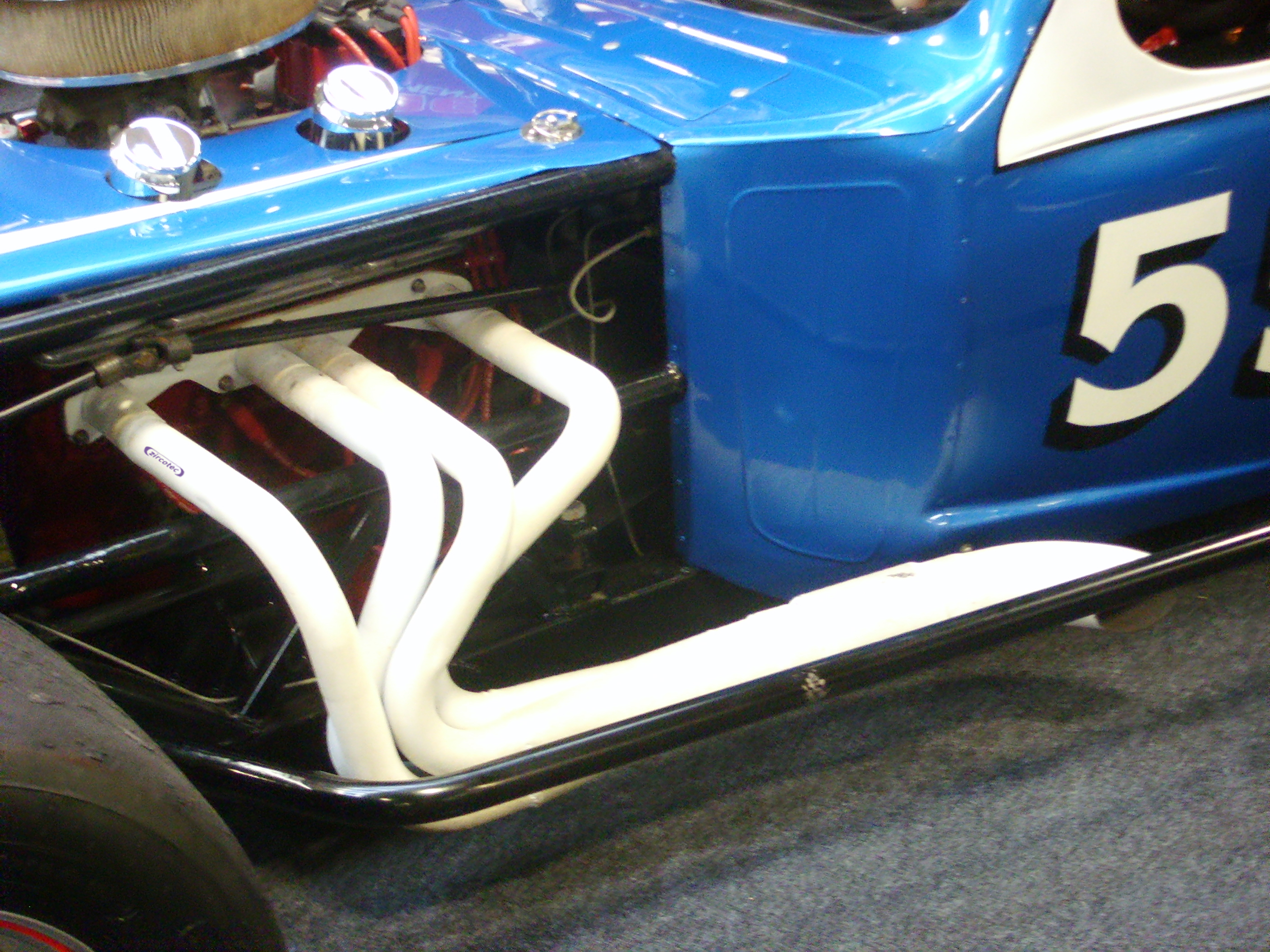
Long tube headers (in white) on a racing car

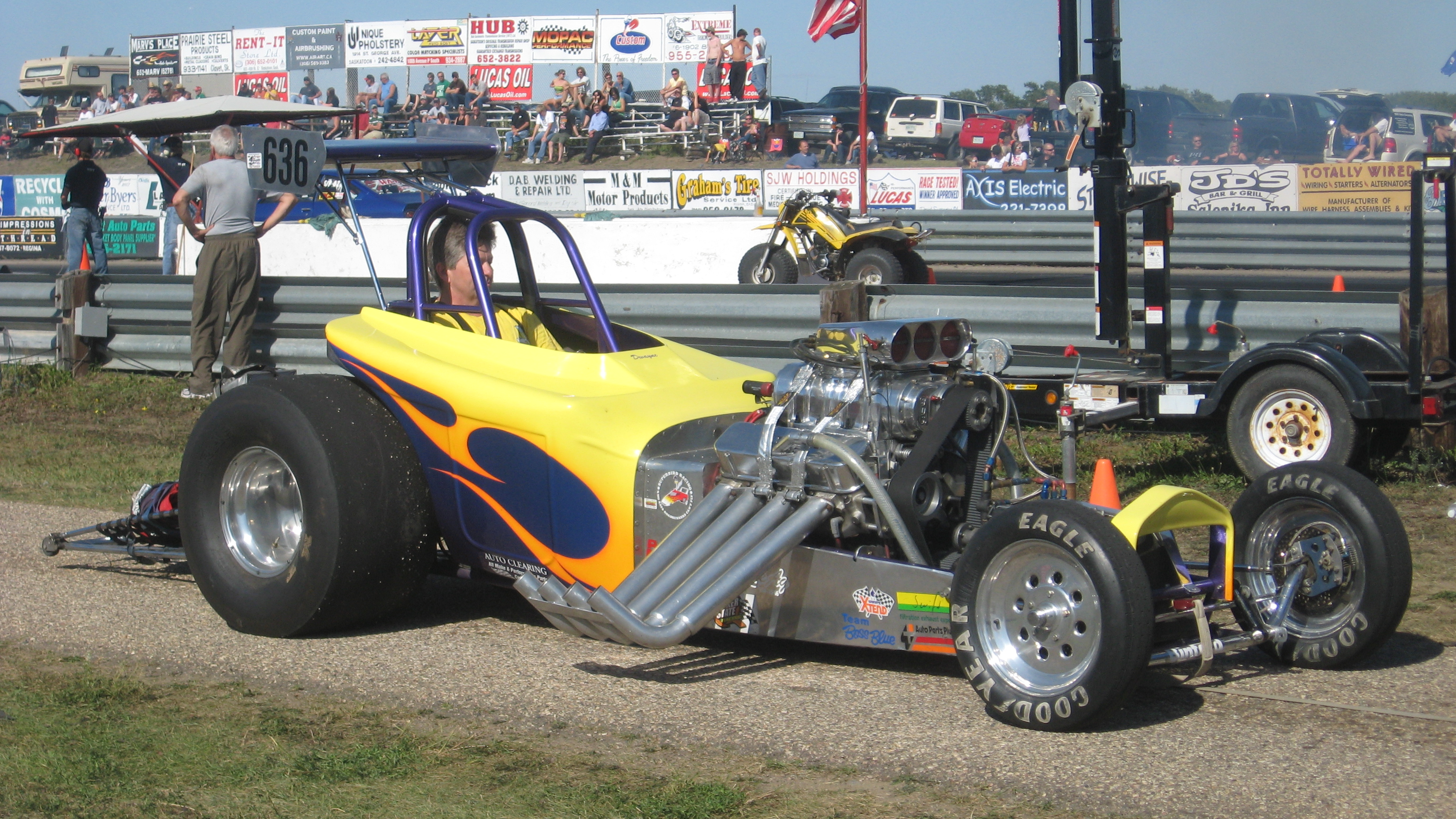
"Zoomie" headers on a dragster

== 4-2-1 exhausts ==
A 4-2-1 exhaust system is a type of exhaust manifold for an engine with four cylinders per bank, such as an inline-four engine or a V8 engine. The layout of a 4-2-1 system is as follows: four pipes (primary) come off the cylinder head, and merge into two pipes (secondary), which in turn finally link up to form one collector pipe.

Compared with a 4-1 exhaust system, a 4-2-1 often produces more power at mid-range engine speeds (RPM), while a 4-1 exhaust produces more power at high RPM.

=== Cylinder pairings ===
The purpose of a 4-2-1 exhaust system is to increase scavenging by merging the exhaust paths of specific pairs of cylinders. Therefore, the cylinder pairings are defined by the intervals between firing events, which is determined by the firing order and— for engines with an unevenly spaced firing order— the firing interval.

For an inline-four engine with a typical firing order of 1-3-4-2, pairing cylinders 1 & 4 and cylinders 2 & 3 is considered "non-sequential", since the paired cylinders do not follow each other in the firing order. This non-sequential arrangement results in an even spacing of 360 degrees between the firing interval in each cylinder pair. A sequential pairing would result in uneven spacings, such as 180 degrees and 540 degrees for pairings of cylinders 1 & 2 and 3 & 4. This sequential pairing is used by many motorcycle engines.

For a V8 engine with a typical crossplane design, 4-2-1 exhausts are often called "Tri-Y" exhausts. Traditionally, only cylinders within the same bank were paired, resulting in spacings of 90-630 degrees (sequential), 180-540 degrees or 270-450 degrees. Typically, the 270 interval is favoured, requiring different pairings in each bank; e.g. 1 & 2 and 3 & 4 in one bank, but 1 & 3 and 2 & 4 in the other. Naturally, such exhausts are sensitive to the specific firing order in use. Even spacings of 360-360 degrees are only possible if a cross-over exhaust manifold is used to pair cylinders from separate banks.

=== Pipe lengths ===
The combining of exhaust pressure pulses from each cylinder dictates the lengths of the pipes necessary. Generally, shorter pipes will help produce more power at higher engine rpm, and longer pipes favour low-rpm torque, thereby altering the power band. However, the gases tend to cool as they pass through longer pipes, which reduces the effectiveness of the catalytic converter.

In a turbocharged engine, the key factor in the length of the exhaust pipes is providing evenly-spaced pressure pulses to the turbine of the turbocharger.

== See also ==
Two-stroke engines

- Expansion chamber
- Exhaust pulse pressure charging
- Kadenacy effect

Four-stroke engines

- Exhaust system
- Exhaust manifold
- Scavenging (engine)
- Pressure wave supercharger
