= Inertial supercharging effect =

The inertial supercharging effect is the increase of volumetric efficiency in the cylinder of an engine.

== Background ==
The internal combustion engine is a very common engine found in mechanical devices across the world. The engine is powered by an air/gasoline mixture and the physics principles of heat and pressure.

== Overview ==
Inertial supercharging effect is the result of incoming fuel/air charge developing momentum greater than intake stroke would generate alone. It is achieved by the careful design of the shape of the piston head, the valves and cam profile/valve timing which creates a vacuum that pulls more exhaust gases (and some of the intake gasses) out of the engine. This is immediately followed by a reflected pressure wave timed to force the extra intake gasses back into the cylinder, thus achieving a greater mass of air/fuel mix in the combustion chamber than possible with conventional methods. Expansion chambers only work well at a narrow engine speed range which is why two stroke engines are referred to as having a "powerband". Since the early 1980s exhaust power valves have been developed which have the effect of altering the timing and/or volume of the expansion chamber, greatly improving the spread of power of high output two stroke engines.

The idea behind this effect is that if more pressure is created within the cylinder, the faster the piston will be able to move. The volumetric efficiency is maximized to increase the amount of air/fuel mixture in the cylinder during each cycle. In turn, a greater air/fuel mixture in a cylinder will create a greater pressure therefore exerting a greater force on the piston. This increased force on each individual piston increases the potential horsepower of the entire engine. The timing of the opening and closing of the valves is essential to ensure the air in the cylinder is maximized to create the most power in each cycle.

== See also ==
- Exhaust pulse pressure charging
- Kadenacy effect
- Pressure wave supercharger
- Supercharger
