= Crossley =

British internal combustion engine manufacturer

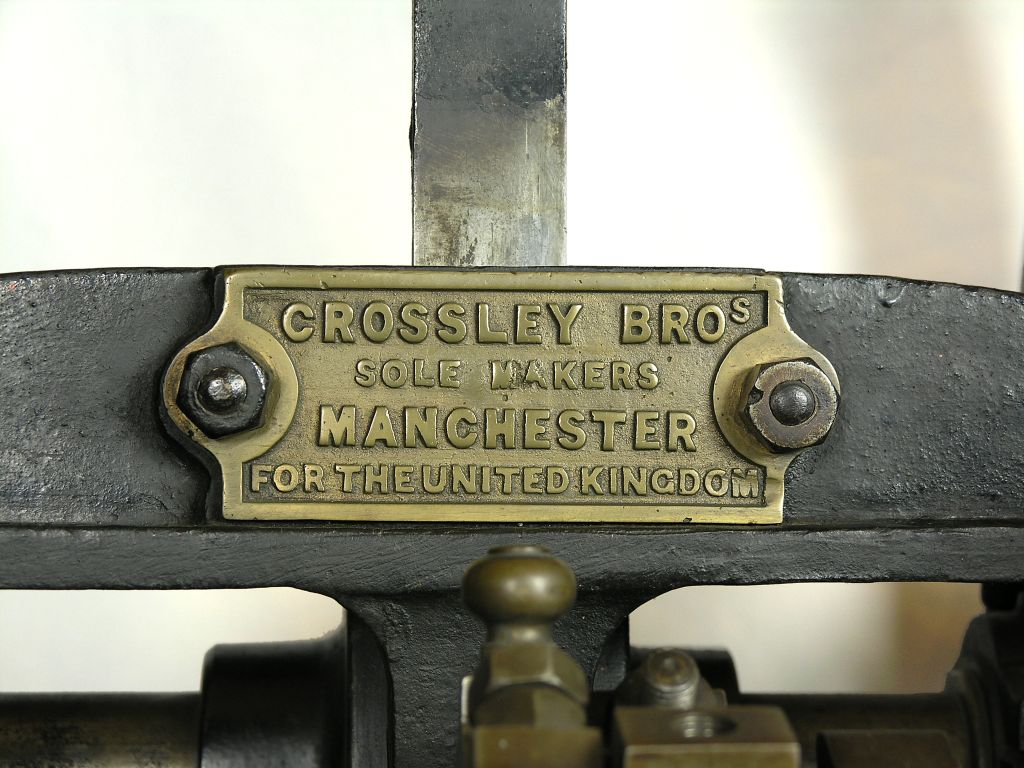
Maker's plate, on an atmospheric gas engine at Thinktank, Birmingham Science Museum

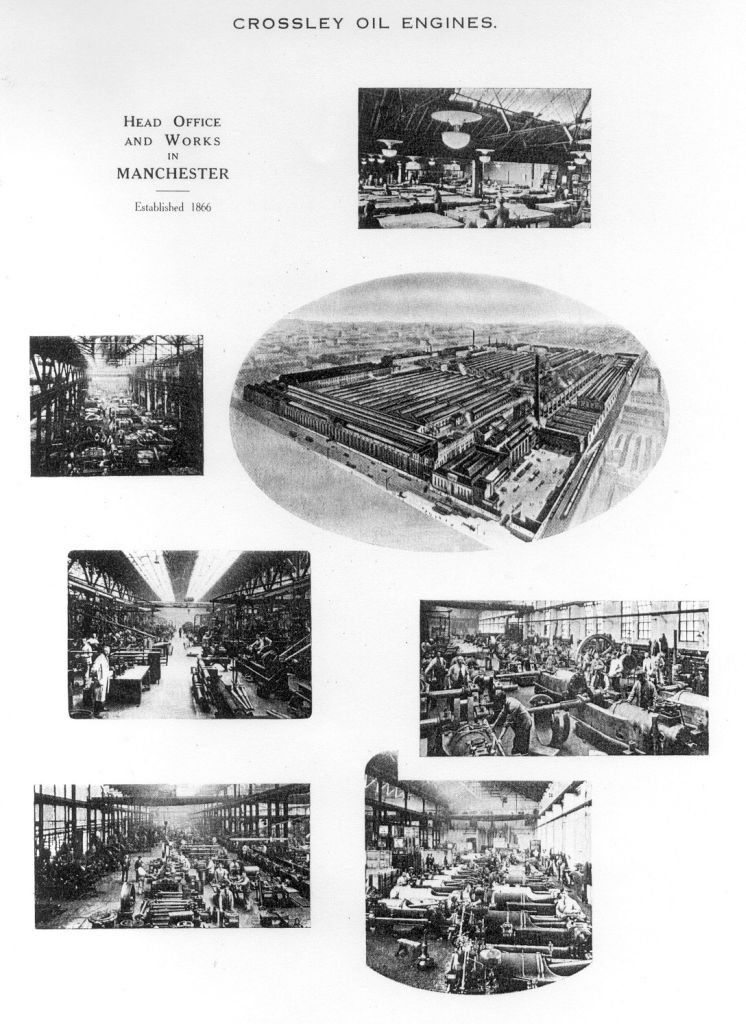
Undated advertisement

Crossley, based in Manchester, England, was a pioneering company in the production of internal combustion engines. Since 1989, it has been part of the Rolls-Royce Power Engineering group.

More than 100,000 Crossley oil and gas engines have been built.

== History ==
=== Crossley Brothers ===
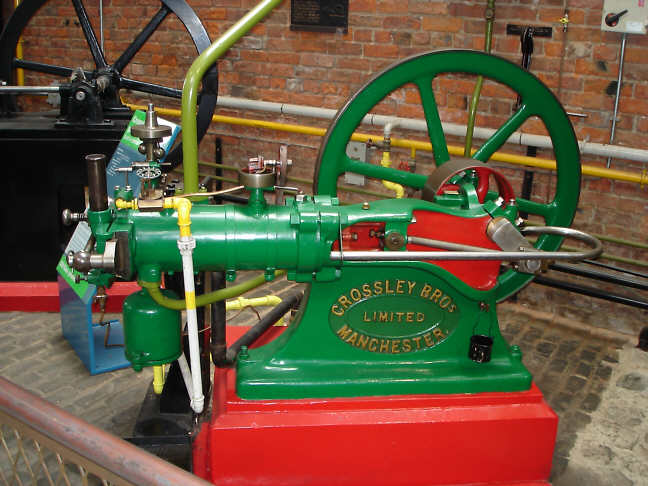
A Crossley 1/2hp engine from 1884

Crossley Brothers was set up in 1867 by brothers Francis (1839–97) and William J.(1844–1911). Francis, with help from his uncle, bought the engineering business of John M Dunlop at Great Marlborough Street in Manchester city centre, including manufacturing pumps, presses, and small steam engines. William (Sir William from 1910 – Baronet) joined his brother shortly after the purchase. The company name was initially changed to Crossley Brothers and Dunlop. Each of the brothers had served engineering apprenticeships: Francis, known as Frank, at Robert Stephenson and Company; and William at W.G. Armstrong, both in Newcastle upon Tyne. William concentrated on the business side, Frank provided the engineering expertise.

The brothers were committed Christians and strictly teetotal, refusing to supply their products to companies such as breweries, whom they did not approve of. They adopted the early Christian symbol of the Coptic cross as the emblem to use on their road vehicles.

In 1869 they had the foresight to acquire the UK and world (except German) rights to the patents of Otto and Langden of Cologne for the new gas fueled atmospheric internal combustion engine and in 1876 these rights were extended to the famous Otto four-stroke cycle engine. The changeover to four stroke engines was remarkably rapid with the last atmospheric engines being made in 1877.

The business flourished. In 1881, Crossley Brothers became a private limited company (i.e. Crossley Brothers Ltd.), and then in 1882 it moved to larger premises in Pottery Lane, Openshaw, in eastern Manchester.

Further technical improvements also followed, including the introduction of poppet valves and the hot-tube ignitor in 1888 and the introduction of the carburettor, allowing volatile liquid fuels to be used.

By adopting the heavier fuelled "oil" engine, the first one being demonstrated in 1891, the company's future was assured. Among other applications, these "oil" engines were used with Gwynnes Centrifugal Pumps for irrigation. Then in 1896, they obtained rights to the diesel system, which used the heat of compression alone to ignite the fuel. Their first diesel was built in 1898.

Engines on display at the Science and Industry Museum in Manchester include:

- Diesel
- Oil
- Gas

By the turn of the century, there was also some production of petrol engines, and from 1901 these engines were finding their way into road vehicles, including, in 1905, Leyland buses.

A major contribution to manufacturing was the introduction of the assembly line. The Crossley system even influenced Henry Ford, who visited Pottery Lane at the turn of the century.

=== Crossley Motors ===
In 1904, the company started production of motor cars and a separate company, Crossley Motors Ltd. was registered on 11 April 1906.

This company was sold to Associated Equipment Company (AEC) in 1948, and vehicle production continued until 1958.

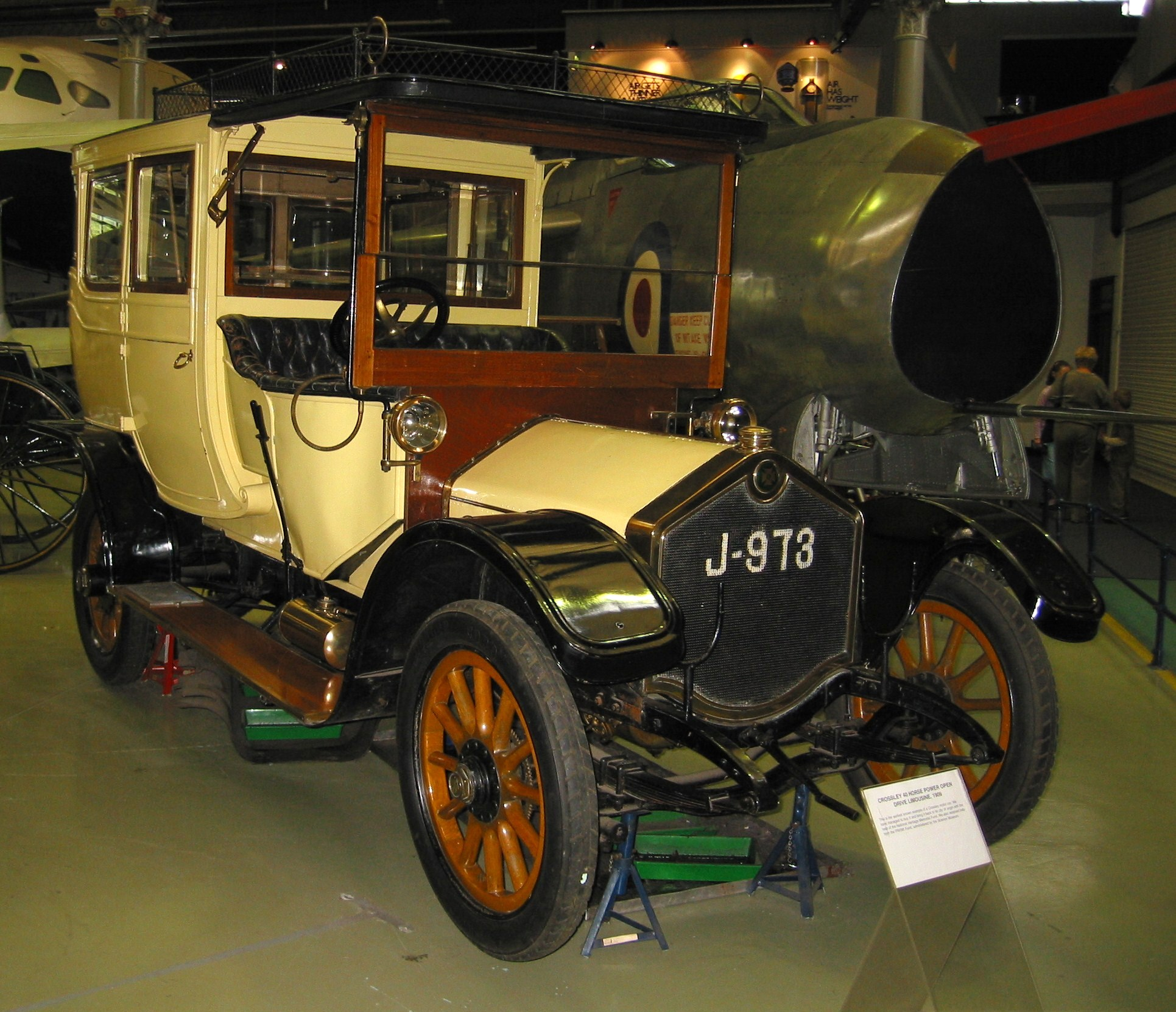
1909 Crossley 40 hp designed by J. S. Critchley

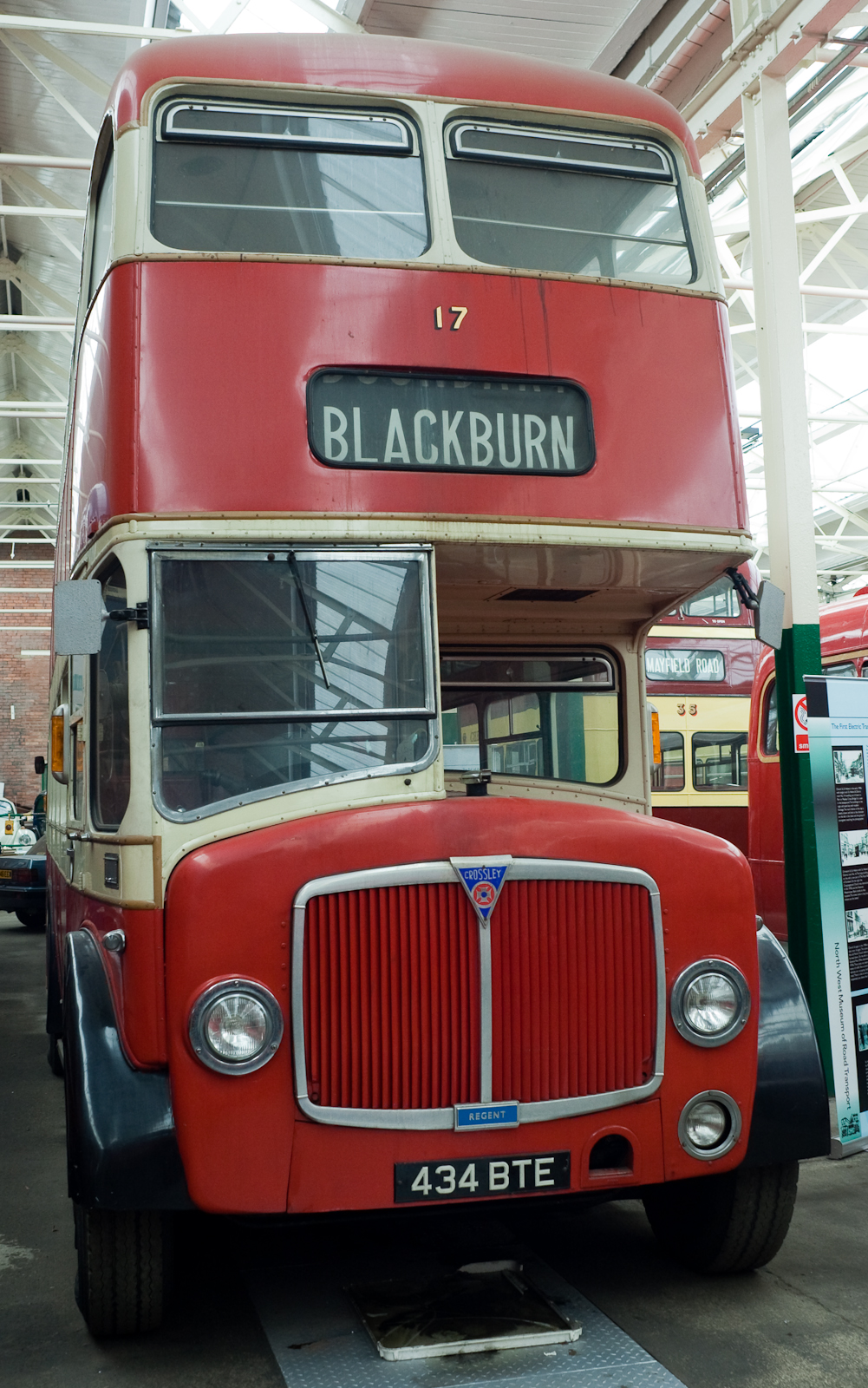
An AEC Regent V badge-engineered into a Crossley Regent bus after AEC absorbed Crossley Motors

=== Crossley Premier ===
In 1919, Crossley Brothers bought Premier Gas Engines of Sandiacre, Derbyshire, who built very large engines, and in 1935, changed their name to Crossley Premier Engines Ltd. The Sandiacre factory was expanded, and production continued there until 1966.

The engines were large horizontal heavy oil engines, typically used as generating plants or to power industrial plant such as air compressors, water pumps or mills. They were produced in a range of sizes, based on a standard cylinder unit, as either in-line or horizontally opposed cylinder engines. They had (side valve) clerestory combustion chambers with single inlet and exhaust valves above and below the chamber. Other manufacturers at the time, notably Brush, produced very similar engines as modular, opposed cylinder units. Crossley's were distinctive for using a monobloc head on each cylinder, although this was in the form of a self-supporting wet liner and the water jacket around the whole cylinder bank was a separate casting. The engines were also unusual for being one of the few practical applications of an electrically driven supercharger. This gave a relatively low boost pressure and was more of a scavenge blower, but it could increase output power by up to 50%.

A pair of 16-cylinder opposed engines of 3,500 bhp, built for electrical generation in Jerusalem in the 1930s, were at the time the largest oil engines in the world. Like the earlier Ferranti steam generating plants, these placed half of the engine each side of a centrally mounted alternator, thus reducing the maximum load on the crankshaft. A similar engine in a bombproof underground shelter was used to power the wartime Aspidistra transmitter.

By the 1960s, although sales remained reasonable, the company had become unprofitable. The design of the engines then being made was essentially 40 years old, so in 1962 an agreement was reached to use the French Pielstick design. Production of these engines, intended for ships, railway locomotives and electricity generation, was initially carried out at Sandiacre. But, before the engines could become established, the money ran out and the company had to call in the receivers. A purchaser was found in Belliss and Morcom Ltd. but the name Crossley-Premier was kept.

The market for engines was continuing to shrink, and in 1968 the new company joined the Amalgamated Power Engineering (APE) group and the name became APE-Crossley Ltd. For the first time the new company used the Coptic Cross logo on the engines. Previously, this had only appeared on Crossley Motors products — the rights to use it had to be bought from British Leyland. APE, in turn, became part of Northern Engineering Industries (NEI) in 1981, and the company name became NEI-Allen Limited – Crossley Engines.

=== Rolls-Royce Power Engineering ===
NEI themselves, in 1989, merged with Rolls-Royce plc, and the company became part of the Allen Power Engineering – Crossley Engines division of the Rolls-Royce Industrial Power Group. This later became the Crossley Engines division of Rolls-Royce Power Engineering and continued to produce the Crossley-Pielstick range until 1995.

The Crossley Works on Pottery Lane was closed on 27 February 2009, with what remains of the business being relocated to a Rolls-Royce factory in Dunfermline. Demolition of the works began in December 2009.

== Diesel engines ==
Crossley Brothers built diesel engines for stationary, marine and locomotive use. There was a wide range of engines from six to 3200 horsepower (Crossley) and up to 9000 horsepower (Crossley-Pielstick).

Their marine engines had a reputation for durability and reliability. However, their rush to be a part of the emerging railway traction market was an unmitigated disaster.

Crossley apparently took one of its successful World War II Patrol Boat motors and re-engineered it for railway service. This resulted in the construction of;

- the HSTVee-8, used in the British Rail Class 28, the CIE 001 Class and the WAGR X class
- the KLCKee-25 used in the KLC 123 Class
- the ESTVee-8 used in the CIE 201 Class
- the ESNT6 used in British Rail Class D3/3 shunting locomotives

All were two stroke engines equipped with Crossley's system of exhaust pulse pressure charging whereby surplus air in the exhaust manifold was forced back into the cylinder by the exhaust pulse from a neighbouring cylinder.

Crossley's foray into rail motive power construction was disastrous, with all but those installed in the WAGR X class having a very short working life. Motor failures occurred within months of the various classes being introduced. The WAGR Crossleys underwent over 600 modifications in their service life. The CIE 001 Class were re-motored with EMD engines between 1968 and 1971 and the CIE 201 Class between 1969 and 1972.

== Patents ==
Crossley Brothers obtained numerous patents for improvements to internal combustion engines. One example is a waste heat recovery unit, British patent no. 305 of 1915.

== See also ==
- Crossley Motors
- Gas engine
- Diesel engine
