= James S. Critchley =

English mechanical engineer (1865–1944)

James Sidney Critchley
- Born: 1865; Dewsbury
- Died: 1944 (aged 78–79); Bickley
- Occupations: Engineer, designer
- Spouse: Annie (m. 1897)

James Sidney Critchley (1865–1944) was an English mechanical engineer, car designer and automotive pioneer.

Critchley was born in Dewsbury, England in 1865 to William and Sarah and educated at Bradford Grammar School. He served apprenticeship articles with J. Waugh, of Bradford and Thomas Green and Sons, Leeds, makers of tram locomotives, and went on to specialise in the design and construction of industrial machinery.

In 1896, he was interviewed by Frederick Richard Simms and was appointed as Works manager to the Daimler Company at the Coventry Motor Mills. He was described as "one of the few men in England with a practical knowledge of motor engineering". In May, 1898 he drove the Prince of Wales on his first motor journey on English roads taking him from Warwick Castle to Compton Verney and Wellesbourne. In around 1898 he was promoted to General Manager.

He left Daimler in 1901 and joined the Brush Electrical Engineering Company, Limited who were experimenting with car production in their Lambeth works in London.

He was a founder member of the Royal Automobile Club and in 1902 Critchley and Simms founded the Society of Motor Manufacturers and Traders.

In 1903, Crossley Brothers decided to go into car production and asked Critchley to design them a car. This car, the 22 hp was introduced in 1904 followed in 1906 by the 40 hp. After this design was finalised he left Crossley and set up his own business as a design Consultant with offices at Chancery Lane and then Tottenham Court Road in London.

He was president of the Institution of Automobile Engineers in 1913-15. During World War I he became chief inspector of motor transport with the rank of captain. When the war ended, he returned to his engineering consultancy.

Critchley died in 1944 at Bickley, Kent at the age of 79.

== Personal life ==
Critchley married Annie in 1897.
