= Back pressure =

Force opposing the flow of fluid through pipes

Back pressure (or backpressure) is the term for a resistance to the desired flow of fluid through pipes. Obstructions or tight bends create backpressure via friction loss and pressure drop.

In distributed systems in particular event-driven architecture, back pressure is a technique to regulate flow of data, ensuring that components do not become overwhelmed.

== Explanation ==
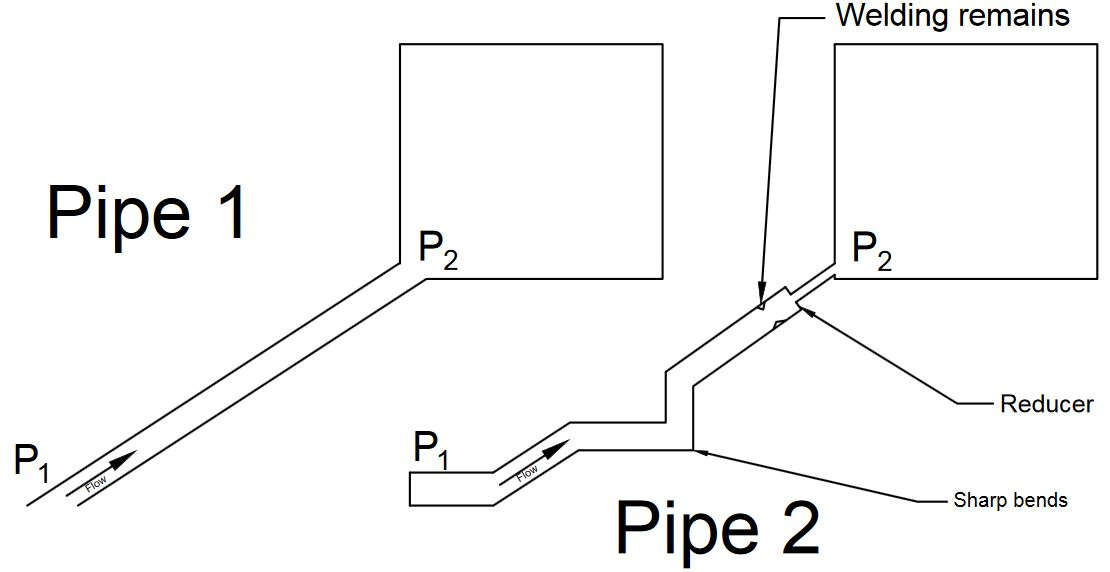
Two similar pipings with same pressure distance and head. The second pipe contains some obstructions for flow resulting in less discharge.

A common example of backpressure is that caused by the exhaust system (consisting of the exhaust manifold, catalytic converter, muffler and connecting pipes) of an automotive four-stroke engine, which has a negative effect on engine efficiency, resulting in a decrease of power output that must be compensated by increasing fuel consumption.

In a piston-ported two-stroke engine, however, the situation is more complicated, due to the need to prevent unburned fuel/air mixture from passing right through the cylinders into the exhaust. During the exhaust phase of the cycle, backpressure is even more undesirable than in a four-stroke engine, as there is less time available for exhaust and the lack of pumping action from the piston to force the exhaust out of the cylinder. However, since the exhaust port necessarily remains open for a time after scavenging is completed, unburned mixture can follow the exhaust out of the cylinder, wasting fuel and increasing pollution. This can only be prevented if the pressure at the exhaust port is greater than that in the cylinder. Since the timing of this process is determined mainly by exhaust system geometry, which is extremely difficult to make variable, correct timing and therefore optimum engine efficiency can typically only be achieved over a small part of the engine's range of operating speed.

== Liquid chromatography ==
Back pressure is the term used for the hydraulic pressure required to create a flow through a chromatography column in high-performance liquid chromatography, the term deriving from the fact that it is generated by the resistance of the column, and exerts its influence backwards on the pump that must supply the flow. Back-pressure is a useful diagnostic feature of problems with the chromatography column. Rapid chromatography is favoured by columns packed with very small particles, which create high back-pressures. Column designers use "kinetic plots" to show the performance of a column at a constant back-pressure, usually selected as the maximum that a system's pump can reliably produce.

== See also ==
- Exhaust pulse pressure charging
- Expansion chamber
- Scalar quantity
