= Exhaust manifold =

Structure collecting an engine's exhaust outlets

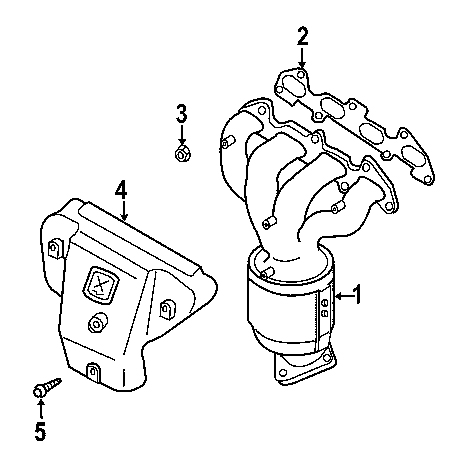
Diagram of an exhaust manifold from a Kia Rio. 1. manifold; 2. gasket; 3. nut; 4. heat shield; 5. heat shield bolt

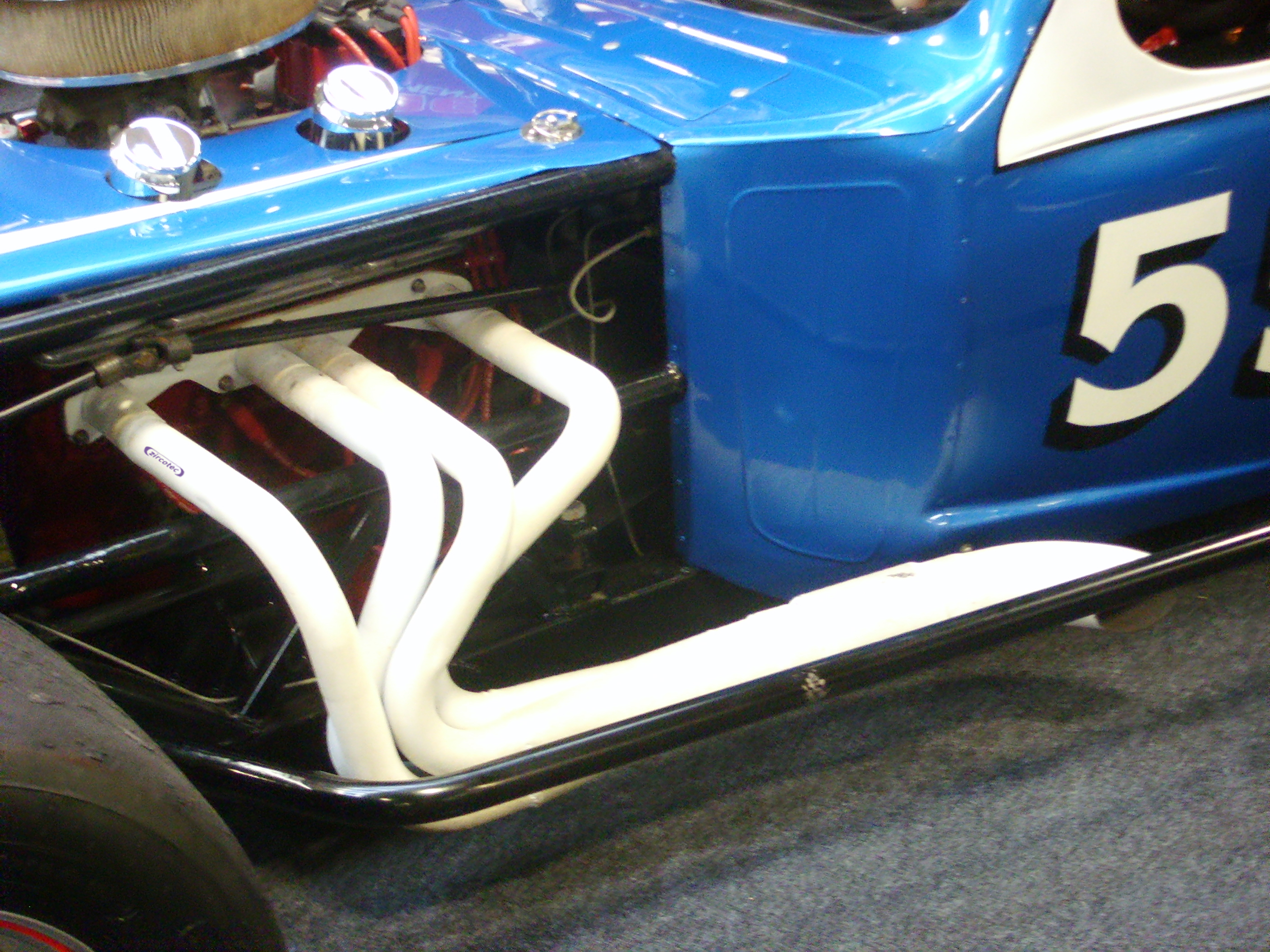
Ceramic-coated exhaust manifold on the side of a performance car

In automotive engineering, an exhaust manifold collects the exhaust gases from multiple cylinders into one pipe. The word manifold comes from the Old English word manigfeald (from the Anglo-Saxon manig [many] and feald [fold]) and refers to the folding together of multiple inputs and outputs (in contrast, an inlet or intake manifold supplies air to the cylinders).

Exhaust manifolds are generally simple cast iron or stainless steel units that collect engine exhaust gas from multiple cylinders and deliver it to the exhaust pipe. For many engines, there are aftermarket tubular exhaust manifolds known as headers in American English, as extractor manifolds in British and Australian English, and simply as "tubular manifolds" in British English. These consist of individual exhaust headpipes for each cylinder, which then usually converge into one tube called a collector. Headers that do not have collectors are called zoomie headers.

The most common types of aftermarket headers are made of mild steel or stainless steel tubing for the primary tubes along with flat flanges and possibly a larger diameter collector made of a similar material as the primaries. They may be coated with a ceramic-type finish (sometimes both inside and outside), or painted with a heat-resistant finish, or bare. Chrome-plated headers are available, but these tend to blue after use. Polished stainless steel will also color (usually a yellow tint), but less than chrome in most cases.

Another form of modification used is to insulate a standard or aftermarket manifold. This decreases the amount of heat given off into the engine bay, therefore reducing the intake manifold temperature. There are a few types of thermal insulation but three are particularly common:

- Ceramic paint is sprayed or brushed onto the manifold and then cured in an oven. These are usually thin, so they have little insulatory properties; however, they reduce engine bay heating by lessening the heat output via radiation.
- A ceramic mixture is bonded to the manifold via thermal spraying to give a tough ceramic coating with very good thermal insulation. This is often used on performance production cars and track-only racers.
- Exhaust wrap is wrapped completely around the manifold. Although this is cheap and fairly simple, it can lead to premature degradation of the manifold.

The goal of performance exhaust headers is mainly to decrease flow resistance (back pressure), and to increase the volumetric efficiency of an engine, resulting in a gain in power output. The processes occurring can be explained by the gas laws, specifically the ideal gas law and the combined gas law.

== Exhaust scavenging ==
Cut through a 2-1 junction in an exhaust manifold showing pressure, which is nonhomogeneous due to centripetal forces, and flow.

When an engine starts its exhaust stroke, the piston moves up the cylinder bore, decreasing the total chamber volume. When the exhaust valve opens, the high-pressure exhaust gas escapes into the exhaust manifold or header, creating an "exhaust pulse" comprising three main parts:

1. The high-pressure head is created by the large pressure difference between the exhaust in the combustion chamber and the atmospheric pressure outside of the exhaust system
2. As the exhaust gases equalize between the combustion chamber and the atmosphere, the difference in pressure decreases and the exhaust velocity decreases. This forms the medium-pressure body component of the exhaust pulse.
3. The remaining exhaust gas forms the low-pressure tail component. This tail component may initially match ambient atmospheric pressure, but the momentum of the high and medium-pressure components reduces the pressure in the combustion chamber to a lower-than-atmospheric level.

This relatively low pressure helps to extract all the combustion products from the cylinder and induct the intake charge during the overlap period when both intake and exhaust valves are partially open. The effect is known as "scavenging". Length, cross-sectional area, and shaping of the exhaust ports and pipeworks influences the degree of scavenging effect and the engine speed range over which scavenging occurs.

The magnitude of the exhaust scavenging effect is a direct function of the velocity of the high and medium pressure components of the exhaust pulse. Performance headers work to increase the exhaust velocity as much as possible. One technique is tuned-length primary tubes. This technique attempts to time the occurrence of each exhaust pulse to occur one after the other in succession while still in the exhaust system. The lower pressure tail of an exhaust pulse then serves to create a greater pressure difference between the high-pressure head of the next exhaust pulse, thus increasing the velocity of that exhaust pulse. In V6 and V8 engines where there is more than one exhaust bank, "Y-pipes" and "X-pipes" work on the same principle of using the low-pressure component of an exhaust pulse to increase the velocity of the next exhaust pulse.

Great care must be used when selecting the length and diameter of the primary tubes. Tubes that are too large will cause the exhaust gas to expand and slow down, decreasing the scavenging effect. Tubes that are too small will create exhaust flow resistance, which the engine must work to expel the exhaust gas from the chamber, reducing power and leaving exhaust in the chamber to dilute the incoming intake charge. Since engines produce more exhaust gas at higher speeds, the header(s) are tuned to a particular engine speed range according to the intended application. Typically, wide primary tubes offer the best gains in power and torque at higher engine speeds, while narrow tubes offer the best gains at lower speeds.

Many headers are also resonance tuned, to utilize the low-pressure reflected wave rarefaction pulse which can help scavenging the combustion chamber during valve overlap. This pulse is created in all exhaust systems each time a change in density occurs, such as when exhaust merges into the collector. For clarification, the rarefaction pulse is the technical term for the same process that was described above in the "head, body, tail" description. By tuning the length of the primary tubes, usually by means of resonance tuning, the rarefaction pulse can be timed to coincide with the exact moment valve overlap occurs. Typically, long primary tubes resonate at a lower engine speed than short primary tubes.

== H/X exhaust pipes in cross-plane V8s ==
Crossplane V8 engines have a left and right bank, each containing 4 cylinders. When the engine is running, pistons are firing according to the engine firing order. If a bank has two consecutive piston firings, it will create a high-pressure area in the exhaust pipe because two exhaust pulses are moving through it close in time. As the two pulses move in the exhaust pipe, they should encounter either an X or H pipe. When they encounter the pipe, part of the pulse diverts into the X-H pipe, which lowers the total pressure by a small amount. The reason for this decrease in pressure is that the fluid (liquid, air, or gas) will travel along a pipe, and when it comes to a crossing, the fluid will take the path of least resistance. Some will bleed off, thus lowering the pressure slightly. Without an X-H pipe, the flow of exhaust would be jerky or inconsistent, and the engine would not run at its highest efficiency. The double exhaust pulse would cause part of the next exhaust pulse in that bank to not exit that cylinder completely and cause either a detonation (because of a lean air–fuel ratio (AFR)) or a misfire due to a rich AFR. This depends on how much of the double pulse was left and what the mixture of that pulse was.

== Dynamic exhaust geometry ==
Today's understanding of exhaust systems and fluid dynamics has given rise to a number of mechanical improvements. One such improvement can be seen in the exhaust ultimate power valve ("EXUP") fitted to some Yamaha motorcycles. It constantly adjusts the back pressure within the collector of the exhaust system to enhance pressure wave formation as a function of engine speed. This ensures good low- to mid-range performance.

At low engine speeds, the wave pressure within the pipe network is low. A full oscillation of the Helmholtz resonance occurs before the exhaust valve is closed, and to increase low-speed torque, large amplitude exhaust pressure waves are artificially induced. This is achieved by partial closing of an internal valve within the exhaust—the EXUP valve—at the point where the four primary pipes from the cylinders join. This junction point essentially behaves as an artificial atmosphere; hence, the alteration of the pressure at this point controls the behavior of reflected waves at this sudden increase in area discontinuity. Closing the valve increases the local pressure, thus inducing the formation of larger amplitude negative reflected expansion waves. This enhances low-speed torque up to a speed at which the loss due to increased back pressure outweighs the EXUP tuning effect. At higher speeds the EXUP valve is fully opened and the exhaust is allowed to flow freely.

== See also ==
- Cylinder head porting
- Fusible core injection molding
- Tuned exhaust
- Thermal spraying
- Exhaust heat management
- Thermal barrier coating
- Zircotec
