= Exhaust pulse pressure charging =

Exhaust pulse pressure charging (EPPC) is a system for supercharging two-stroke diesel engines of the loop-scavenge type. Loop-scavenge engines cannot be pressure-charged in the same way as uniflow engines or four-stroke engines because the inlet and exhaust ports are open at the same time.

== Overview ==
The engine usually has a Roots blower to provide air for scavenging and this is arranged to deliver excess air so that air follows the exhaust gases into the exhaust manifold. Some of this air is then forced back into the cylinder by a rise in pressure in the exhaust manifold resulting from the exhaust pulse from another cylinder.

For additional pressure charging a turbocharger may be fitted, in series with the Roots blower, but a turbocharger cannot be used alone as it would not provide enough air for scavenging at low speeds.

== Examples ==
Exhaust pulse pressure charging was used by Crossley in these diesel locomotive engines:

- the HST-Vee 8, used in the British Rail Class 28, the CIE 001 Class and the WAGR X class
- the EST-Vee 8 used in the CIE 201 Class
- the ESNT 6 used in British Rail Class D3/3 shunting locomotives

== See also ==
- Backpressure
- Inertial supercharging effect
- Kadenacy effect
- Pressure wave supercharger

== Sources ==
- R. L. Aston (1957). The Diesel Locomotive. London: Thames and Hudson. pp. 19, 22–24, 31.
