= Pressure wave supercharger =

Type of supercharger

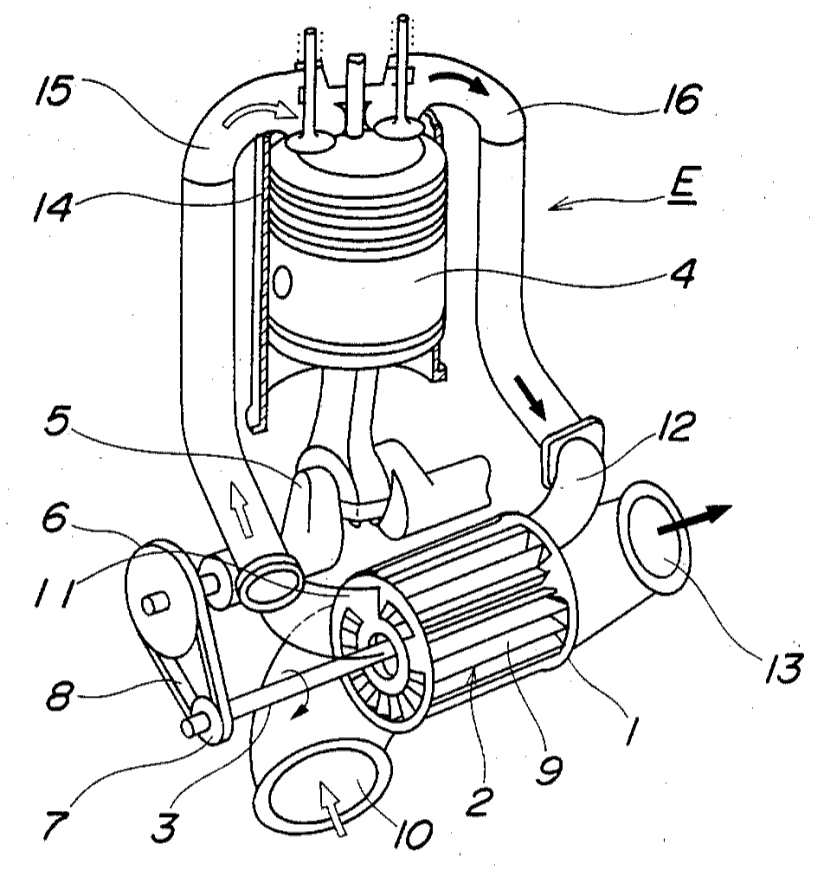
U.S. patent 4,563,997, Figure 1: Pressure wave supercharger

A pressure wave supercharger (also known as a wave rotor) is a type of supercharger technology that harnesses the pressure waves produced by an internal combustion engine exhaust gas pulses to compress the intake air. Its automotive use is not widespread; the most widely used example is the Comprex, developed by Brown Boveri.

== In automobiles ==
Valmet Tractors of Finland were one of the first to use the device when they fitted it to the 411CX engine which powered their 1203 model of 1980. Although it provided a useful increase in performance it was considered too expensive to be incorporated into later models. One of the first installations in a passenger car was in the Rinspeed Topaz Comprex, a Volkswagen Golf-based show car displayed at the 1982 Geneva Motor Show. Ferrari tested such a device during the development of the 126C Formula One car. The system did not lend itself to as tidy an installation as the alternative twin-turbocharger layout, and the car was never raced in this form. A more successful application was in the RF series diesel engine found in the 1988 Mazda 626 Capella; ultimately 150,000 Mazda diesel cars were fitted with a Comprex supercharger. Other users included Peugeot, Opel and Mercedes-Benz.

The Greenpeace SmILE concept car uses a Hyprex pressure wave supercharger developed by the Swiss company Wenko AG. NASA uses wave rotors in experiments attempting to increase gas turbine efficiency. The wave rotor is placed between the compressor, combustor, and turbine sections to extract more energy from the combustion process.

== Principle ==
The four cycles of operation of the pressure wave supercharger.

The process is controlled by a cylindrical cell rotor driven by the engine crankshaft via a belt or chain. Individual cells alternately open and close the exhaust gas and fresh air apertures. When the aperture on the exhaust gas side is reached, pressurized exhaust gas flows into the cell and compresses the fresh air there (diagram stage 2). As the cell rotor continues to rotate and reaches the aperture on the inlet side, the compressed air flows to the engine (3). Before the exhaust gas can flow, the aperture is closed again and the exhaust gas column is reflected before entering the engine (4). The exhaust gas exits at high speed, sucking further intake air into the cell behind it, repeating the process (1).

== Advantages ==
Energy exchange in the pressure-wave supercharger occurs at sonic velocity, resulting in good response even at low engine speeds, a common downfall of turbocharged engines. It combines the advantages of mechanical and exhaust gas supercharging, offering ample torque at lower engine speeds.

== Disadvantages ==
The Comprex system has two shortcomings. One, that the exhaust gases intermingle with the fresh air needed for combustion, leading to some recirculation of burnt gas. Secondly, this co-mingling also raises the temperature of the intake gas. Both of these are much less of a problem in a diesel than a petrol engine, hence the Comprex's rarity in petrol-engined applications.

== Control system ==
A control system to optimise performance was patented in 1986 by Hachiro Aoki for Diesel Kiki Co. Ltd., Tokyo, Japan - United States Patent 4563997.

== See also ==
- Exhaust pulse pressure charging
- Inertial supercharging effect
- Kadenacy effect
- Ferrari 126C
