= British Rail Class D3/3 =

Type and origin
- Power type: Diesel-electric
- Builder: British Railways’ Derby Works
- Build date: 1955
- Total produced: 10
Specifications
- Configuration
  - Whyte: 0-6-0 DE
  - UIC: C
- Gauge: 4 ft 8 1/2 in (1,435 mm) standard gauge
- Wheel diameter: 4 ft 6 in (1.372 m)
- Loco weight: 47.50 long tons (48.26 t; 53.20 short tons)
- Prime mover: Crossley ESNT 6
- Traction motors: Crompton Parkinson, 2 off
- MU working: Not fitted
- Train heating: None
- Train brakes: Vacuum
Performance figures
- Maximum speed: 20 mph (32 km/h)
- Power output: Engine: 350 bhp (261 kW)
- Tractive effort: 35,000 lbf (155.7 kN)
Career
- Operators: British Railways
- Class: D3/3; later 3/1B; no TOPS class
- Numbers: 13117–13126; later D3117–D3126
- Axle load class: Route availability 5
- Retired: 1966–1967

British Rail Class D3/3 was a 0-6-0 shunting locomotive built by British Rail at their Derby Works in England. It was similar to the British Rail Class 08, except they were built with different engines and traction motors. They were all withdrawn and scrapped after only twelve years of service.

== See also ==
- List of British Rail classes
