= Kadenacy effect =

The Kadenacy effect is an effect of pressure-waves in gases. It is named after Michel Kadenacy who obtained a French patent for an engine utilizing the effect in 1933. There are also European and US patents. In simple terms, the momentum of the exhaust gas leaving the cylinder of an internal combustion engine creates a pressure-drop in the cylinder which assists the flow of a fresh charge of air, or fuel-air mixture, into the cylinder. The effect can be maximized by careful design of the inlet and exhaust passages.

== Uses ==
The Kadenacy effect has been utilized in pulse jet engines and in two-stroke piston engines and is important in the design of high-performance motorcycle engines.

=== Two-stroke engines ===
In a two-stroke engine the pressure-drop resulting from the Kadenacy effect assists the flow of a fresh fuel-air mixture charge into the cylinder. However, the Kadenacy effect alone is not sufficient and must be boosted in some way. In small engines this is done by crankcase compression and, in large engines, by the use of a Roots supercharger or turbocharger.

== See also ==
- Exhaust pulse pressure charging
- Inertial supercharging effect
- Pressure wave supercharger
- Supercharger
