= Richard Garwood =

Royal Air Force officer (born 1959)

Sir Richard Garwood KBE, CB, DFC
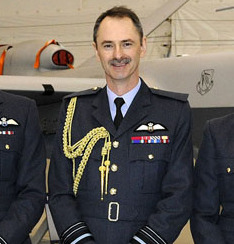
- Air Marshal Garwood in 2013
- Born: Richard Frank Garwood; 10 January 1959 (age 67); Heacham, West Norfolk
- Military career
- Allegiance: United Kingdom
- Branch: Royal Air Force
- Service years: 1979 – 2017
- Rank: Air Marshal
- Commands: No. 22 (Training) Group (2007–09); Air Component Operation Telic (2003); British Forces Operation Ramson (2001–02); RAF Marham (2000–02); No. II (AC) Squadron (1996–98)
- Conflicts: Operation Granby; Operation Ramson; Operation Telic
- Awards: Knight Commander of the Order of the British Empire; Companion of the Order of the Bath; Distinguished Flying Cross

Air Marshal Sir Richard Frank Garwood, KBE, CB, DFC (born 10 January 1959) is a retired senior Royal Air Force officer.

He was appointed Deputy Commander-in-Chief (Operations) at RAF Air Command in April 2010, initially on an acting basis – having served for less than a year as Chief of Staff (Operations) – following the reassignment of Air Marshal Tim Anderson as Director General of the new Military Aviation Authority, and pending the appointment of Air Marshal Andrew Pulford. However, following the sudden death of the then Commander-in-Chief Air Chief Marshal Sir Christopher Moran, Pulford was in turn reassigned and Garwood promoted to air marshal and confirmed in post.

Garwood was awarded the Distinguished Flying Cross for his actions in the Gulf War, and appointed Companion of the Order of the Bath in the 2010 Birthday Honours. He was appointed a Knight Commander of the Order of the British Empire in the 2017 New Year Honours.

== Service career ==
Garwood graduated from King's College London with a Master of Arts in Defence Studies. He was commissioned in 1979, being regraded on completion of Initial Officer Training and promoted to flying officer during his flying training, on completion of which he was posted to No. 41(F) Squadron at RAF Coltishall to fly the Jaguar combat aircraft in the ground attack/reconnaissance role. In 1985 Garwood was promoted to flight lieutenant and moved to the Tactical Weapons Unit at RAF Brawdy to instruct students on the Hawk training aircraft, becoming a Qualified Weapons Instructor.

In 1987, Garwood began an exchange tour with the United States Air Force, flying the RF-4C Phantom from Bergstrom Air Force Base in Texas. On his return in 1990 he converted to the Tornado GR1 before being posted as a squadron leader to No. II (Army Cooperation) Squadron at RAF Laarbruch in West Germany, being deployed to Saudi Arabia shortly after his arrival, for Operation Granby. He flew 19 night low-level reconnaissance sorties during the battle phase of the operation and was awarded the Distinguished Flying Cross.

In 1993, Garwood moved to the Ministry of Defence as a staff officer in Operational Requirements (Air) and then, in 1995, attended the Army Staff College at Camberley. In the same year he was promoted to wing commander and returned to II (AC) Squadron, now at RAF Marham, as its commanding officer. His time in command included many detachments to patrol the no-fly zones over Iraq. This was followed by a staff appointment at the Permanent Joint Headquarters at Northwood.

On promotion to group captain in 2000 Garwood returned to Marham as Station Commander, this tour including deployment to East Africa as Commander British Forces during Operation Ramson, carrying out air operations over the Horn of Africa in support of Operation Veritas in Afghanistan; he was appointed a Commander of the Order of the British Empire in 2002.

Garwood attended the Royal College of Defence Studies in 2003 before deploying to Qatar to become the first post-combat phase Air Component Commander for Operation Telic in Iraq. He returned to the UK in late 2003 to become Air Commodore Force Elements at No.1 Group, his promotion to that rank coming in January 2004. In that year he returned to the Ministry of Defence as Director of Air Staff, completing the Higher Command and Staff Course as part of his tour. In February 2007 he was posted on temporary duty as the Chief of Defence Staff’s Liaison Officer to the U.S. Chairman of the Joint Chiefs of Staff, returning in July of that year to the appointment of Air officer commanding No. 22 (Training) Group (and the concurrent appointment of Chief of Staff Training) in the rank of air vice marshal.

In July 2009 Garwood was appointed Chief of Staff Operations at Air Command and then, in April 2010, Acting Deputy Commander-in-Chief Operations following the reassignment of Air Marshal Tim Anderson – who was due to take up the appointment – to set up the Military Aviation Authority. Garwood was due to hand over this appointment to Air Marshal Andrew Pulford in September but the sudden death of the then Commander-in-Chief, Air Chief Marshal Sir Christopher Moran, resulted in Pulford in turn being reassigned, and Garwood's promotion to air marshal in June to take on the role on a permanent basis. In the same month Garwood was appointed a Companion of the Order of the Bath.

Garwood became Director-General of the Military Aviation Authority on 1 May 2013. As of 2015, Garwood was paid a salary of between £155,000 and £159,999 by the department, making him one of the 328 most highly paid people in the British public sector at that time. He became Director-General of the Defence Safety Authority in April 2015. Garwood retired in September 2017.

Already Commander of the Order of the British Empire (CBE), Garwood was appointed Knight Commander of the Order of the British Empire (KBE) in the 2017 New Year Honours.

Military offices
Preceded by John Ponsonby	Air Officer Commanding No 22 (Training) Group; 2007–2009	Succeeded by Barry North
Preceded by Nigel Maddox	Chief of Staff (Operations) RAF Air Command; 2009–2013	Succeeded by Greg Bagwell
Preceded by Iain McNicoll	Deputy Commander-in-Chief (Operations) RAF Air Command; 2010–2013	Succeeded by Greg Bagwell
Preceded by New Post	Director-General Defence Safety Authority; 2015–2017	Succeeded by Richard Felton
