= Iain McNicoll =

- Born: 3 May 1953 (age 73)
- Military career
- Allegiance: United Kingdom
- Branch: Royal Air Force
- Service years: 1975–2010
- Rank: Air Marshal
- Commands: No. 2 Group (2005–07); RAF Brüggen (1998–00); No. 17 Squadron (1992–95)
- Conflicts: Operation Allied Force
- Awards: Companion of the Order of the Bath; Commander of the Order of the British Empire; Queen's Commendation for Valuable Service in the Air

Air Marshal Iain Walter McNicoll, CB, CBE, FRAeS (born 3 May 1953) is a retired Royal Air Force officer. He was formerly Deputy Commander-in-Chief Operations, RAF Air Command.

== RAF career ==
Educated at the High School of Dundee and the University of Edinburgh, where he gained a Bachelor of Science, and having been in the East Lowlands Universities Air Squadron McNicoll joined the Royal Air Force Flying Branch in 1975.

He was appointed Officer Commanding No. 17(F) Squadron in 1992 and assistant director of Operational Capability at the Ministry of Defence in 1996. He went on to be Personal Staff Officer to the Chief of the Defence Staff in 1997 and Station Commander RAF Brüggen in 1998 in which role had operational control of the base's Tornado aircraft during 1999 NATO bombing of Yugoslavia.

He became Director of Force Development in 2000, Director-General of Joint Doctrine and Concepts in 2002 and Air Officer Commanding No. 2 Group in 2005. His last appointment was as Deputy Commander-in-Chief (Operations) at Air Command in 2007, in which role he had to defend the airworthiness of his ageing aircraft, before he retired in April 2010.

== Personal life ==
He married Wendelien van den Biggelaar, a Dutch citizen, in 1980: they have one son and two daughters.

== Reference list ==
Military offices
Preceded by Nigel Maddox	Station Commander RAF Brüggen; 1998–2000	Succeeded by Tim Anderson
Preceded by Nigel Maddox	Senior Royal Air Force Officer Germany; 1998–2000	Succeeded by Tim Anderson
Preceded by Nigel Maddox	Air Officer Commanding No. 2 Group; 2005–2007	Succeeded by Andrew Pulford
New title	Deputy Commander-in-Chief Operations RAF Air Command; 2007–2010	Succeeded by Richard Garwood
