= Peter Squires =

Peter Squires may refer to:

- Peter Squires (sportsman) (1951–2026), English cricketer and rugby union player
- Peter Squires (diver) (1936–2011), English diver
- Peter J. M. Squires (born 1968), Royal Air Force officer

== See also ==
- Peter Squire (1945–2018), Royal Air Force officer
