= Committee for Investigation of National Aviation Accidents =

- Komisja Badania Wypadków Lotniczych Lotnictwa Państwowego
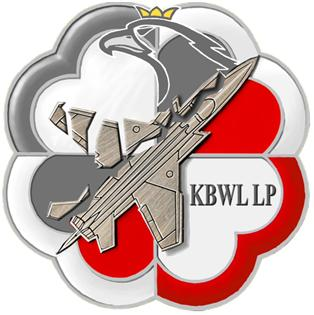

Agency overview
- Formed: 1991
- Jurisdiction: Polish territory and Polish military aircraft
- Headquarters: Warsaw, Poland
- Parent agency: Ministry of National Defense

The Committee for Investigation of National Aviation Accidents (Polish: Komisja Badania Wypadków Lotniczych Lotnictwa Państwowego; KBWLLP) is the aircraft accident investigation agency of Poland regarding state and military aircraft. It is distinct from the State Commission on Aircraft Accidents Investigation, which investigates civil aviation accidents. As of 2011, Minister of the Interior Jerzy Miller heads the agency.

The committee was established according to Paragraph 1, Article 140 of the Aviation Law of 3 July 2002, by virtue of the decision of the Minister of Defense.

The committee conducted the Polish investigation of the 2010 Polish Air Force Tu-154 crash.

== See also ==
- State Commission on Maritime Accident Investigation
- Bureau enquêtes accidents pour la sécurité de l'aéronautique d'État - The French equivalent of the committee
- Defence Safety Authority, which includes the Defence Accident Investigation Branch (DAIB), a British agency which investigates accidents to state and military aircraft
- United States Navy aircraft mishap board
- List of accidents and incidents involving military aircraft
