= Nigel Maddox =

British, former senior RAF officer

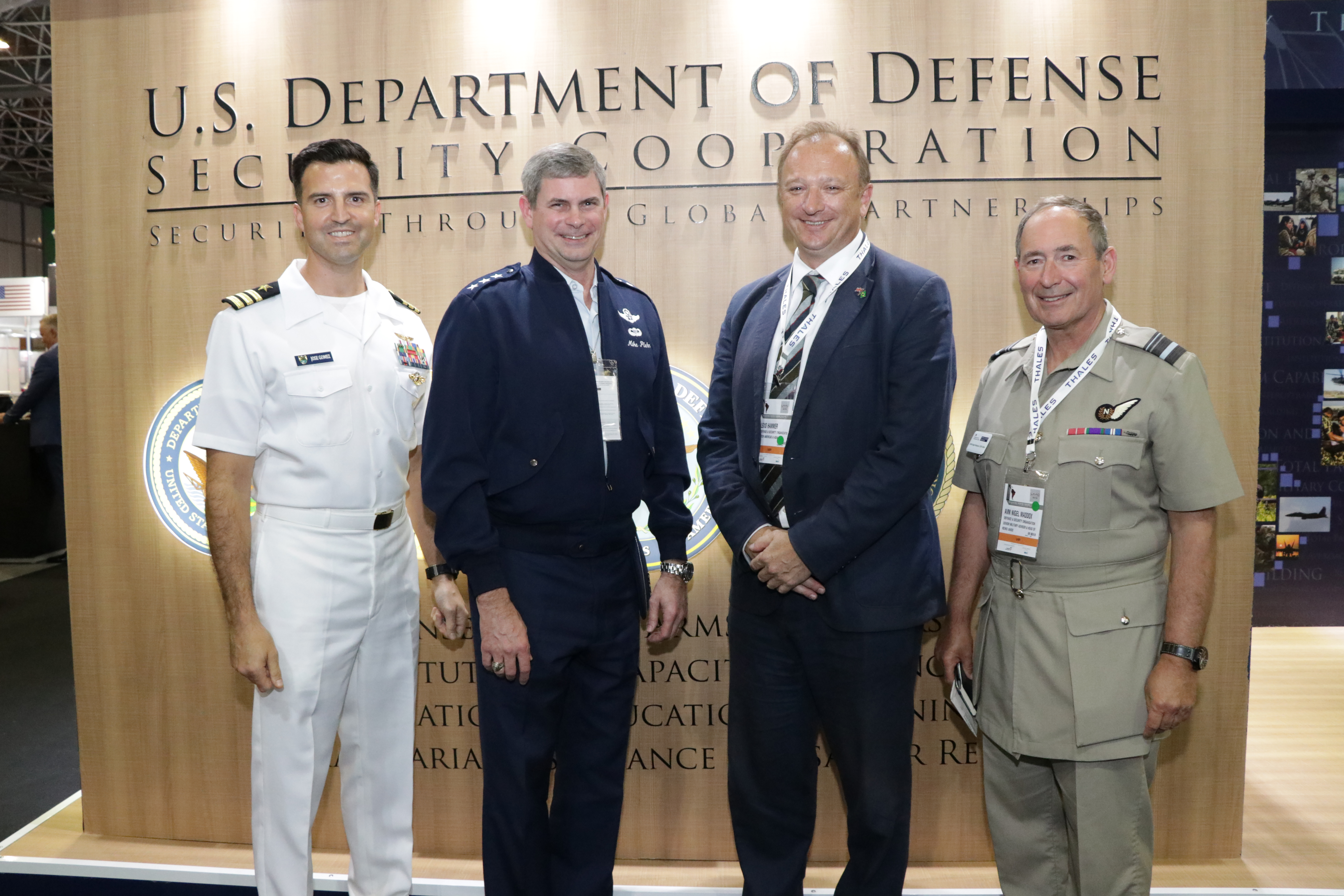
- Maddox (right)
- Born: Middlesex
- Military career
- Allegiance: United Kingdom
- Branch: Royal Air Force
- Service years: 1973–2009
- Rank: Air Vice Marshal
- Commands: Joint Services Command and Staff College (2005–07); No. 2 Group (2002–05); RAF Brüggen (1996–98); No. 12 Squadron (1991–93)
- Awards: Commander of the Order of the British Empire

Air Vice Marshal Nigel David Alan Maddox, CBE is a retired senior officer of the Royal Air Force. He is the Senior Military Adviser to the UK Department for International Trade Defence & Security Exports.

== Military career ==
Maddox was born in Middlesex and later attended Clark's Grammar School in Southend-on-Sea. He joined the Royal Air Force in 1973. He rose steadily through the ranks in a variety of roles and in 1988 studied at the Royal Naval Staff College at Greenwich, after which he became personal staff officer to the Air Officer Commanding No. 18 Group at Northwood.

Throughout the 1980s and 1990s, Maddox held various staff jobs and undertook operational tours in Germany and the Falkland Islands. In 1998 he gained a posting to Northwood as Air Officer Maritime within Headquarters No. 3 Group and subsequently, as an air vice marshal, he served as Air Officer Commanding No. 2 Group from August 2002 to July 2005. He then became Commandant of the Joint Services Command and Staff College, a post he held until September 2007.

Maddox served as Chief of Staff (Operations) at RAF Air Command until he retired from RAF service in July 2009 and was succeeded by Air Vice Marshal Richard Garwood.

== Reference list ==
Military offices
Preceded by Sir Glenn Torpy	Station Commander RAF Brüggen; 1996–1998	Succeeded by Iain McNicoll
Preceded by Sir Glenn Torpy	Senior Royal Air Force Officer Germany; 1996–1998	Succeeded by Iain McNicoll
Preceded by Keith Filbey	Air Officer Commanding No. 2 Group; 2002–2005	Succeeded by Iain McNicoll
Preceded by Nick Parker	Commandant of the Joint Services Command and Staff College; 2005–2007	Succeeded by Neil Morisetti
Preceded by Chris Harper	Chief of Staff (Operations) RAF Air Command; 2007–2009	Succeeded by Richard Garwood
