= Army Benevolent Fund =

British charitable organization

- Formation: 1944
- Type: British military support charity
- Purpose: Supporting British Armed Forces veterans, serving personnel and immediate family members
- Headquarters: London
- Region served: United Kingdom, Ireland (pre-1922)
- Official language: English
- Chief executive officer: Major General (Ret’d) Tim Hyams CB OBE
- Website: https://armybenevolentfund.org/

The Army Benevolent Fund, formerly ABF The Soldiers' Charity, is the national charity of the British Army. Since 1944, it has provided a lifetime of support to soldiers, veterans and their immediate families when they are in need.

In the financial year 22/23, the charity helped 70,000 people in 45 countries worldwide, and funded 74 other charities and organisations that deliver frontline services.

== History ==
Winston Churchill’s War Cabinet discussed the formation of the Army Benevolent Fund a national charity for the British Army to ensure support would be available for soldiers, veterans and their families in peacetime. The Army Benevolent Fund was founded in 1944 as the Army Benevolent Fund. The demobilisation of soldiers after the two World Wars had put an enormous strain on Regimental and Corps charitable funds and highlighted the need for a national charity to give practical help to soldiers and veterans. Its first patron was King George VI, who was later succeeded by Queen Elizabeth II and then Queen Camilla.

The charity continues to support the Army family by giving grants to individuals and other specialist charities that help soldiers and their families. It works with veterans from every conflict since the Second World War, including those from recent operations in Iraq and Afghanistan.

In 2010, the charity changed its name to ABF The Soldiers’ Charity, in response to external factors within the sector. In November 2023, after research confirmed the name Army Benevolent Fund had remained a widely recognised brand, which resonates powerfully with core supporters and serving soldiers the charity reverted to the name Army Benevolent Fund.

== Events ==
The charity runs key national events as part of its fundraising activities:

The Cateran Yomp – The annual Cateran Yomp sees participants trek across the 54 mile Cateran Trail in Blairgowrie, Perthshire. Since the first Yomp in 2010 it has raised over £4,400,000 for the Charity.

Adventure Challenges – The charity regularly undertakes a variety of adventure challenges, including tandem skydives with The Red Devils (the official parachute display team of both The Parachute Regiment (The Paras) and the British Army), the London Marathon and the Frontline Walk.

== Partner charities ==
The Army Benevolent Fund is a key funder for many specialist organisations who rely on such funding to continue their bespoke support to the Army family and partners, alongside over 92 military service charities including the Royal British Legion, RAF Benevolent Fund, Royal Navy & Royal Marines Charity, SSAFA and Combat Stress.

== Beneficiaries and ambassadors ==
Every year, thousands of individuals received welfare support from ABF The Soldiers' Charity. Many of these individuals have gone on to become ambassadors for The Soldiers' Charity, sharing their stories in order to raise much needed funds and awareness for the cause. These individuals include:

Stewart Harris, former infantryman served with the 1st Battalion The Welsh Guards. Whilst on tour in Afghanistan in 2012, a roadside bomb hurled Stewart's vehicle into a ditch leaving him with brain damage; the impact of which has left him partially sighted and partially deaf. The same year he also witnessed three of his comrades shot dead by an Afghan policeman. Stewart was later diagnosed with post traumatic stress disorder before leaving the Army at the age of 28; the culmination of 13 years' service. He now spends his time trying to help other injured soldiers suffering with mental health issues.

John Cutting served in the Royal Engineers from 1970 to 1974. He joined the Army when he was 18 years old and deployed on back to back tours of Northern Ireland at the height of the Troubles. John also served as a Reservist in the infantry between 1982 and 1984. John suffers with PTSD and has found therapy in art. He decided to apply for a three-year BA (Hons) degree course in Fine Art at Teesside University and since specialises in sculptures. With thanks to the Trustees of The Royal Edinburgh Military Tattoo Charities (Limited), The Soldiers' Charity stepped in to help John with a bursary to help him with living costs whilst he studies.

Joseph Connor, a Trooper with 15th (Scottish) Reconnaissance Regiment, found himself on the frontline of the Allied Invasion of Normandy during Operation Overlord. He was part of a recce team whose job was to pinpoint enemy positions, often being the driver of the front vehicle going towards the German lines. Joseph has recently been awarded the Chevalier de la Légion d'honneur. ABF The Soldiers' Charity funded a new driveway that allowed Joseph to drive his car and his mobility scooter right up to his front door.

Brenda Hale, a Democratic Unionist Party politician in Northern Ireland, lost her husband Captain Mark Hale, 2 RIFLES, when he was serving in Afghanistan in 2009. In 2011 Brenda was elected to the Northern Ireland Assembly for the Lagan Valley.

Andy Reid, who lost both his legs and his right arm after stepping on an IED plate whilst serving with the 3rd Battalion The Yorkshire Regiment in Afghanistan in 2009. Since recovering from his injuries, Andy has written an autobiography, Standing Tall, and in 2010 was presented with the Overcoming Adversity award at The Sun Military Awards ceremony. Andy is now a motivational speaker working with some of the UK's leading companies.

== High-profile supporters ==
High-profile individuals who have provided support for the charity include people from the worlds of film, TV, sport, music and entertainment, who choose to support the charity on a wide range of fundraising, awareness and campaigning activity. Previous and ongoing supporters of the Charity include J. K. Rowling, Rowan Atkinson, Will Carling, Jeremy Clarkson, Judi Dench, Ben Fogle, Stephen Fry, Michael Gambon, Bear Grylls, Colin Jackson, Alex Jones, Lorraine Kelly, Josh Lewsey, Gary Lineker, Joanna Lumley, Jason Manford, Michael Morpurgo, Bill Nighy, Jeremy Paxman, Maggie Smith, Caroline Quentin, Dan Snow, Chris Tarrant, Jonny Wilkinson, Ray Winstone, Union J, Blue, and James Blunt.

== Corporate sponsors ==
The charity has a range of corporate partners and supporters that includes MBDA, Barclays and BAE Systems.

== Patrons and trustees ==
Patron: Queen Camilla

President: General Sir James Everard KCB CBE

Chair of the Board of Trustees: Sarah Booth

== See also ==
- RAF Benevolent Fund
- RNRMC
- SSAFA
- The Royal British Legion
