= Richard Felton =

British Army general

Lieutenant General Richard Felton CBE
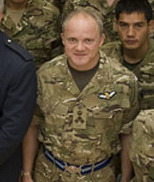
- Brigadier Felton in 2011
- Military career
- Allegiance: United Kingdom
- Branch: British Army
- Service years: 1985–2019
- Rank: Lieutenant General
- Service number: 522846
- Commands: Defence Safety Authority; Joint Helicopter Command; Task Force Helmand; 4th Mechanized Brigade; 9 Regiment Army Air Corps
- Conflicts: The Troubles; War in Afghanistan; Iraq War
- Awards: Commander of the Order of the British Empire; Mentioned in dispatches Queen's Commendation for Valuable Service

Lieutenant General Richard Friedrich Patrick Felton, CBE is a former British Army officer who served as Director-General of the Defence Safety Authority from 2017 to 2019.

== Military career ==
Felton was commissioned into the Royal Corps of Transport on 6 September 1985. He became Commanding Officer of 9 Regiment Army Air Corps in April 2004, Chief of Staff of 1st (United Kingdom) Armoured Division in April 2007 and Commander of 4th Mechanized Brigade in January 2009. It was in this role that he was deployed as Commander of Task Force Helmand in April 2010. He went on to be Chief of Joint Forces Operations at Joint Forces Headquarters in March 2011 and Commander of Joint Helicopter Command in March 2014. He was promoted to lieutenant-general as he became Director-General of the Defence Safety Authority on 28 April 2017.

Military offices
Preceded by Carl Dixon	Commander Joint Helicopter Command; 2014–2017	Succeeded by Jonathan Pentreath
Preceded by Richard Garwood	Director-General Defence Safety Authority; 2017–2019	Succeeded by Sue Gray
