= Defence Safety Authority =

UK Ministry of Defence agency

Agency overview
- Formed: 1 April 2015
- Jurisdiction: United Kingdom
- Headquarters: Main Building, Whitehall, Westminster
- Agency executive: Air Marshal Alan Gillespie
- Parent agency: Ministry of Defence

The Defence Safety Authority (DSA) is an agency of the United Kingdom Ministry of Defence that regulates safety and investigates accidents in the UK's Armed Forces.

The DSA was launched on 1 April 2015 and brings together the Defence Safety and Environment Authority (DSEA), Military Aviation Authority (MAA) and Defence Fire Safety Regulator (DFSR), to form a single common managed organization under the leadership of a 3-star Director General (DG) – DG DSA. The Director-General is also the head of the Defence Accident Investigation Branch (DAIB) (formerly the Military Air Accident Investigation Branch (MilAAIB) and the Land Accident Investigation Team (LAIT)).

== Directors-General ==
The Directors-General have been: The Directors-General have been:

- 2015–2017: Air Marshal Richard Garwood
- 2017–2019: Lieutenant-General Richard Felton
- 2019–2022: Air Marshal Sue Gray
- 2022–2024: Air Marshal Steve Shell
- 2024-present: Air Marshal Alan Gillespie

== Agencies ==
The Defence Accident Investigation Branch (DAIB), a part of the DSA which investigates accidents and incidents in military transport, has its head office in Building 120 at MOD Boscombe Down. It was formerly known as the Military Air Accident Investigation Branch (MilAAIB). Previously its head office was at Farnborough House, and MilAAIB employees were generally located in Farnborough.

== See also ==
- Bureau enquêtes accidents pour la sécurité de l'aéronautique d'État - The French equivalent of the aviation sector of the DAIB
- Committee for Investigation of National Aviation Accidents - The Polish equivalent of the aviation sector of the DAIB
- United States Navy aircraft mishap board
- List of accidents and incidents involving military aircraft
