= Military Aviation Authority =

UK military aviation regulator, part of the UK Ministry of Defence

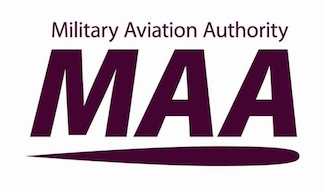

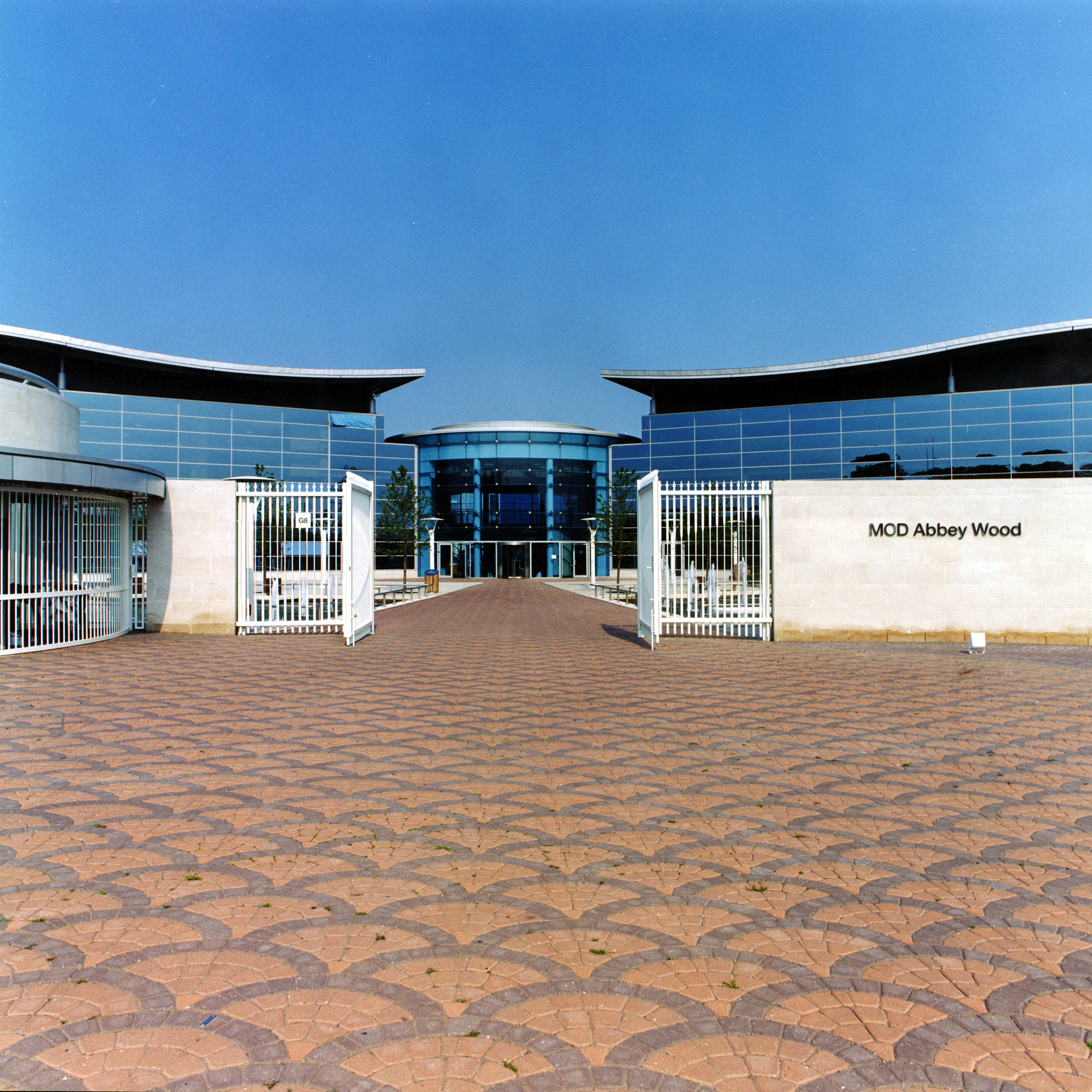
- MOD Abbey Wood in Filton, Bristol, location of the Military Aviation Authority

Aviation regulatory authority overview
- Formed: 1 April 2010; 16 years ago
- Preceding agencies: Defence Aviation Safety Centre; Directorate of Aviation Regulation & Safety
- Type: military aircraft regulator
- Jurisdiction: Monarch of the United Kingdom, Government of the United Kingdom
- Status: active
- Headquarters: MOD Abbey Wood (North), Filton, Bristol, England, BS34 8QW, UK; 51°30′11.88″N 02°33′33.01″W
- Motto: a world class air safety regulator
- Aviation regulatory authority executives: Air Vice Marshal Peter J. M. Squires, (director); Rear Admiral Thomas Manson, (technical director)
- Parent aviation regulatory authority: Ministry of Defence and Defence Safety Authority
- Website: MAA.MoD.uk

The Military Aviation Authority (MAA) is an organisation within the United Kingdom (UK) Ministry of Defence (MOD), and is the single regulatory authority responsible for regulating all aspects of air safety across all service branches of the British Armed Forces. The MAA has full oversight of all defence aviation activity within the United Kingdom, and overseas locations where British military aircraft and / or military unmanned air systems (UAS; unmanned aerial vehicle along with its ground-based controller system, collectively known as 'drones' in common parlance) are permanently based, or deployed on a temporary basis. The MAA is also responsible for the allocation and assignment of the United Kingdom military aircraft registration mark to all British military aircraft on the United Kingdom Military Aircraft Register (UK MAR). Its stated aim or 'vision' is to be "a world class air safety regulator".

== Organisational structure ==
The Military Aviation Authority is part of the Ministry of Defence, but operates independently, via a Charter signed by the Secretary of State for Defence. The MAA is headed by its Director, currently Air Vice Marshal Peter J. M. Squires, OBE ADC RAF; assisted by its Technical director, Rear Admiral Thomas Manson.

== History ==
The Military Aviation Authority was established on 1 April 2010; 16 years ago, in response to the recommendations made by Mr Justice Haddon-Cave in his Nimrod Review, which called for a radical overhaul of military airworthiness regulation.

The MAA incorporates the former Directorate of Aviation Regulation & Safety (DARS), previously known as the Defence Aviation Safety Centre (DASC) which had been located at RAF Bentley Priory in Greater London until the station closed in 2008 and the organisation subsequently moved to RAF Northolt. The MAA is currently located within the North building of MOD Abbey Wood at Filton in Bristol, south-west England.

On 1 April 2015, the MAA became part of the Defence Safety Authority (DSA).

== Principal personnel ==
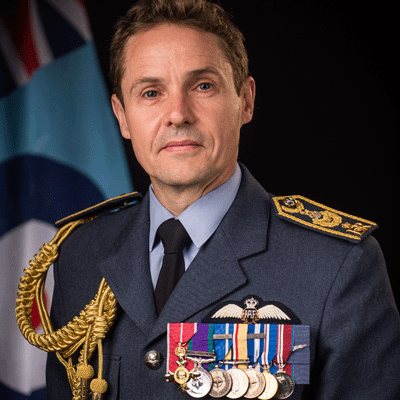
AVM Peter Squires, OBE ADC RAF, current MAA director since 2025.

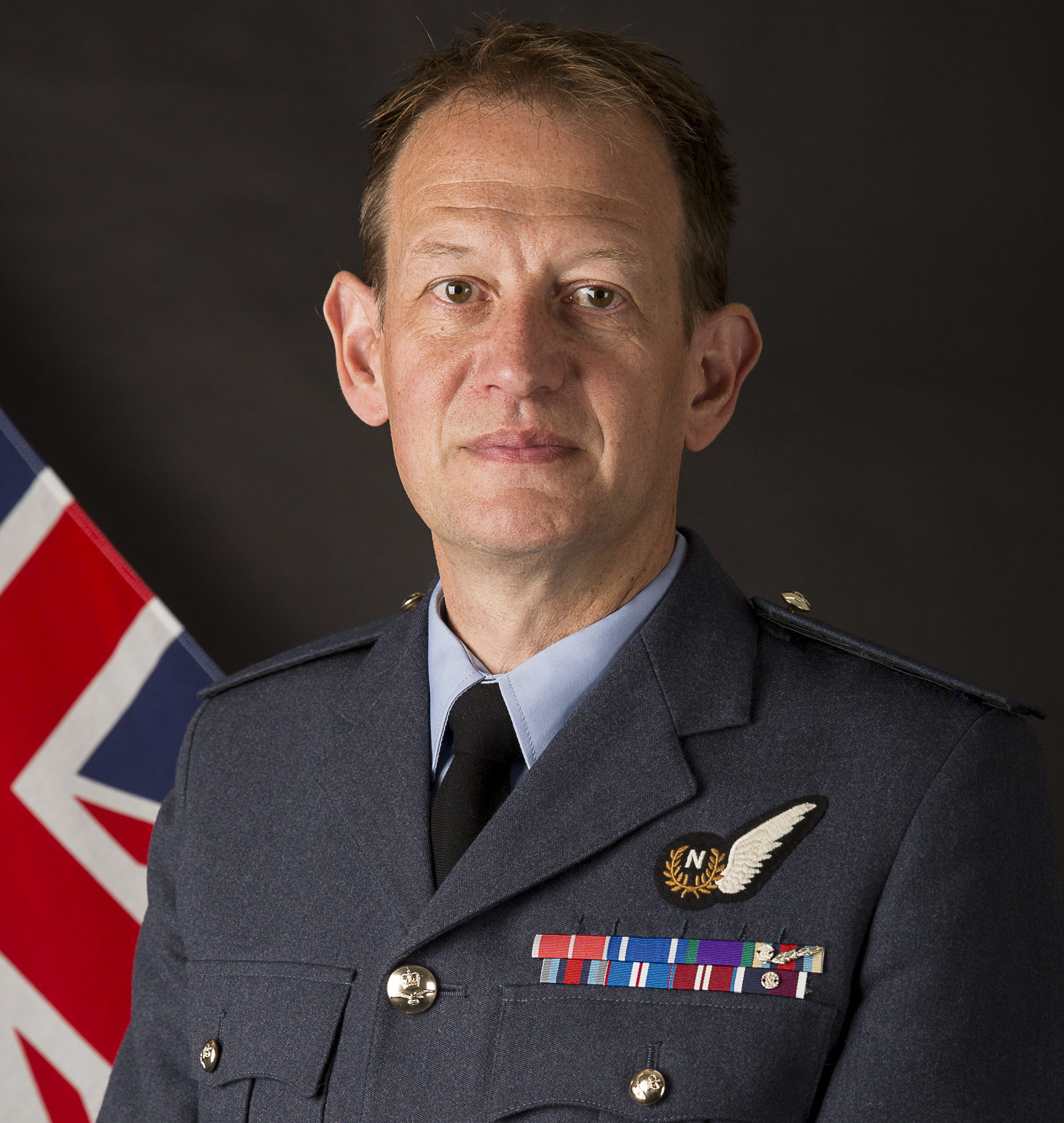
AVM Alan Gillespie, former MAA director (2021–2025).

The Military Aviation Authority is led by:

- Director – Air Vice Marshal Peter J. M. Squires
- Technical director – Rear Admiral Thomas Manson

=== Previous personnel ===
==== Director general ====
- Air Marshal Tim Anderson (2010–2013)
- Air Marshal Richard Garwood (2013–2015)

==== Director ====
- Rear Admiral Paul Chivers (2015–2018)
- Air Vice-Marshal Stephen Shell (2018–2021)
- Air Vice Marshal Alan Gillespie (2021–2025)
- Air Vice Marshal Peter J. M. Squires (2025–present)
