= David Walker (RAF aircrew officer) =

Royal Air Force officer (1956–2023)

- Born: 30 October 1956
- Died: 18 June 2023 (aged 66)
- Military career
- Allegiance: United Kingdom
- Branch: Royal Air Force
- Service years: 1978–2013
- Rank: Air Marshal
- Commands: No. 1 Group; RAF Cottesmore; No. 1 Squadron
- Conflicts: Operation Veritas; Iraq War; War in Afghanistan
- Awards: Companion of the Order of the Bath; Commander of the Order of the British Empire; Air Force Cross

Air Marshal David Walker, CB, CBE, AFC (30 October 1956 – 18 June 2023) was a senior Royal Air Force officer. He was the Deputy Commander, Allied Joint Force Command at Brunssum in the Netherlands from 2011 to 2013, having previously served for over three years as Deputy Commander, Allied Air Component Command at Ramstein in Germany. Prior to that appointment he was Air Officer Commanding No. 1 Group in the United Kingdom.

== Early life and education ==
Walker was born on 30 October 1956 in Hertfordshire, England. He was educated at Hatfield Technical Grammar School, a state school in Hatfield, Hertfordshire. He studied geography at the University of Bristol, graduating with a Bachelor of Science (BSc) degree.

He later took a Master of Arts (MA) degree in defence studies at King's College London, and undertook a Portal Fellowship for a Doctor of Philosophy with King's College London at the Royal Air Force College Cranwell.

== RAF career ==
Having joined the Royal Air Force (RAF) on the university graduate scheme, Walker was commissioned as an acting pilot officer on 1 August 1975, He was regraded as a pilot officer on graduation in 1978. He was promoted to flying officer and flight lieutenant the following year. He completed flying tours in Germany, the United States, and the United Kingdom, flying the Harrier and F/A-18 Hornet, He was promoted to squadron leader in 1987. He was awarded the Air Force Cross (AFC) in the 1988 New Year Honours. Promoted to wing commander in 1993, Walker went on to command No. 1 Squadron, flying operational missions over Iraq and Bosnia, before becoming Military Assistant to the Minister of State for the Armed Forces, serving the Honourable Nicholas Soames and then Dr John Reid.

Walker was promoted to group captain in 1997, and attended the Higher Command and Staff Course in 1999, before taking command of RAF Cottesmore and the UK Harrier Force. In 2001 he was posted to HQ No. 3 Group, spending most of that tour deployed overseas supporting operations in Afghanistan as part of Operation Enduring Freedom; he was appointed Commander of the Order of the British Empire in the 2002 New Year Honours. Promoted to air commodore in 2002, he took up the post of Assistant Chief of Staff J3 (Operations) in the Permanent Joint Headquarters, with responsibility for the management of all United Kingdom expeditionary operations, but with his main focus being Operation Telic, the United Kingdom's contribution to the Iraq War.

Promoted to air vice marshal and appointed Assistant Chief of the Air Staff in October 2003, Walker became responsible for the detailed handling of overall RAF policy, relations with NATO and other allies and the change agenda, being closely involved in the Eurofighter Typhoon programme. In April 2005 Walker took command of No. 1 Group, with responsibility for the RAF's fast jet forces. In April 2006 he also assumed responsibility for the RAF Support Helicopter Force contribution to the UK Joint Helicopter Command.

In June 2007 Walker was promoted to air marshal and appointed Deputy Commander, Allied Air Component Command at Ramstein. In July 2010 he was appointed to co-lead the Joint US/NATO Ballistic Missile Defence Task Force, to develop Operational Concepts. Walker was appointed Companion of the Order of the Bath in the 2011 New Year Honours, and in March of that year he became Deputy Commander Allied Joint Force Command Brunssum.

== Later life and death ==
In 2015, Walker became National President of the Royal British Legion. He also served as a commissioner of the Commonwealth War Graves Commission.

Walker died of brain cancer on 18 June 2023, at the age of 66.

Military offices
Preceded by Clive Loader	Chief of Staff Operations (J3), Permanent Joint Headquarters; 2002–2003	Succeeded by Alan Massey
Preceded by Philip Sturley	Assistant Chief of the Air Staff; 2003–2005	Succeeded by Chris Moran
Preceded by Chris Moran	Air Officer Commanding No. 1 Group; 2005–2007	Succeeded by Chris Harper
Preceded by H Martin (Germany)	Deputy Commander, Allied Air Component Command, Ramstein; 2007–2010	Succeeded by F W Ploeger (Germany)
Preceded by Chris Harper	Deputy Commander, Allied Joint Force Command, Brunssum; 2011–2013	Unknown
