= Barry North =

English RAF officer (born 1959)

Sir Barry North
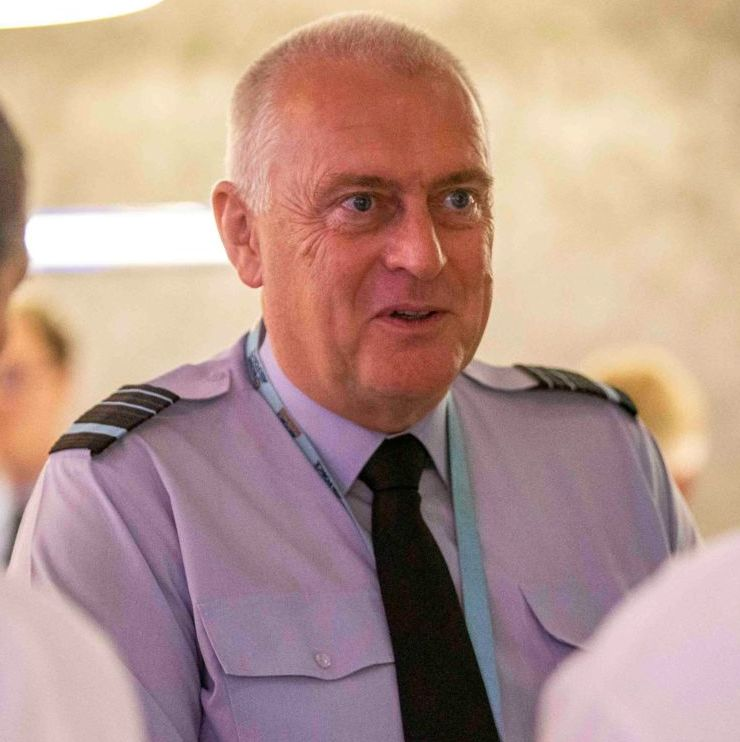
- Air Marshal North in 2019
- Born: 13 September 1959 (age 67)
- Military career
- Allegiance: United Kingdom
- Branch: Royal Air Force
- Service years: 1982–2016
- Rank: Air Marshal
- Nickname: Baz
- Commands: Air Member for Personnel (2013–16); No. 22 (Training) Group (2009–10); No. 83 Expeditionary Air Group (2006); RAF Aldergrove (2004–06); No. 33 Squadron (1999–2002); Special Forces Flight, No. 7 Squadron (1992–96); No. 78 Squadron (1991–92)
- Conflicts: Operation Banner
- Awards: Knight Commander of the Order of the Bath; Officer of the Order of the British Empire; Queen's Commendation for Valuable Service

Air Marshal Sir Barry Mark North, KCB, OBE (born 13 September 1959) is a retired senior Royal Air Force officer, who served as Deputy Commander (Personnel) at RAF Air Command. A helicopter pilot, North has held command appointments at all levels, notably No. 78 Squadron in the Falkland Islands, the Special Forces Flight as a squadron leader and the newly established No. 83 Expeditionary Air Group in the Middle East as an air commodore.

== Early life and education ==
North was born in September 1959. He was educated at Carre's Grammar School in Sleaford. He completed a Higher National Diploma in Business Studies at Trent Polytechnic (a predecessor of Nottingham Trent University). He was awarded 'Alumnus of the Year' by Nottingham Trent University in 2011. He also holds a Master of Arts in Defence Studies from King's College London.

== Military career ==
North was commissioned as an acting pilot officer in July 1982 – initially on a Short Service Commission – having won two trophies during Initial Officer Training. He was regraded to pilot officer in July 1983 during his flying training, and promoted to flying officer in July 1984 prior to being posted to No. 72 Squadron in Northern Ireland in August of that year to fly the Westland Wessex.

North transferred to a Permanent Commission in September 1986, and was promoted to flight lieutenant in January 1987, converting to the Chinook before beginning his first tour with the Special Forces Flight of No. 7 Squadron at RAF Odiham in March. He then served as Aide-de-Camp to the Chief of the Defence Staff, Marshal of the Royal Air Force Sir David Craig from December 1988 until March 1991, being promoted to squadron leader in January 1991, before taking command of No. 78 Squadron in the Falkland Islands, flying both the Chinook and Sea King aircraft, in July.

North returned to the Special Forces Flight in September 1992 as its commander, and was appointed a Member of the Order of the British Empire in the 1996 Birthday Honours List, having relinquished that command and joined the Army Command and Staff Course in March. He was awarded a Master of Arts in Defence Studies in 1997, having taken up the post of Personal Staff Officer to the Air Officer Commanding No. 1 Group in December 1996, serving Air Vice Marshals John Day and Jock Stirrup in that role, until his promotion to wing commander in July 1998, and a transfer to Headquarters Strike Command as Wing Commander Operations.

In October 1999 North took command of No. 33 Squadron, flying the Puma aircraft from RAF Benson, leading the squadron on the first operation of the newly formed Joint Helicopter Command (JHC) providing humanitarian aid to the people of Mozambique following catastrophic flooding in early 2000. In May 2002 North moved to Headquarters JHC as Deputy Assistant Chief of Staff – Personnel, Policy & Plans and Communications, his promotion to group captain following in January 2003. Having led the planning for JHC's role in the invasion of Iraq, he was upgraded to Officer of the Order of the British Empire in the 2003 New Year Honours List. In April 2004 he was appointed the Station Commander of RAF Aldergrove, also concurrently holding the positions of Senior RAF Officer Northern Ireland and Commander Joint Helicopter Force Northern Ireland.

In 2006, as an acting air commodore, North became the first commander of the newly established No. 83 Expeditionary Air Group, formed to control all RAF air assets within the Middle East theatre of operations, including the commitments to Iraq and Afghanistan; he received a Queen's Commendation for Valuable Service in December of that year. In January 2007 North received his substantive promotion to air commodore, and was appointed Head of Air Resources and Plans at the Ministry of Defence.

North was promoted to air vice marshal and appointed Air Officer Commanding No. 22 (Training) Group in July 2009, becoming Assistant Chief of the Air Staff in March 2010. He was promoted to air marshal and appointed Deputy Commander (Personnel) at RAF Air Command on 3 May 2013. He was appointed Knight Commander of the Order of the Bath (KCB) in the 2015 New Year Honours.

North retired from the RAF in May 2016. He has been President of the Royal Air Forces Association (RAFA) since July 2017.

Military offices
New title	Air Officer Commanding No. 83 Expeditionary Air Group; February – September 2006	Succeeded by Clive Bairsto
Preceded by Andrew Pulford	Head of Air Resources and Plans, Ministry of Defence; 2007–2009	Succeeded by S K P Reynolds
Preceded by Richard Garwood	Air Officer Commanding No. 22 (Training) Group; 2009–2010	Succeeded by M C Green
Preceded by Tim Anderson	Assistant Chief of the Air Staff; 2010–2013	Succeeded by Edward Stringer
Preceded by Andrew Pulford	Deputy Commander-in-Chief Personnel Air Command; Air Member for Personnel; 2013–2016	Succeeded by Sean Reynolds
