= Steve Shell =

Air Marshal Steve Shell CB OBE
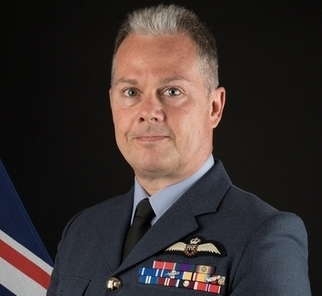
- Air Vice-Marshal Shell in 2019
- Military career
- Allegiance: United Kingdom
- Branch: Royal Air Force
- Service years: 1988–2025
- Rank: Air Marshal
- Service number: 8029793F
- Commands: RAF Odiham; No. 27 Squadron RAF
- Conflicts: Gulf War; Iraq War; Operation Highbrow; War in Afghanistan
- Awards: Companion of the Order of the Bath; Officer of the Order of the British Empire; Queen's Commendation for Valuable Service; Bronze Star Medal (United States)

Air Marshal Stephen Jeffrey Shell, CB, OBE is a British retired senior Royal Air Force officer. He served as director general of the Defence Safety Authority (DSA) from January 2022 to November 2024. He had served as director of the Military Aviation Authority from 2018 to 2021. Since 2025, he has been CEO of SSAFA.

== RAF career ==
Shell was commissioned in the General Duties Branch of the Royal Air Force on 5 May 1988 as an acting pilot officer. He was regraded to pilot officer on 5 May 1989, promoted to flying officer on 5 May 1990, and to flight lieutenant on 5 November 1993. He trained and served as a Chinook pilot. In the half yearly promotions, he was promoted to squadron leader on 1 July 1998, and to wing commander on 1 January 2003. He was officer commanding No. 27 Squadron RAF from 2005 to 2007, during which the squadron was involved in evacuating British citizens from Lebanon and deployed to Afghanistan as part of Operation Herrick. From 2009 to 2011, he was station commander of RAF Odiham and commanding officer of the UK Chinook Force.

On 12 December 2018, Shell was appointed director of the Military Aviation Authority. On 7 January 2022, he was appointed director general of the Defence Safety Authority (DSA) and promoted to air marshal.

Shell retired from the Royal Air Force on 12 April 2025.

== Later life ==
On 2 April 2025, Shell became chief executive officer of SSAFA, in succession to Sir Andrew Gregory.

== Honours ==
In 2006, Shell was awarded the Bronze Star Medal by the United States "in recognition of gallant and distinguished services during coalition operations in Iraq". In July 2007, he was awarded the Queen's Commendation for Valuable Service "in recognition of gallant and distinguished services in Afghanistan during the period 1st October 2006 to 31st March 2007". In the 2008 New Year Honours, he was appointed an Officer of the Order of the British Empire (OBE). In 2018, he received the Royal Air Force Long Service and Good Conduct Medal with 1 Clasp (i.e. 15 years plus 10 years service). In the 2021 New Year Honours, he was appointed a Companion of the Order of the Bath (CB).

Military offices
| Preceded by Sue Gray | Director-General Defence Safety Authority; 2022–2024 | Succeeded by Alan Gillespie |
