= Air League =

British aviation organisation

The Air League
- Formation: 17 February 1909; 117 years ago
- Type: UK Registered Charity
- Registration no.: 1129969
- Headquarters: 4 Hamilton Place, London, United Kingdom
- Region served: United Kingdom
- Former Patron: The Late Prince Philip, Duke of Edinburgh (1952-2021)
- President: Air Marshal Sir Christopher Harper
- Chairman: John Steel KC
- Website: www.airleague.co.uk

The Air League is an aviation and aerospace non-profit organisation based in the United Kingdom. It is the UK's largest provider of aviation and aerospace scholarships and bursaries.

The Air League aims to inspire, enable, and support the next generation of aviation and aerospace professionals from all backgrounds across the UK. Each year thousands of people from around the UK, including disadvantaged youngsters and wounded and injured servicemen and women benefit from Air League support.

== History ==
Founded in 1909 as "The Aerial League of The British Empire", The Air League was formed to counter 'the backwardness and apathy' shown by the UK in the face of emerging aeronautical developments and to stress the 'vital importance from a commercial and national defence point of view of this new means of communication'.

The founders of the Air League were concerned that Britain was falling behind other nations in the development of its aviation capability. They foresaw the threats, both military and commercial, to the country's future wellbeing if aviation was not made central to government thinking. When the First World War broke out five years later, Britain was taking aviation sufficiently seriously to be able to develop and produce aircraft that could hold their own in the rapidly evolving scramble for air superiority.

In 1938 The Air League founded the Air Defence Cadet Corps, which is now the Air Training Corps.

== Presidents ==
- Henry Lascelles, 6th Earl of Harewood, (1945–1947)
- Air Chief Marshal Sir Philip Joubert de la Ferté (1947–1954)
- Samuel Hoare, 1st Viscount Templewood (1954–1956)
- Archibald Sinclair, 1st Viscount Thurso (1956–1958)
- Douglas Douglas-Hamilton, 14th Duke of Hamilton (1959–1968)
- Prince Philip, Duke of Edinburgh (1959) – for the period of the Air League Jubilee celebrations
- Air Chief Marshal Sir Francis Fogarty (1968–1972)
- Air Chief Marshal Sir Denis Smallwood (1980–1984)
- Marshal of the RAF Sir John Grandy (1984–1987)
- Air Marshal Sir Charles Ness (1987–1990)
- Sir Michael Cobham (1990–1993)
- James Ewart Henderson CVO (1993–1996)
- Baron Tebbit (1996–1999)
- Air Chief Marshal Sir Michael Knight (1999–2004)
- Sir Michael Marshall (2004–2009)
- Air Chief Marshal Sir Brian Burridge (2009–2014)
- Sir Roger Bone KCMG (2014–2021)
- Air Marshal Sir Christopher Harper (2021–present)

== Women's Aerial League ==
The Women's Aerial League was also set up in 1909 – on 4 May

Relations with the Aerial League were friendly, but this organisation led its own existence, and also set up the Boys' and Girls' Aerial League. It was merged into the Aerial League in 1910.
