= Combat Stress (charitable organisation) =

UK charity

- Formation: 12 May 1919; 107 years ago
- Type: Charitable organisation
- Registration no.: England and Wales: 206002 (as Ex-Services Mental Welfare Society)
- Purpose: Treating post traumatic stress disorder (PTSD), and other mental health issues
- Location(s): Tyrwhitt House, Oaklawn Road, Leatherhead, Surrey; KT22 0BX
- Region served: United Kingdom
- Key people: Charles, Prince of Wales (Patron); General Sir Peter Wall (President)
- Affiliations: Member of COBSEO
- Revenue: £14.96 million (2015)
- Employees: 285 (2015)
- Volunteers: 55 (2015)
- Website: combatstress.org.uk
- Formerly called: Ex-Services Mental Welfare Society; Ex-Servicemen's Welfare Society

Combat Stress is a registered charity in the United Kingdom offering therapeutic and clinical community and residential treatment to former members of the British Armed Forces who are suffering from a range of mental health conditions; including post traumatic stress disorder (PTSD). Combat Stress makes available treatment for all Veterans who are suffering with mental illness free of charge.

On average, it takes 13 years for a Veteran to first contact with Combat Stress for advice, help, and treatment; however for those who served in Iraq (Gulf War I and Gulf War II) and Afghanistan, the time period is much lower.

The charity was formed in 1919, as the Ex-Servicemen's Welfare Society, following World War I; when the effects of shell shock were becoming known.

== History before 1919 ==
=== World War I ===
Soldiers (and other frontline personnel) returning home from World War I suffered greatly from the horrors of war that they had witnessed. Many returning veterans suffered from what was then known as shell shock; now known as post traumatic stress disorder (PTSD).

In 1915, the British Army in France was instructed that:

Shell-shock and shell concussion cases should have the letter 'W' prefixed to the report of the casualty, if it were due to the enemy; in that case the patient would be entitled to rank as 'wounded' and to wear on his arm a 'wound stripe'. If, however, the man’s breakdown did not follow a shell explosion, it was not thought to be ‘due to the enemy’, and he was to [be] labelled 'shell-shock' or 'S' (for sickness) and was not entitled to a wound stripe or a pension.

In August 1916, Charles Myers was made Consulting Psychologist to the Army. He hammered home the notion that it was necessary to create special centres near the line using treatment based on:

- Promptness of action;
- Suitable environment;
- Psychotherapeutic measures.

In December 1916, Gordon Holmes was put in charge of the northern, and more important, part of the western front. He had much more of the tough attitudes of the Army, and suited the prevailing military mindset, and so his view prevailed. By June 1917, all British cases of 'shell-shock' were evacuated to a nearby neurological centre, and were labelled as NYDN – 'not yet diagnosed nervous'. "But, because of the Adjutant-General's distrust of doctors, no patient could receive that specialist attention until Form AF 3436 had been sent off to the man’s unit and filled in by his commanding officer." This created significant delays, but demonstrated that between 4-10% of shell-shock W cases were 'commotional' (due to physical causes), and the rest were 'emotional'. This killed off shell-shock as a valid disease, and it was abolished in September 1918.

During the war, 306 British soldiers were executed for cowardice; many of whom were victims of shell shock. On 7 November 2006, the Government of the United Kingdom gave them all a posthumous conditional pardon. The Shot at Dawn Memorial at the National Memorial Arboretum in Staffordshire commemorates these men.

== Present work ==
Combat Stress was formed at a time when there was little known about mental health problems affecting ex-Service men and women who had returned home after serving in war and conflict zones.

Currently, the organisation is helping almost 6,000 people who are Veterans aged from 19 to 97. Combat Stress are currently treating 971 Veterans who served in Afghanistan and 1,185 who served in Iraq.

Support is currently being given to those who suffer from:

- Clinical depression
- Raised anxiety states
- Substance abuse (drug and alcohol)
- Post traumatic stress disorder (PTSD)

This support is delivered throughout England, Scotland, Wales, and Northern Ireland; through three treatment centres (Hollybush House, Ayr, Ayrshire, Scotland; Audley Court, Newport, Shropshire, England and Tyrwhitt House, Leatherhead, Surrey, England). Hollybush House and Tyrwhitt House offer residential support and Audley Court operates as an outpatient base along with community outreach teams.

== Services ==
Services are provided by qualified professionals which include psychotherapists, Occupational Therapists, Nurses and Art Therapists

- Treatments for PTSD which include:
  - Cognitive behavioural therapy (CBT)
  - Trauma focused cognitive behavioural therapy
  - Occupational Therapy
  - Behaviour therapy
  - Cognitive therapy
  - Solution-focused therapy
  - Art therapy
  - Anger management
  - Anxiety management
  - Sleep hygiene
  - Social skills training
  - Occupational and recreational therapies
- Treatment centres
- Tyrwhitt House in Leatherhead
- Hollybush House in Ayr
- Audley Court in Newport, Shropshire

Leatherhead and Ayr offer a residential treatment service and Newport offers only outpatient treatment from 09.00 until 04.30 Monday to Friday.

== See also ==
- Veterans UK
- The Royal British Legion
- SSAFA
- Army Benevolent Fund
- Royal Air Forces Association
- Mental health in the United Kingdom
