= Chris Harper (RAF officer) =

Royal Air Force Air Chief Marshal (born 1957)

Sir Christopher Harper
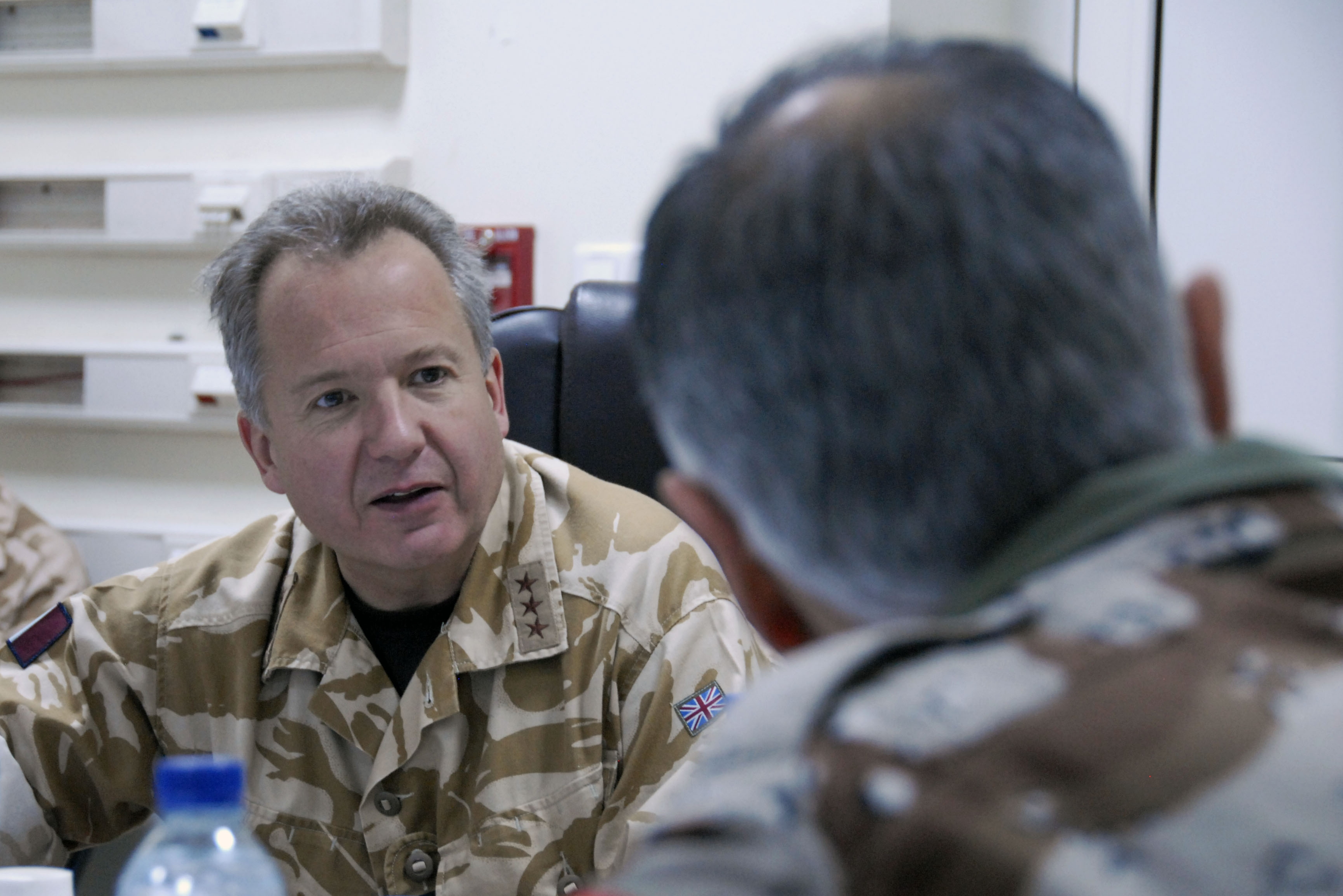
- Air Marshal Harper in Kabul, November 2009
- Born: 25 March 1957 (age 69)
- Military career
- Allegiance: United Kingdom
- Branch: Royal Air Force
- Service years: 1976–2017
- Rank: Air Marshal
- Commands: No. 1 Group (2007–09); RAF Coltishall (1999–01); No. 41(F) Squadron (1994–97)
- Conflicts: Operation Deny Flight; Operation Northern Watch
- Awards: Knight Commander of the Order of the British Empire; Mentioned in Despatches
- Other work: Honorary Air Commodore, No. 2620 (County of Norfolk) Squadron (2017–)

Air Marshal Sir Christopher Nigel Harper, KBE (born 25 March 1957) is a senior Royal Air Force officer, who served as the UK Military Representative to NATO and the European Union from 2011 to 2013 and as Director General of the NATO International Military Staff from 2013 to 2016. He was previously Deputy Commander Allied Joint Force Command at Brunssum in the Netherlands (2009–11), and Air Officer Commanding No. 1 Group in the UK (2007–09).

== Education and personal ==
Harper was educated at Alleyn's School in Dulwich and King's College London (MA, Defence Studies). He is married with one son and enjoys flying, shooting, running, riding motorcycles and gastronomy.

== Career ==
Harper was commissioned as an acting pilot officer after winning the Sword of Honour at Initial Officer Training in 1976; he regraded to pilot officer the following year. He was promoted to flying officer in 1978; and posted to 41(F) Squadron in 1979 for his first tour on the SEPECAT Jaguar. Promoted to flight lieutenant in 1982, he served as a Qualified Weapons Instructor on the Jaguar with No. 31 and No. 14 Squadrons before an exchange tour with the Canadian Air Force flying the McDonnell Douglas CF-18 Hornet. He was promoted to squadron leader in 1986, and gained a Master of Arts in Defence Studies from King's College London in 1993. Promoted to wing commander in 1993, he returned to command No. 41(F) Squadron between 1994 and 1997; he was actively involved in operations over Bosnia during this period. Having been promoted to group captain at the end of this tour, he maintained his connection with the Jaguar force by returning to RAF Coltishall from 1999 to 2001 as Station Commander and Jaguar Force Commander. Throughout this period the Jaguar Force was involved in operations over Iraq. Harper was appointed a Commander of the Order of the British Empire in the 2002 New Year Honours List and later that year was Mentioned in Despatches for action while over Northern Iraq.

Promoted to air commodore in 2002, Harper served as Air Commodore Typhoon at No. 1 Group, before becoming the first Director of Joint Commitments at the Ministry of Defence in 2004. Following promotion to air vice marshal in 2005, he was appointed Chief of Staff Operations at what became RAF Air Command. In 2007 he returned to No. 1 Group as Air Officer Commanding, following which he was promoted to air marshal and appointed Deputy Commander, NATO Allied Joint Force Command, Brunssum in March 2009.

Harper was appointed the UK Military Representative to NATO and the EU in March 2011 and promoted to Knight Commander of the Order of the British Empire in June 2011. He was elected to be the Director-General of the International Military Staff at NATO Headquarters in Brussels on 24 July 2013. He handed over his command of the International Military Staff to Lieutenant General Jan Broeks in July 2016.

In 2002, Harper became Honorary President of No 1475 (Dulwich) Squadron Air Training Corps based in South East London. Following his retirement from the RAF in 2017, Air Mshl Harper became the Honorary Air Commodore of No 2620 (County of Norfolk) Squadron, Royal Auxiliary Air Force, based at RAF Marham, he was made a Non-Resident Senior fellow of the Atlantic Council of the United States of America in the same year. He was appointed in 2018 as a Trustee of the Air League and subsequently became the organisation's President in December 2020. In 2019 he was elected a Fellow of the Royal Aeronautical Society (FRAeS); he serves as a Committee member of the Society's Air Power Group. He is a member of the Munich Security Conference’s Innovation Board, the Euro-Atlantic Security Leadership Group and the Alphen Group. Harper is the founder and managing director of CH4C Global Ltd, a small independent company that provides bespoke consultancy services to organisations working in international defence, security, aviation, aerospace, Space and technology.

Military offices
New title	Chief of Staff Operations; 2005–2007	Succeeded by Nigel Maddox as Chief of Staff Operations, Air Command
Preceded by David Walker	Air Officer Commanding No. 1 Group; 2007–2009	Succeeded by Greg Bagwell
Preceded by Chris Moran	Deputy Commander, Allied Joint Force Command Brunssum; 2009–2011	Succeeded by David Walker
Preceded by Sir David Bill	UK Military Representative to NATO; 2011–2013	Succeeded by Ian Corder
