= Sue Gray (RAF officer) =

Royal Air Force Air Marshal (born 1963)

Air Marshal Dame Sue Gray DBE CB FREng FIET
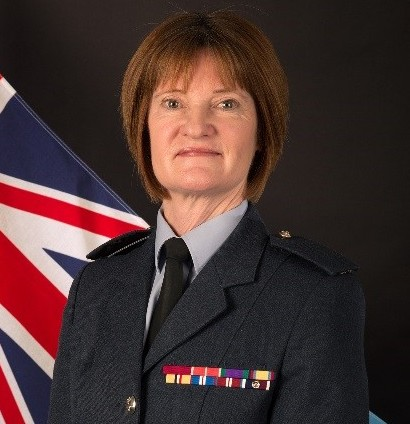
- Gray in 2019
- Born: Susan Catherine Jessop; 21 October 1963 (age 62)
- Military career
- Allegiance: United Kingdom
- Branch: Royal Air Force
- Service years: 1985–2022
- Rank: Air Marshal
- Commands: No. 38 Group (2016–2018)
- Conflicts: Gulf War; Iraq War
- Awards: Dame Commander of the Order of the British Empire; Companion of the Order of the Bath

Air Marshal Dame Susan Catherine Gray, DBE, CB, FREng, FIET (née Jessop; born 21 October 1963) is a former senior Royal Air Force officer. She served as Director of Combat Air at Defence Equipment and Support in the Ministry of Defence (2014–16), as Air Officer Commanding No. 38 Group (2016–18), and as Director-General of the Defence Safety Authority (2019–22). She is one of the most senior female officers ever to serve in the Royal Air Force.

== Early life and education ==
Gray was born on 21 October 1963. She studied electronics at Newcastle Polytechnic (now the Northumbria University), graduating with a Bachelor of Science degree.

== Military career ==
Gray joined the Engineer Branch of the Women's Royal Air Force (WRAF) in 1985. She was promoted to flying officer on 18 February 1986, and to flight lieutenant on 18 February 1989. In 1991, she was deployed with the Support Helicopter Force to Iraq as part of the Gulf War. On 15 June 1992, she moved from a Short Service Commission to a Permanent Commission, and therefore extended her service time to retirement age.

In 1994, the Women's Royal Air Force merged into the previously all-male Royal Air Force (RAF). Since then, Gray served in the RAF. On 1 July 1994, as part of the half-yearly promotions, she was promoted to squadron leader. On 1 January 2001, as part of the half-yearly promotions, she was promoted to wing commander. In 2003, she was once more deployed to Iraq, this time as part of Operation Telic (the Iraq War) and served as Chief Engineer for the Joint Helicopter Force.

=== Air officer ===
Gray was appointed Officer of the Order of the British Empire (OBE) in the 2005 New Year Honours and, on 1 January, as part of the half-yearly promotions, she was promoted to air commodore.

On 29 January 2014, Gray was promoted to air vice-marshal and appointed Director of Combat Air at Defence Equipment and Support in the Ministry of Defence.

In that role she was "responsible for the procurement and maintenance of all combat aircraft, training aircraft and remotely-piloted air systems for the armed forces". She is the second female officer to be promoted to non-honorary two-star rank (major general in the British Army, rear admiral in the Royal Navy or air vice marshal in the Royal Air Force) in the British Armed Forces since the Second World War; the first was Elaine West who had been promoted to air vice-marshal in August 2013. In February 2016, it was announced that she would be the next Air Officer Commanding No. 38 Group. She took up the appointment on 16 June 2016 in succession to Tim Bishop.

Gray was appointed Companion of the Order of the Bath (CB) in the 2017 New Year Honours, and was elected a Fellow of the Royal Academy of Engineering. She has also been made a Fellow of the Institution of Engineering and Technology. She handed over command of No. 38 Group to Air Commodore Simon Ellard in December 2018.

On 20 February 2019, it was announced that Gray had been promoted to air marshal, and thus became Britain's first ever female three-star officer; she thereby became the most senior female officer in the British Armed Forces. Between March 2019, and January 2022, she was the Director General of the Defence Safety Authority. She was appointed Dame Commander of the Order of the British Empire (DBE) in the 2022 New Year Honours. Gray retired in May 2022.

Gray is a recipient of three campaign medals; the General Service Medal, the Gulf Medal, and the Iraq Medal. She is also a recipient of the Queen Elizabeth II Golden Jubilee Medal and the Queen Elizabeth II Diamond Jubilee Medal.

Military offices
Preceded by Tim Bishop	Air Officer Commanding No. 38 Group; 2016–2018	Succeeded by Simon Ellard
Preceded by Richard Felton	Director-General Defence Safety Authority; 2019–2022	Succeeded by Stephen Shell
