= James Gildea =

British Army Militia officer and philanthropist

Colonel Sir James Gildea GBE KCVO CB KStJ
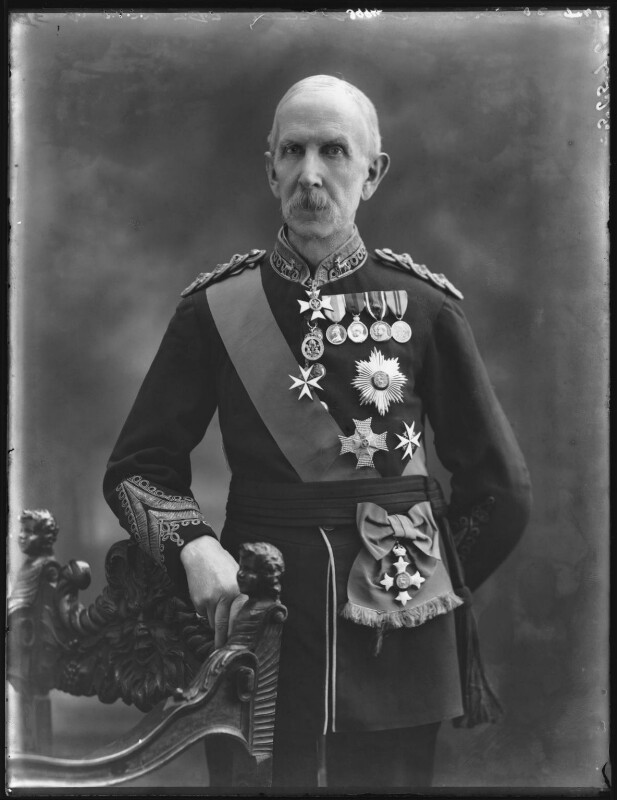
- Sir James Gildea, 17 June 1920

Chairman of the Soldiers', Sailors' and Airmen's Families Association
- In office 1919–1920

Chairman of the Soldiers' and Sailors' Families Association
- In office 1885–1919

Personal details
- Born: 23 June 1838 Kilmaine, County Mayo, Ireland
- Died: 6 November 1920 (aged 82)
- Known for: Founder of the Soldiers', Sailors' and Airmen's Families Association

Sir James Gildea (23 June 1838 – 6 November 1920) was a British Army Militia officer and philanthropist who founded the Soldiers', Sailors' and Airmen's Families Association.

Gildea was born in Kilmaine, County Mayo, Ireland. His father was the Provost of Tuam. He was educated at St Columba's College, Dublin, and Pembroke College, Cambridge. During the Franco-Prussian War he worked for the National Society for Aid to the Sick and Wounded in War and he later raised money for the families of those killed in the Zulu War of 1879 and the Second Afghan War of 1880.

In 1885, he founded the Soldiers' and Sailors' Families Association, which became the Soldiers', Sailors' and Airmen's Families Association in 1919, and served as its chairman and treasurer until his death.

From 1890 to 1895 he was organising secretary of Queen Victoria's Jubilee Institute for Nurses. He founded the Royal Homes for Officers' Widows and Daughters at Wimbledon in 1899 and was also at one time treasurer of the St. John Ambulance Association.

From 1890 to 1898, Gildea commanded the 6th (Militia) Battalion, Royal Warwickshire Regiment.

He was appointed Companion of the Order of the Bath (CB) in the 1898 New Year Honours list, and Commander of the Royal Victorian Order (CVO) in 1901. Knighted in December 1902, he was later appointed Knight Commander of the Royal Victorian Order (KCVO), and in the 1920 civilian war honours was appointed Knight Grand Cross of the Order of the British Empire (GBE).
