= RNRMC =

- Abbreviation: RNRMC
- Formation: 2007
- Registration no.: 1117794
- Legal status: Non-profit organisation
- Purpose: Supporting our sailors, marines, and their families, for life
- Location: Building 37, HMS Excellent, Whale Island, Portsmouth, Hampshire, PO2 8ER
- Region served: United Kingdom
- Patron: The Princess Royal
- CEO: Sam Nicolson
- President: Admiral Sir Jonathon Band
- Key people: The Princess Royal (Patron); Admiral Sir Jonathon Band (President); Sam Nicolson (Chief Executive); Dr Brian Gilvary (Chairman)
- Main organ: Board of Trustees
- Website: www.rnrmc.org.uk

RNRMC (full name Royal Navy and Royal Marines Charity) is a charity registered in England, Wales and Scotland. Its purpose is to support sailors, marines, and their families, including those from the Royal Navy, Royal Marines, Maritime Reserves, QARNNS (Queen Alexandra's Royal Naval Nursing Service), the Royal Fleet Auxiliary and former members of the now defunct Women's Royal Naval Service.

The Royal Navy and Royal Marines Charity is a member of the Maritime Charities Funding Group (MCFG) and the Confederation of Service Charities (COBSEO).

== History ==
RNRMC was established in 2007 as the National Charity of the Royal Navy, to fund projects and facilities that support serving personnel and veterans of the Naval service, as well as their families. HMS Queen Elizabeth is the affiliate ship of the charity.

In September 2018, Adrian Bell was appointed CEO of RNRMC, after having been CEO of the Kent, Surrey and Sussex Air Ambulance for eight years. In July 2021, Sir Bill Thomas was succeeded as chairman by Dr Brian Gilvary, the former Executive Chairman of Ineos Energy.

== Activity ==
RNRMC distributes grants to British military charities including Walking with the Wounded, SSAFA, Scotty's Little Soldiers and Combat Stress, allowing these charities to provide support to beneficiaries who have served in the Royal Navy or Royal Marines, and their family members. In the first decade of the charity's activity, it distributed over £50 million in grants.

The charity hosts multiple events to raise funds for its work, including an annual Beating Retreat performance, a virtual Trafalgar Night celebration, and sponsored sports challenges such as the Virtual Field Gun Challenge and Battlefield Cycle Challenge.

During the coronavirus pandemic, RNRMC distributed care packages to 650 Naval personnel.
