= United States Navy aircraft mishap board =

A United States Navy aircraft mishap board is an ad hoc or permanent panel assembled following an aircraft crash or accident and charged with the investigation of the causes of the incident and making recommendation for prevention of future incidents.

Aircraft mishap boards are typically composed of a minimum of four commissioned officers who were uninvolved in the incident, including a flight surgeon, a pilot rated on the type of aircraft involved in the incident, and at least two additional officers, one of whom is "well-qualified in aircraft operations" and one of whom is "well-qualified in aircraft maintenance". The board conducts investigations by interviewing witnesses to the incident, reviewing readings from the aircraft's surviving instruments, examining maintenance records of the aircraft, viewing the incident site, and examining any wreckage created. Foreign military officers seconded to the United States Navy may serve on an aircraft mishap board other than in the position of senior board officer.

While many aircraft mishap boards are organized following a mishap, each U.S. Navy squadron has a standing aircraft mishap board.

== See also ==
- Bureau enquêtes accidents pour la sécurité de l'aéronautique d'État - The French agency that investigates accidents and incidents to military and state aircraft
- Committee for Investigation of National Aviation Accidents - The Polish agency that investigates accidents and incidents to military and state aircraft
- Defence Safety Authority, which includes the Defence Accident Investigation Branch (DAIB), a British agency which investigates accidents to state and military aircraft
