= Peter J. M. Squires =

Royal Air Force senior officer (born 1968)

Air Vice-Marshal His Excellency Peter Squires OBE ADC
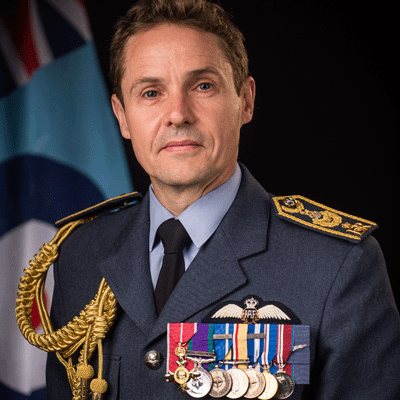
- Squires' official portrait (as Air Commodore)
- Born: 1968 (age 57–58)
- Military career
- Allegiance: Monarch of the United Kingdom
- Branch: Royal Air Force
- Service years: 1989–present
- Rank: Air Vice-Marshal
- Commands: British Forces Cyprus; Royal Air Force College Cranwell; 906 Expeditionary Air Wing; No. 100 Squadron RAF; Military Aviation Authority
- Conflicts: The Troubles; Iraqi no-fly zones conflict; Operation Bolton; Iraq War; 2011 military intervention in Libya; Operation Ellamy; Operation Unified Protector
- Awards: Queen's Commendation for Valuable Service in the Air

Air Vice-Marshal Peter James Murray Squires, OBE, ADC (born 1968) is a senior Royal Air Force officer, who is current director of the Military Aviation Authority (MAA) since March 2025. Previously, Squires served as the administrator of the Sovereign Base Areas of Akrotiri and Dhekelia and commander of British Forces Cyprus from 2022 until March 2025. From August 2016 to October 2019 he served as commandant of RAF College Cranwell. A Harrier II pilot until the aircraft type's premature retirement from British military service, he then served as commander of No. 100 Squadron RAF, flying BAE Systems Hawks.

== Early life and education ==
Squires was born in 1968 in the United Kingdom. From 1975 to 1986, he was educated at Warwick School, an all-boys public school in Warwick. He learned to fly at Wellesbourne Mountford Airfield, passing his junior flying test at the age of sixteen. He received a RAF sixth form scholarship, alongside David Petley, the Vice-Chancellor of Nottingham Trent University, since 2025.

Having received a RAF bursary, he studied aeronautics and astronautics at the University of Southampton, graduating with a Bachelor of Engineering (BEng) degree in 1989. He later undertook a Master of Arts (MA) degree in defence studies, which he completed in 2006.

== RAF career ==
On 1 October 1989, Squires was granted a short service commission in the General Duties Branch of the Royal Air Force (RAF). On 1 April 1990, he was promoted to flying officer, with seniority in that rank from 1 October 1988. He was promoted to flight lieutenant on 1 April 1992. After completing elementary flying training, he was subsequently streamed for fast-jet training. In 1995, he completed the Qualified Weapons Instructor course. Squires transferred to a permanent commission in the Royal Air Force on 2 May 1997. Flying Harrier IIs, in the same year he took part in the No. 1 Squadron RAF display, before in 1998 he deployed for five months in Operation Bolton. He was promoted to squadron leader on 1 July 1999.

Having been promoted to wing commander on 1 January 2005, Squires served as Wing Commander Joint Combat Aircraft Requirements' Manager, before attending the Advanced Command and Staff Course to study for a master's degree in Defence Studies. He then joined 3rd (United Kingdom) Division, commanding the Divisional Air Cell and serving as the senior air advisor to the general officer commanding the division. He deployed with the division in the Iraq War in 2008 as Chief Air Plans for the Multi-National Division (South-East).

From April 2009 to April 2011, Squires commanded No. 100 Squadron RAF, a Hawk squadron based at RAF Leeming. He was commanding officer of the 906 Expeditionary Air Wing during Operation Unified Protector, the NATO-enforced no-fly zone over Libya, from June 2011. He left the command towards the end of the year. He was promoted to group captain on 1 January 2012 and, in the 2012 New Year Honours, was appointed an Officer of the Order of the British Empire for his services with No. 100 Squadron. In the Spring, he was appointed Director of Defences Studies for the RAF.

It was announced in December 2015 that Squires would be the next commandant of Royal Air Force College Cranwell. He then studied at Royal College of Defence Studies to prepare for the command. In August 2016, he succeeded Chris Luck as commandant, and was also made an aide-de-camp to Queen Elizabeth II. In October 2019 he left Cranwell to take up the post of Head Defence Operational Capability in the Ministry of Defence.

Squires was promoted to air vice-marshal on 1 September 2022, when he was appointed commander of British Forces Cyprus and administrator of the Sovereign Base Areas. He took up the appointment of director of the Military Aviation Authority in March 2025.

== Personal life ==
Squires is married and has three children.

Military offices
Preceded by Chris Luck	Commandant of Royal Air Force College Cranwell; 2016–2019	Succeeded by Suraya Marshall
Preceded by Robert Thomson	Commander British Forces Cyprus; 2022–2025	Succeeded by Tom Bewick
Preceded by Alan Gillespie	Director Military Aviation Authority; 2025–present	Succeeded by incumbent
