= Bureau enquêtes accidents pour la sécurité de l'aéronautique d'État =

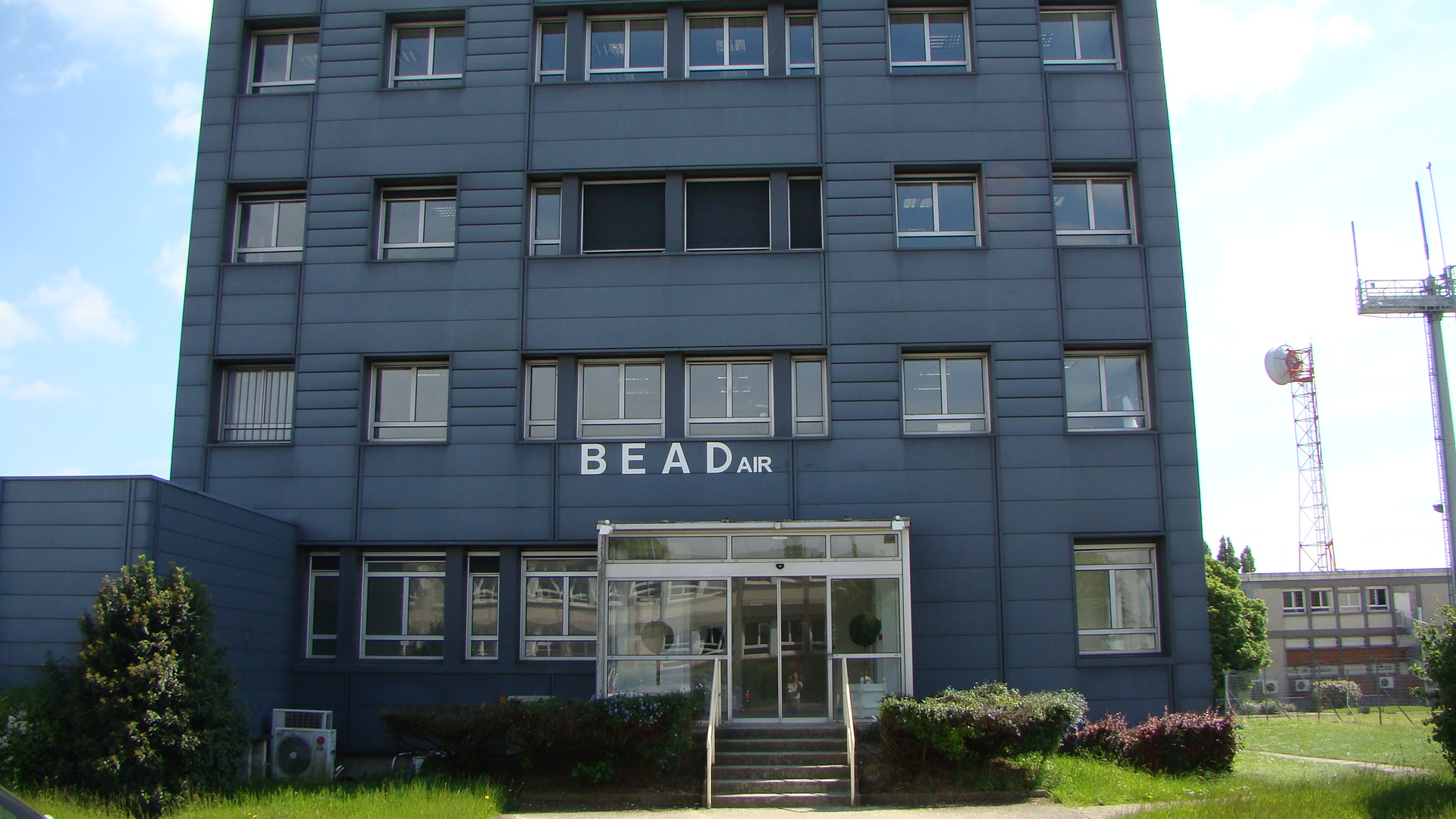
Head office of the organisation (then called BEAD-air)

Bureau enquêtes accidents pour la sécurité de l'aéronautique d'État (BEA-É), formerly the Bureau enquêtes accidents défense (BEA Défense or BEAD) and Bureau enquêtes accidents défense air (BEAD-air), is an agency of the French Ministry of Defence. It investigates aviation accidents and incidents occurring on government and military aircraft. The head office is on Vélizy-Villacoublay Air Base (Base 107), in the area around Vélizy-Villacoublay, Yvelines, in the Paris metropolitan area.

It is intended to operate separately and independently from other French government agencies. It is distinct from the Bureau of Enquiry and Analysis for Civil Aviation Safety (BEA), a part of the French Ministry of Transport which investigates accidents and incidents to civilian aircraft.

The Bureau enquêtes accidents défense mer (BEAD-mer) is the equivalent agency for investigating accidents and incidents on government and military sea transport, and the Bureau enquêtes accidents défense de transport terrestre (BEAD-TT) is the equivalent agency for such involving land transport.

== History ==
It was created on 1 January 2002. It was based at Brétigny-sur-Orge Air Base (Base 217). On 1 January 2003 the BEAD began operations. It changed its name in 2005 when similar agencies were created to investigate accidents and incidents on other modes of military transport. It adopted its current name on 9 May 2018.

== See also ==
- Committee for Investigation of National Aviation Accidents - The Polish equivalent of the BEA-É
- Defence Safety Authority, which includes the Defence Accident Investigation Branch (DAIB), which functions as the British equivalent of the BEA-É, BEAD-mer, and BEAD-TT in one
- United States Navy aircraft mishap board
- List of accidents and incidents involving military aircraft
