= State Commission on Maritime Accident Investigation =

Polish government agency

The State Commission on Maritime Accident Investigation (Państwowa Komisja Badania Wypadków Morskich, PKBWM) is an agency of the Polish government that investigates maritime accidents. It is headquartered in Warsaw.

It was established in accordance with the 23 April 2009 European Parliament and Council Directive 2009/18/EC.

== See also ==
- State Commission on Aircraft Accidents Investigation
- Committee for Investigation of National Aviation Accidents
