= Alan Gillespie =

British Royal Air Force officer

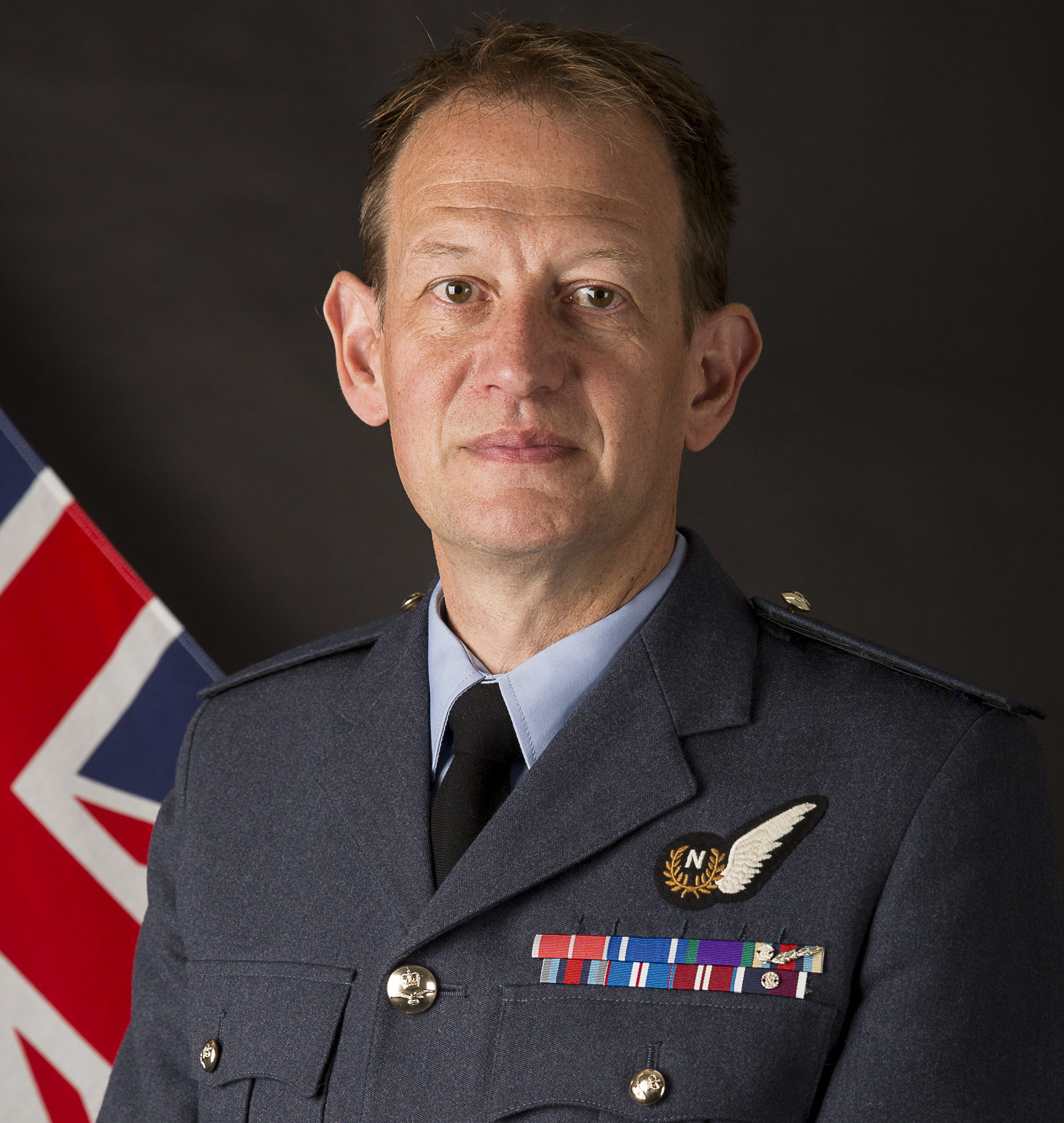
- Air Marshal Gillespie in 2019
- Military career
- Allegiance: United Kingdom
- Branch: Royal Air Force
- Service years: 1988–
- Rank: Air Marshal
- Commands: No. 23 Squadron; No. 903 Expeditionary Air Wing; RAF Waddington; No. 83 Expeditionary Air Group; No. 2 Group; Military Aviation Authority; Defence Safety Authority
- Conflicts: Iraq War; War in Afghanistan
- Awards: Commander of the Order of the British Empire

Air Marshal Alan Kenneth Gillespie CBE is a senior Royal Air Force officer. He currently serves as the Director General of the Defence Safety Authority.

== RAF career ==
Gillespie was commissioned into the Royal Air Force in 1988. He became commanding officer of No. 23 Squadron in 2008, commander No. 903 Expeditionary Air Wing at Camp Bastion in Afghanistan in 2009 and station commander RAF Waddington in 2011.

Gillespie went on to become UK Air Component Commander at Al Udeid Air Base in Qatar and Air Officer Commanding No. 83 Expeditionary Air Group in 2013, the Battlespace Management Force Commander in 2015 and Head of the Air Transformation Programme in 2017. He was appointed Air Officer Commanding No. 2 Group in September 2019, and subsequently as Director of the Military Aviation Authority in December 2021.

He succeeded Steve Shell as Director General of the Defence Safety Authority and was promoted to air marshal in November 2024.

He was appointed a Commander of the Order of the British Empire in the 2018 New Year Honours.

Military offices
Preceded by David Cooper	Air Officer Commanding No. 2 Group; 2019–2021	Succeeded by Suraya Marshall
Preceded by Steve Shell	Director-General Defence Safety Authority; 2024–present	Incumbent
