= Tim Anderson (RAF officer) =

Royal Air Force air marshal (born 1957)

Sir Tim Anderson
- Born: 2 February 1957 (age 69); Belfast, Northern Ireland
- Military career
- Allegiance: United Kingdom
- Branch: Royal Air Force
- Service years: 1979–2013
- Rank: Air marshal
- Nickname: Timo
- Commands: Military Aviation Authority (2010–13); Air Warfare Centre (2005–07); RAF Brüggen (2000–03); No. 14 Squadron RAF (1999–00)
- Conflicts: Operation Allied Force
- Awards: Knight Commander of the Order of the Bath; Companion of the Distinguished Service Order

Air Marshal Sir Timothy Michael Anderson, KCB, DSO (born 2 February 1957) is a retired senior Royal Air Force (RAF) officer. He served as the inaugural Director-General of the UK Military Aviation Authority (MAA) from 2010 to 2013. The MAA was established in response to the Haddon-Cave Review into the issues surrounding the loss of an RAF Nimrod over Afghanistan in September 2006. Earlier in his career, Anderson was a fast jet pilot, primarily flying the Tornado ground attack aircraft, and as Officer Commanding No. 14 Squadron led the United Kingdom's Tornado commitment to Operation Allied Force, the NATO air campaign over Kosovo in 1999, for which he was appointed a Companion of the Distinguished Service Order. He is currently Chairman of the UK Airspace Change Organising Group Steering Committee, overseeing a national infrastructure programme on behalf of the Secretary of State for Transport and the UK Civil Aviation Authority.

== Service career ==
Anderson was born in Belfast, Northern Ireland, and was educated at the Belfast Royal Academy and King's College London (MA). He was commissioned as an acting pilot officer in July 1979, being regraded to pilot officer in July 1980 following Initial Officer Training, and then promoted to flying officer in July 1981. He began his operational flying career in 1983 on the Tornado GR1 ground attack aircraft and served successively on front-line squadrons, including an exchange tour with the Royal Australian Air Force flying the F-111 Aardvark, and operational deployments to the Middle East; being promoted to flight lieutenant in July 1984, and squadron leader in July 1989.

In January 1997 Anderson was promoted to wing commander and, in 1999, as Officer Commanding No. 14 Squadron, Anderson led the RAF Tornado GR1 Force commitment to the NATO Operation Allied Force over Kosovo and the former Republic of Yugoslavia, for which he was appointed a Companion of the Distinguished Service Order. Promotion to group captain in July 2000 was accompanied by appointment as the Station Commander of RAF Brüggen in Germany, the largest Tornado base in NATO, in which role he oversaw the closure of the RAF's last overseas Main Operating Base and the return of its personnel and equipment to the United Kingdom.

In September 2003 Anderson was appointed as Head of Deep Theatre Attack Capability, a 1-star appointment at the Ministry of Defence responsible for the UK's F-35 Lightning II combat aircraft acquisition programme, his substantive promotion to air commodore following in July of the following year. After the Higher Command and Staff Course in 2005, he was appointed Commandant of the UK Air Warfare Centre (and Assistant Chief of Staff – Intelligence at Strike Command) in August of that year. In March 2007 Anderson was promoted to air vice-marshal, moving to the Ministry of Defence as Assistant Chief of the Air Staff. In the 2009 Birthday Honours, he was appointed a Companion of the Order of the Bath and, in 2010, was the recipient of the Curtis Sword, awarded by Aviation Week and Space Technology for leadership and cooperation in transatlantic relations.

Anderson was promoted to air marshal in April 2010, his initially announced appointment being as Deputy Commander-in-Chief (Operations) at Air Command. However, this appointment was subsequently cancelled in order for him to be appointed the first Director-General of the new Military Aviation Authority, the world's first independent, fully integrated organisation, responsible for regulating and assuring operational and technical air safety within the UK military.

Anderson was advanced to Knight Commander of the Order of the Bath in the 2013 New Year Honours.

== Commercial career ==
After leaving the RAF, Anderson established a strategic leadership and business consultancy working with a number of blue-chip international clients in Europe, the Middle East and the US. In May 2014, Anderson was appointed to the board of Flybe, Europe's largest regional airline, as a non-executive director and chairman of the company's Safety and Security Review Board. In June 2018, Anderson stepped down from the Flybe board in order to assume the executive role of Chief Operating Officer with responsibility for running the airline operation, the training academy and overseeing maintenance support whilst the company was prepared for sale. Following the successful sale of the company to Connect Airways in February 2018, Anderson resigned from the Flybe group in September 2019 in order to take up the role of Chairman of the Department for Transport and CAA-sponsored Airspace Change Organising Group Steering Committee. The ACOG is responsible for coordinating a £150M national infrastructure programme to redesign the UK's national airspace structures, involving all major UK airports and hundreds of Airspace Change Proposals over a 10-year period. Anderson is currently also a strategic adviser to National Air Traffic Services. He is a member of the advisory board for ZeroAvia, a US/UK company developing the world's first practical zero emission aviation powertrain, and chairs ZeroAvia's Safety and Security Review Board.

== Personal ==
Anderson is an ex-President of the Royal Air Force Rugby Union and Hon. President of the Northern Ireland Wing of the Air Training Corps. He is a Vice Patron of the Royal Air Force Charitable Trust and Honorary Air Commodore of No 622 Squadron Royal Auxiliary Air Force. In 2013 he was appointed a life Fellow of the Royal Aeronautical Society and in July 2016 was made a Doctor of Science (h.c) by Cranfield University in recognition of his contribution to the Defence and Security sector.

Anderson is married with two adult daughters. His interests include cycling, beekeeping, motor racing, leisure flying and cooking.

Military offices
Unknown	Commandant Air Warfare Centre; 2005–2007	Succeeded by J Stinton
Preceded by Chris Moran	Assistant Chief of the Air Staff; 2007–2010	Succeeded by Barry North
New title	Director-General, Military Aviation Authority; 2010–2013	Succeeded by Barry North
