= Chris Moran (RAF officer) =

English Royal Air Force officer (1956–2010)

Sir Christopher Moran
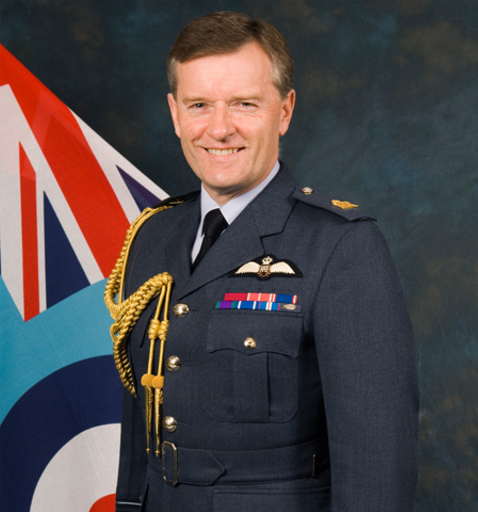
- Air Chief Marshal Moran
- Born: Christopher Hugh Moran; 28 April 1956; Urmston, Lancashire
- Died: 26 May 2010 (aged 54); John Radcliffe Hospital, Oxford
- Spouse: Elizabeth Jane Goodwin (m. 1980–2010)
- Military career
- Allegiance: United Kingdom
- Branch: Royal Air Force
- Service years: 1977–2010
- Rank: Air Chief Marshal
- Commands: Air Command (2009–10); No. 1 Group (2003–05); RAF Wittering (1997–99); No. IV Squadron (1994–96)
- Conflicts: Operation Deliberate Force
- Awards: Knight Commander of the Order of the Bath; Officer of the Order of the British Empire; Member of the Royal Victorian Order; Queen's Commendation for Valuable Service in the Air

Air Chief Marshal Sir Christopher Hugh Moran, KCB, OBE, MVO, ADC, FRAeS (28 April 1956 – 26 May 2010) was a fast jet pilot and later a senior commander in the Royal Air Force. He was Commander-in-Chief of Air Command at the time of his unexpected death.

== Early and family life ==
Moran was born in Urmston, Lancashire, and educated at Bishop Ullathorne School in Coventry in the late sixties and early seventies before attending the University of Manchester Institute of Science and Technology to study mechanical engineering. In 1974, whilst studying at university, Moran became a university cadet in the Royal Air Force. He was commissioned an acting pilot officer on 16 December of that year, together with Stuart Peach, who also achieved the rank of air chief marshal.

Moran graduated from UMIST in 1977 with a Bachelor of Science and went to RAF College Cranwell for his initial training with the RAF. He was regraded as a pilot officer on 15 July 1977, and was successively promoted to flying officer (15 January 1978) and to flight lieutenant (15 October 1978). He was later to earn a Master of Arts from King's College London. In 1980 he married Elizabeth Jane Goodwin.

== Military career ==
After completing pilot training, Moran converted onto the Harrier with No. 233 Operational Conversion Unit. In 1980 Moran entered productive service, flying Harriers with No. IV Squadron. In 1983 he returned to No. 233 Operational Conversion Unit, attending a weapons instructors' course before returning to No. IV Squadron as a Qualified Weapons Instructor. Promoted to squadron leader in 1986, Moran was appointed as a flight commander on No. IV Squadron, serving in Belize, the Falkland Islands, and on HMS Illustrious. In 1985, he was also an exchange officer with the United States Marine Corps at Cherry Point, North Carolina.

Moran commanded the Harrier squadron in the Harrier Operational Conversion Unit at RAF Wittering, and then attended the Advanced Staff Course in 1991. In the New Year Honours that year he was awarded a Queen's Commendation for Valuable Service in the Air. After a brief posting to the Ministry of Defence he was appointed Equerry to Prince Philip, Duke of Edinburgh.

In 1994 Moran became the commanding officer of No. IV Squadron which was based in Germany. The same year Moran led his squadron to the Middle East for duties on Operation Warden which involved enforcing the no-fly zone over northern Iraq. In 1995 Moran and No. IV Squadron flew missions against the Bosnian Serbs as part of Operation Deliberate Force.

=== Senior appointments ===
Promoted to group captain in 1996, he was appointed Staff Officer HQ 1 Group, and in the following year, station commander of RAF Wittering. After attending the Higher Command and Staff Course in 1999 Moran became Divisional Director at the Joint Services Command and Staff College, where he also completed a Master of Arts. As an air commodore he was then Director of Air Staff until 2002, and then the Chief of Defence Staff's liaison officer to the US Joint Staff in Washington, D.C. In the following year he became Air Officer Commanding No. 1 Group as an air vice marshal. In 2005 he became Assistant Chief of Air Staff.

In 2005, Moran was appointed to the board of the Civil Aviation Authority.

He was promoted air marshal and became Deputy Commander Allied Joint Force Command Brunssum in May 2007, in succession to Lieutenant General David Judd. Air Chief Marshal Moran was appointed Commander-in-Chief of Air Command on 3 April 2009. Moran was appointed a Knight Commander of the Order of the Bath in the 2009 New Year Honours.

== Death ==
Moran's death was announced on the evening of 26 May 2010; he had collapsed following a triathlon at RAF Brize Norton that afternoon. He was taken to the John Radcliffe Hospital in Oxford by air ambulance, but was pronounced dead on arrival. Moran was survived by his wife Elizabeth, Lady Moran, two daughters and a son.

Military offices
Preceded by D A Haward	Officer Commanding No. IV Squadron; 1994–1996	Succeeded by A S Kirkpatrick
Preceded by J Connolly	Station Commander RAF Wittering; 1997–1999	Succeeded by A F P Dezonie
Preceded by Sir Glenn Torpy	Air Officer Commanding No. 1 Group; 2003–2005	Succeeded by David Walker
Preceded by David Walker	Assistant Chief of the Air Staff; 2005–2007	Succeeded by Tim Anderson
Preceded by David Judd	Deputy Commander Allied Joint Force Command Brunssum; 2007–2009	Succeeded by Chris Harper
Preceded by Sir Clive Loader	Commander-in-Chief RAF Air Command; 2009–2010	Succeeded by Simon Bryant
