= SSAFA =

Charity of the United Kingdom of Great Britain and Northern Ireland

SSAFA, the Armed Forces charity
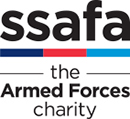
- Formation: 1885
- Founder: James Gildea
- Type: Charity; Veterans' organisation
- Headquarters: 4 St Dunstan's Hill; London; EC3R 8AD
- Location: United Kingdom
- Chair of the Council of Trustees: Simon Bollom KBE, CB, FREng
- Chief Executive: Steve Shell CB, OBE
- Website: www.ssafa.org.uk

SSAFA, the Armed Forces charity, also known as the Soldiers', Sailors', and Airmen's Families Association, is a UK charity that provides trusted support to serving men and women and veterans from the British Armed Forces and their families or dependents. Anyone who is currently serving or has ever served in the Royal Navy, British Army or Royal Air Force and their families, both regulars and reserves, is eligible for their help.

SSAFA’s professional staff and network of more than 3,400 volunteers assist more than 66,000 people every year, from World War II veterans to the families of young servicemen and women wounded or killed in Afghanistan.

Founded in 1885, SSAFA (SAFF-A) is the UK's oldest national tri-service Armed Forces charity.

== Clients ==
SSAFA offers help and support to all serving and former members of all ranks of the Armed Forces, including:

- Royal Navy, Royal Marines, Army and Royal Air Force
- Volunteer Reserve Forces, including Royal Navy Reserves, Royal Marine Reserves, Army Reserves and Royal Air Force Reserves
- Nursing services.

The following people are also eligible for SSAFA’s support:

- Wives and former wives
- Husbands and former husbands
- Widows and widowers
- Civil partners and former civil partners
- Partners who are, or were, in an established relationship with a Beneficiary
- Children who are dependent on a beneficiary
- Those who provide, or provided, care for a beneficiary.

== Welfare advice and support ==
SSAFA offer welfare advice and support for serving personnel, veterans and their families through a worldwide network of volunteers. Branches in local communities provide help for veterans and their families and committees on military bases help serving families.

=== For currently serving personnel and their families ===
==== Support in service communities ====
SSAFA has a network of volunteers on Army, RAF and Naval bases in the UK and around the world who give local support.

==== Housing for wounded, injured and sick serving personnel and their families ====
SSAFA's Norton House, Stanford Hall provides home-from-home accommodation for families visiting wounded injured or sick service or ex-service personnel and outpatients. SSAFA also provides day-to-day management of Fisher House UK at the Queen Elizabeth Hospital Birmingham (QEHB).

==== Mentoring for injured, wounded or sick service leavers ====
SSAFA’s mentoring scheme was set up in 2011 and supports those transitioning out of the Army or RAF due to medical discharge. SSAFA’s volunteer mentors provide support to wounded, injured and sick service leavers through a long-term 'one-to-one' relationship that underpins the transition from the military. SSAFA Mentoring is nationally accredited by the Mentoring and Befriending Foundation.

==== Adoption for military families ====
SSAFA was a registered adoption agency dedicated to helping military families through the adoption process. SSAFA no longer provides an adoption service, but any previous clients can still get support from the charity.

==== Additional needs and disabilities support ====
SSAFA provide specialised support to military families with additional needs including their Forces Additional Needs and Disability Forum (FANDF).

==== Short breaks for children and young people from forces families ====
SSAFA coordinates holidays and events that focus on offering new experiences and activities for children and young people from service families.

==== Stepping Stone Homes for women and their children with a service connection ====
Stepping Stone Homes provide short-term supported accommodation, help and advice during difficult times. Female serving or ex-service personnel, or the female spouses and partners of serving or ex-service personnel, along with their dependent children are all eligible to stay there.

==== Professional health care ====
SSAFA’s professional health care staff provide patient-focussed care to military families worldwide.

==== Personal support and social work for the RAF ====
Working alongside the RAF, but outside the Chain of Command, SSAFA staff provide support for RAF personnel and their families, both Regulars and Reserves.

==== Independent Service Custody Visiting ====
SSAFA provides independent oversight of Army Service Custody facilities.

=== Support available to veterans and their families ===
==== Housing advice ====
SSAFA offers practical housing advice and support to Armed Forces veterans and their dependents including guidance around housing benefits and accessing social housing.

==== Debt advice ====
SSAFA can help veterans to get advice on dealing with debt when they have fallen behind on their bills or repayments to credit cards and are struggling to get by or at risk of losing their home.

==== Mobility assistance ====
SSAFA volunteers seek financial assistance for veterans to help maintain mobility and independence at home. Trained volunteers can help veterans get mobility equipment such as Electronically Powered Vehicles or mobility scooters, stair lifts, riser and recliner chairs.

==== Providing household goods ====
SSAFA can provide veterans with essential household items, including white and brown goods.

==== Support for homeless veterans ====
SSAFA has a range of specialist services to support veterans who are homeless or facing homelessness.

==== Support for offenders and ex-offenders ====
SSAFA can provide support for:

- Families of veterans whilst they are in custody
- Veterans and their families on release
- Veterans whilst they are in custody.

==== Residential housing ====
St Vincent's Care Home at Ryde provides residential care for older ex-service personnel and their spouses.

The Royal Homes in Wimbledon provide accommodation where widows and daughters of those who used to serve can live independently.

==== Glasgow's Helping Heroes ====
'Glasgow's Helping Heroes' is a service provided by SSAFA in partnership with Glasgow City Council for current and former members of the armed forces and their dependants or carers who live, work or wish to relocate there. Its dedicated team works with national and local government and third sector providers to resolve clients' employment, housing, health, financial and/or social isolation issues.

=== Forcesline helpline ===
SSAFA also offers Forcesline, a free and confidential telephone helpline, live chat, and email service that provides support for both current and ex-servicemen and women from the Armed Forces and for their families.

== Locations ==
SSAFA provides support where it is needed in the UK and worldwide:

- The volunteer network reaches into every county of the UK and 13 countries around the world.
- Volunteers in more than 90 branches provide advice and support to veterans and their families living in local communities.
- Service Committees work on army garrisons, RAF stations and naval establishments with over 60 Committees across the UK and wherever the UK Armed Forces are based worldwide.

SSAFA health care and social work services support the Armed Forces community in 13 countries.

== Structure and governance ==
SSAFA is governed by a board of Trustees who make and approve SSAFA policy. They oversee the Chief Executive Steve Shell CB OBE and his Executive team who together look after to day-to-day management of the charity.

SSAFA Trustees are all volunteers who contribute their time and expertise to the management of SSAFA. They have ultimate responsibility for directing SSAFA's affairs and ensuring the charity is solvent, well-run and meet objectives.

All Trustees are also members of the Council and meet regularly to discuss the charity's activities and progress. The National Chair is Sir Simon Bollom KBE CB.

SSAFA’s charitable work is financed by contributions from benevolent funds, generous donations from members of the public and the profits generated by their Health and Social Care department who are contracted by the National Health Service and Ministry of Defence to provide direct support to serving personnel and their families in the UK and overseas.

== History ==
James Gildea founded the Soldiers' and Sailors' Families Association in 1885. In 1919, after the establishment of the Royal Air Force (in 1918), the organisation expanded support to become the Soldiers', Sailors', and Airmen's Families Association (SSAFA). In 1997, SSAFA Forces Help was established when two charities, the "Forces Help Society" and "SSAFA", merged. On 10 April 2013, the charity's name changed to SSAFA as part of a rebranding aimed at improving awareness of the organisation's work amongst members of the armed forces community.

== Cultural references ==
In Foyle's War series six, episode 3 ("All Clear"), Sam volunteers with SSAFA, at Foyle's suggestion.

In the 1960 British drama film Tunes of Glory, directed by Ronald Neame, there is a scene with John Mills involving a SSAFA charity collection.

1940s poster artwork commissioned by SSAFA from Fougasse (cartoonist) is now highly sought after by collectors.

== See also ==
- Army Benevolent Fund
- British Army
- Help for Heroes
- RAF Benevolent Fund
- Royal Air Force
- Royal Air Forces Association
- Royal Navy
- Royal Navy and Royal Marines Charity
- The Royal British Legion
