= Andrew Pulford =

Royal Air Force air marshal (born 1958)

Air Chief Marshal Sir Andrew Pulford GCB CBE
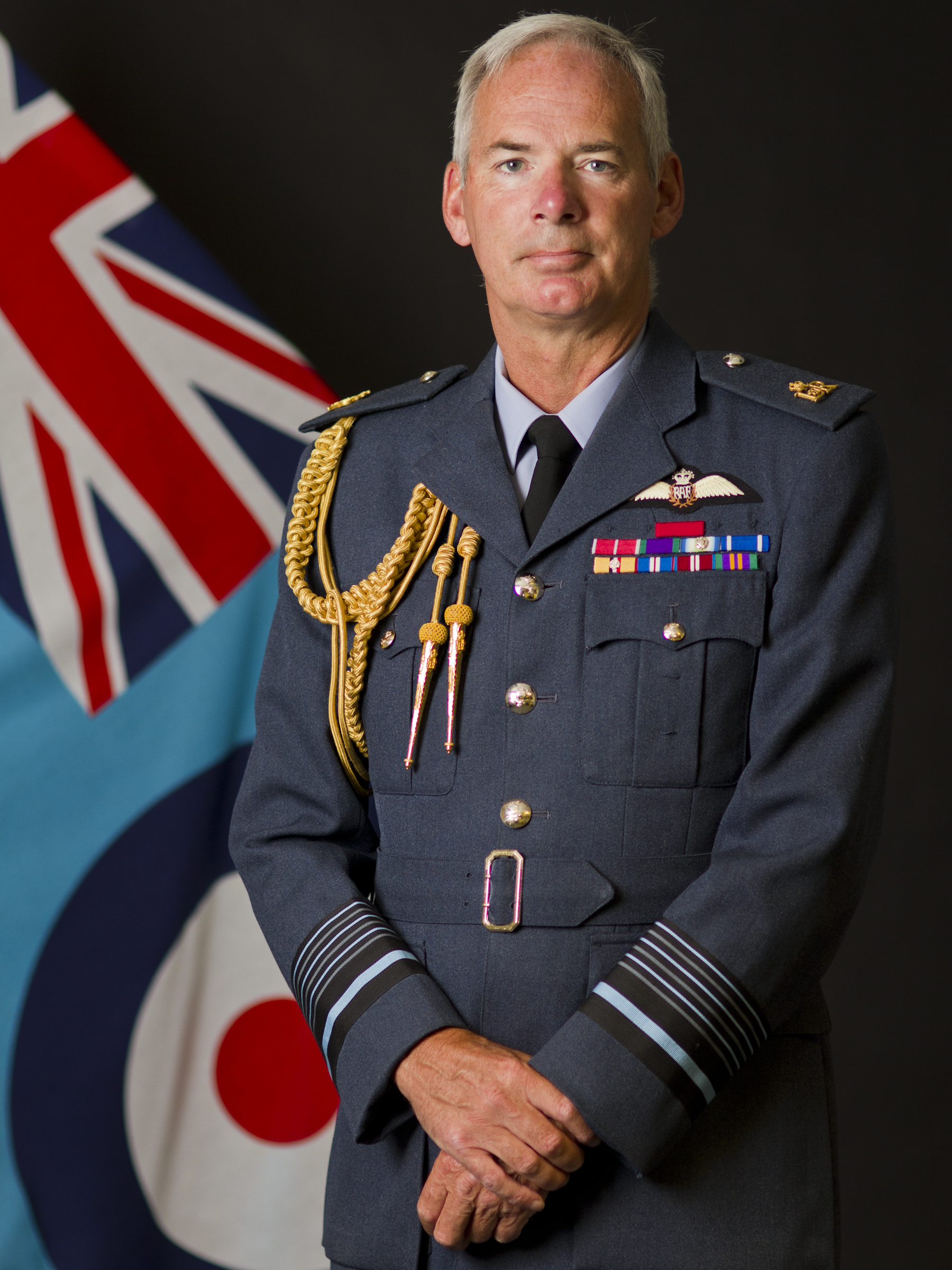
- Air Chief Marshal Sir Andrew Pulford c. 2013
- Born: 22 March 1958 (age 68)
- Military career
- Allegiance: United Kingdom
- Branch: Royal Air Force
- Service years: 1977–2016
- Rank: Air Chief Marshal
- Commands: Chief of the Air Staff (2013–16); Air Member for Personnel (2010–13); No. 2 Group (2007–08); RAF Odiham (2001–03); No. 18 Squadron (1996–98)
- Conflicts: Falklands War; Operation Banner; Iraq War; Operation Telic
- Awards: Knight Grand Cross of the Order of the Bath; Commander of the Order of the British Empire

Air Chief Marshal Sir Andrew Douglas Pulford, GCB, CBE (born 22 March 1958) is a retired senior Royal Air Force (RAF) commander. A helicopter pilot with operational service in Northern Ireland, the Falklands War and Iraq War, Pulford commanded RAF Odiham and No. 2 Group, and served as Assistant Chief of Defence Staff Operations, before taking up the post of Deputy Commander-in-Chief Personnel at Air Command and Air Member for Personnel in 2010. He became Chief of the Air Staff on 31 July 2013, retiring from the Royal Air Force on 12 July 2016.

== Early life ==
Born the son of Douglas and Jean Pulford, Pulford was educated at Magnus Grammar School in Newark.

== RAF career ==
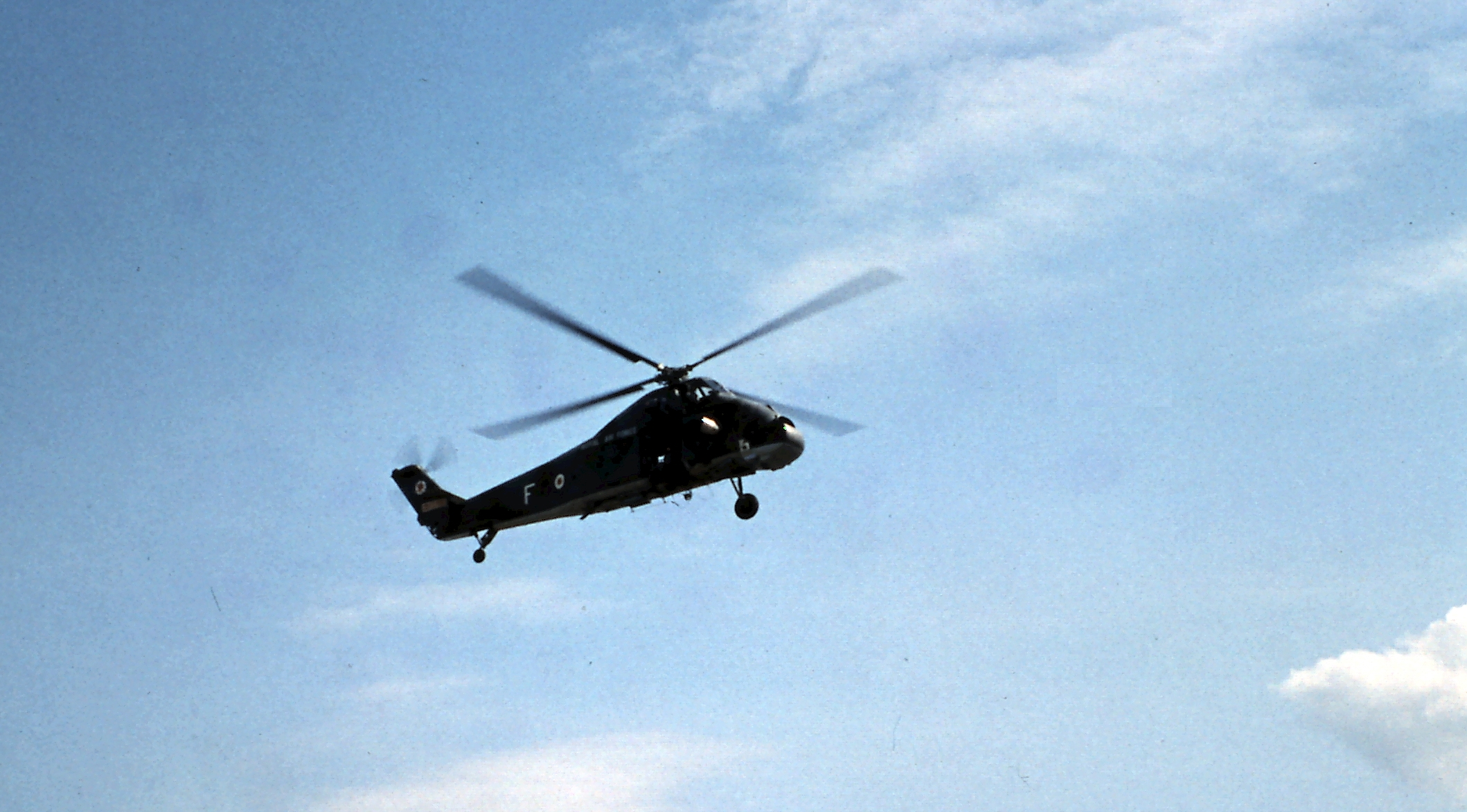
Westland Wessex, a helicopter type flown by Pulford in the late 1970s

Pulford joined the Royal Air Force as an acting pilot officer in January 1977, joining No. 72 Squadron, before spending many of his 5,000 flying hours piloting Chinooks with No. 18 Squadron from RAF Odiham. He was regraded to pilot officer in January 1978, and then promoted to flying officer in January 1979, and flight lieutenant in July 1981; seeing service in the Falklands War with C Flight on board RFA Tidespring, while on exchange service with the Royal Navy in 1982. He had an exchange tour with the Royal Australian Air Force between 1985 and 1987. Promoted squadron leader in January 1987, and to wing commander in January 1994, he became Officer Commanding No. 18 Squadron in 1996, and Principal Staff Officer to the Chief of the Air Staff in 1999.

Promoted to group captain in January 2000, Pulford took the Higher Command and Staff Course at Defence Academy of the United Kingdom, Shrivenham, in 2001, before becoming Station Commander at RAF Odiham in December 2001 and being deployed as Commander Joint Helicopter Force Headquarters for Operation Telic in Iraq. Appointed a Commander of the Order of the British Empire in the 2004 Birthday Honours, he was made Director Air Resources and Plans at the Ministry of Defence in August 2004 and, after being promoted to air commodore in January 2005, he became Air Officer Commanding No. 2 Group with the rank of air vice marshal in February 2007.

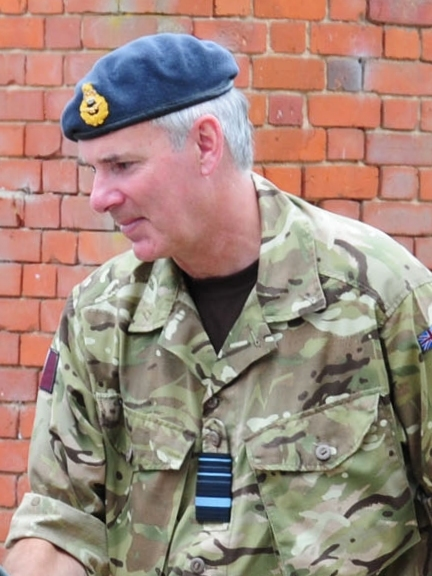
Air Marshal Pulford in RAF No.3 Dress (MTP)

Pulford then served as Assistant Chief of the Defence Staff (Operations) from September 2008, until his appointment as Deputy Commander-in-Chief (Personnel) at Air Command and Air Member for Personnel, based at RAF High Wycombe, with the rank of air marshal in September 2010.

Pulford was appointed a Knight Commander of the Order of the Bath in the 2013 New Year Honours. He was also promoted to air chief marshal on taking up the appointment of Chief of the Air Staff in July 2013, the first helicopter pilot ever to be professional head of the Royal Air Force. As of 2015, Pulford was paid a salary of between £175,000 and £179,999 by the department, making him one of the 328 most highly paid people in the British public sector at that time. He was appointed a Knight Grand Cross of the Order of the Bath (GCB) in the 2016 New Year Honours. Pulford received his GCB at a joint investiture ceremony at Windsor Castle along with former First Sea Lord, Admiral Sir George Zambellas, on 13 April 2016.

== Personal life ==
In 1982, Pulford married Nicola Jane Pearse; they have a son and a daughter. Pulford's interests include military history, motorcycling, old cars and sailing.

Military offices
Preceded by Kevin Leeson	Director Air Resources and Plans; 2004–2007	Succeeded by Barry North
Preceded by Iain McNicoll	Air Officer Commanding No. 2 Group RAF; 2007–2008	Succeeded by Stephen Hillier
Preceded by Chris Nickols	Assistant Chief of the Defence Staff (Operations); 2008–2010	Succeeded by David Capewell
Preceded by Simon Bryant	Deputy Commander-in-Chief Personnel RAF Air Command; Air Member for Personnel; 2010–2013	Succeeded by Barry North
Preceded by Sir Stephen Dalton	Chief of the Air Staff; 2013–2016	Succeeded by Sir Stephen Hillier
