= State Commission on Aircraft Accidents Investigation =

Państwowa Komisja Badania Wypadków Lotniczych - State Commission on Aircraft Accidents Investigation
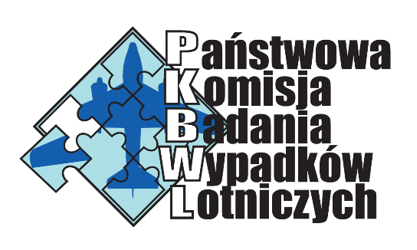

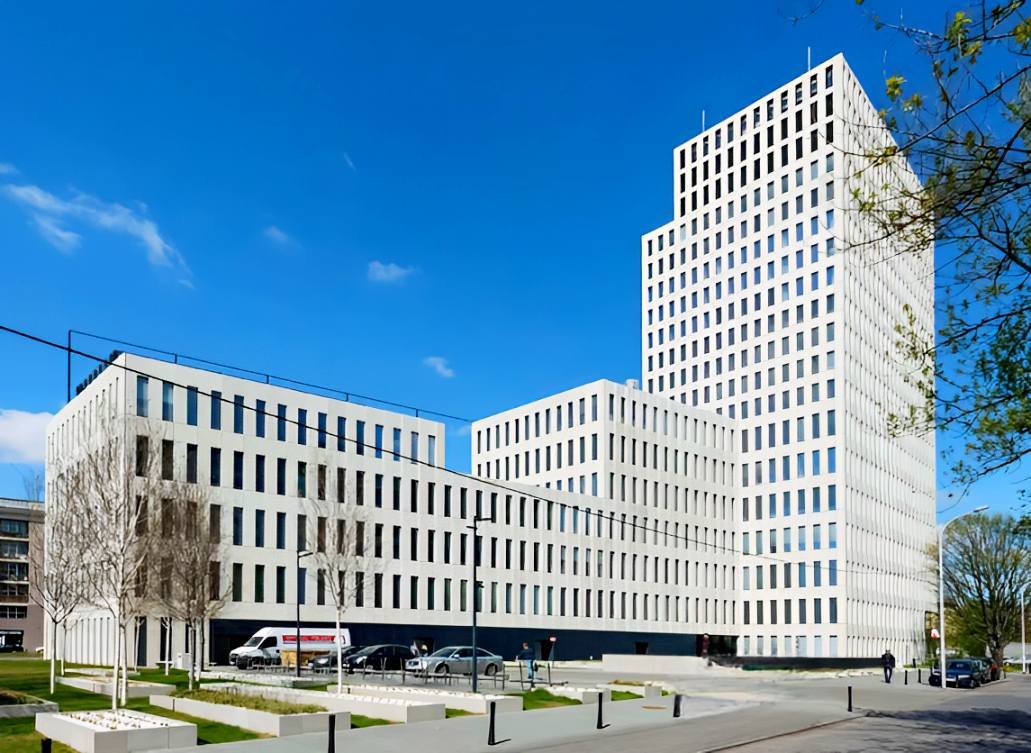
- PKBWL headquarters

Agency overview
- Formed: 2002
- Jurisdiction: Polish territory and Polish aircraft
- Employees: 15 (April 2023)
- Agency executives: Krzysztof Miłkowski, Chairman (since 2023); Patrycja Pacak, Deputy Chairman
- Parent agency: Ministry of Infrastructure and Construction
- Website: https://pkbwl.gov.pl/en/about-us/

State Commission on Aircraft Accidents Investigation (SCAAI, Polish: Państwowa Komisja Badania Wypadków Lotniczych, PKBWL) is the civil air accident investigation agency of Poland and a division of the Ministry of Infrastructure. The agency has its headquarters in Warsaw. The mission of PKBWL is to contribute to the improvement of safety in civil aviation by investigating accidents and serious incidents in order to determine their causes and propose actions to prevent similar occurrences in the future. PKBWL was established in 2002 under the Aviation Law Act and operates by a minister responsible for transport.

== Legal mandate ==
PKBWL is an aviation safety investigation authority referred to in Art. 4.1. of Regulation (EU) No 996/2010 of the European Parliament and of the Council of 20 October 2010 on the investigation and prevention of accidents and incidents. PKBWL shall conduct its investigations into accidents and incidents in civil aviation based on the provisions of:

- The Act of 3 July 2002 Aviation Law
- Regulation (EU) No 996/2010
- and shall take into account the standards and recommended practices set out in Annex 13 to the Convention on International Civil Aviation.

Pursuant to the provisions of the above-mentioned legal documents, within the scope of its activity, PKBWL is functionally independent from any authority that is responsible for safety and/or issuing regulations regarding civil aviation, as well as from any other entities whose interests or goals may pose a conflict with the tasks that were entrusted to PKBWL.

== PKBWL organization ==
The Commission consists of a Chairman, two Deputy Chairmen, the Secretary and other members who are appointed by a minister responsible for transport for a term of 4 years. To become PKBWL member a person should have an appropriate tertiary education and a documented 5-yearexperience in a relevant field.

In addition, experts with qualifications and experience necessary for the investigation into an aviation occurrence may participate in the investigations conducted by the PKBWL.

PKBWL operates through the Commission's office in Warsaw and field offices in Gliwice and Poznań.

== Accident and incident investigations ==
The Commission investigates accidents and serious incidents to civil aircraft on the territory of the Republic of Poland and in the Polish airspace, as well as aircraft registered in Poland and aircraft operated by Polish operators if it is provided for by international agreements or regulations.

Other incidents to these aircraft shall be investigated by a respective aircraft user or air navigation services provider or aerodrome operator under the supervision of the PKBWL unless the PKBWL Chairman decides the investigation to be undertaken by the PKBWL.

PKBWL investigates and supervises investigations to determine their causes and issue safety recommendations to prevent similar occurrences in the future. PKBWL investigation is separated and independent from any judicial or administrative proceedings that aim to apportion blame or liability.

== See also ==
- State Commission on Maritime Accident Investigation
- Aviation safety
