= RAF Bruggen =

Former Royal Air Force station in North Rhine-Westphalia, Germany

RAF Brüggen
- Elmpt, North Rhine-Westphalia in Germany
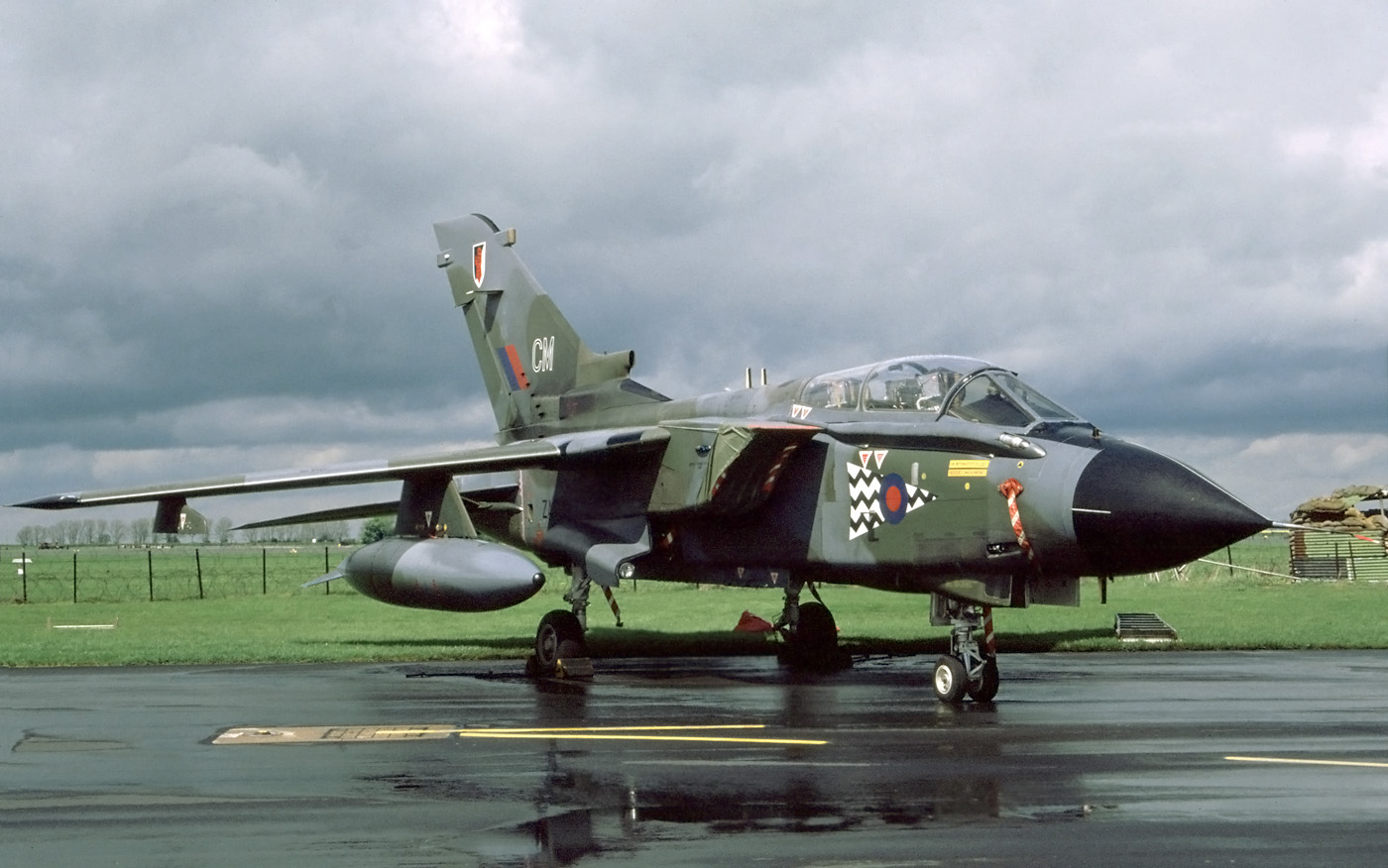
- Panavia Tornado GR1 of No. 17 squadron which was based at Brüggen.

- To Seek and Strike

Site information
- Type: Royal Air Force station
- Owner: Ministry of Defence (UK)
- Operator: Royal Air Force
- Controlled by: British Forces Germany

Location
- Shown within Germany
- Coordinates: 51°12′00″N 6°7′46″E

Site history
- Built: July 1952 – May 1953
- Built by: RAF Airfield Construction Branch
- In use: June 1953 – 28 April 2002
- Fate: Transferred to British Army to become Javelin Barracks, Elmpt Station.

Airfield information
- Identifiers: IATA: BGN, ICAO: EDUR
- Elevation: 73 metres (240 ft) AMSL
Runways
Direction	Length and surface
09/27	2,487 metres (8,159 ft) Asphalt

Royal Air Force Brüggen, more commonly known as RAF Brüggen (formerly IATA: BGN, ICAO: EDUR) in Germany was a Royal Air Force station until 15 June 2001. It was situated next to the village of Elmpt, approximately 43 kilometres (27 mi) west of Düsseldorf on the Dutch–German border. The base was named after the village of Brüggen, the nearest rail depot. Construction began in mid-1952, which involved the clearing of forest and draining of marshland. The station became active in 1953 during the rapid expansion of NATO forces in Europe. The main paint shop situated next to the main runway was responsible for the surface finishing of all aircraft, ground equipment and RAF Regiment Rapier missile systems. In 2002, it was handed over to the British Army and renamed Javelin Barracks.

== History ==
=== 317 Supply and Transport Column ===
In 1953, the 317 Supply and Transport Column arrived at RAF Brüggen from Uetersen. This followed the decision to supply all RAF stations in Germany through the port of Antwerp. In 1954 the unit was redesignated as a Mechanical Transport Squadron and was responsible for equipping and supplying all RAF stations in Germany and The Netherlands. The unit remained at Brüggen until 1963, when it was amalgamated into the No. 431 Maintenance Unit RAF which continued to operate until 1993. The demise of 317 MT Squadron marked the end of an era, as it had been on the continent shortly after D-Day under its previous title of 317 Supply & Transport Column. It had built itself an enviable reputation and following the cessation of hostilities carried out convoys to Prague, Warsaw and Moscow. In the 1950 Review of the Royal Air Force, the unit was described as the Carter Paterson of the autobahns.

Throughout its life, 317 carried out a number of humanitarian operations; the first being medical supplies to Bergen-Belsen. This was followed in 1947 by Operation Woodpecker in which timber and peat were supplied to the civilian population of northern Germany in one of the coldest winters on record. This was followed by the return of displaced persons and POWs to their home towns and cities within the British Zone. They were called upon again at the start of the Berlin Airlift (Operation Plain Fare), and lastly, in the winter of 1962/3, the Squadron took a convoy of fuel trucks to the oil refineries in Rotterdam for heating oil which was delivered to hospitals in Germany during the great freeze when the canals were inoperable.

=== 1954–1998 – strike/attack role ===
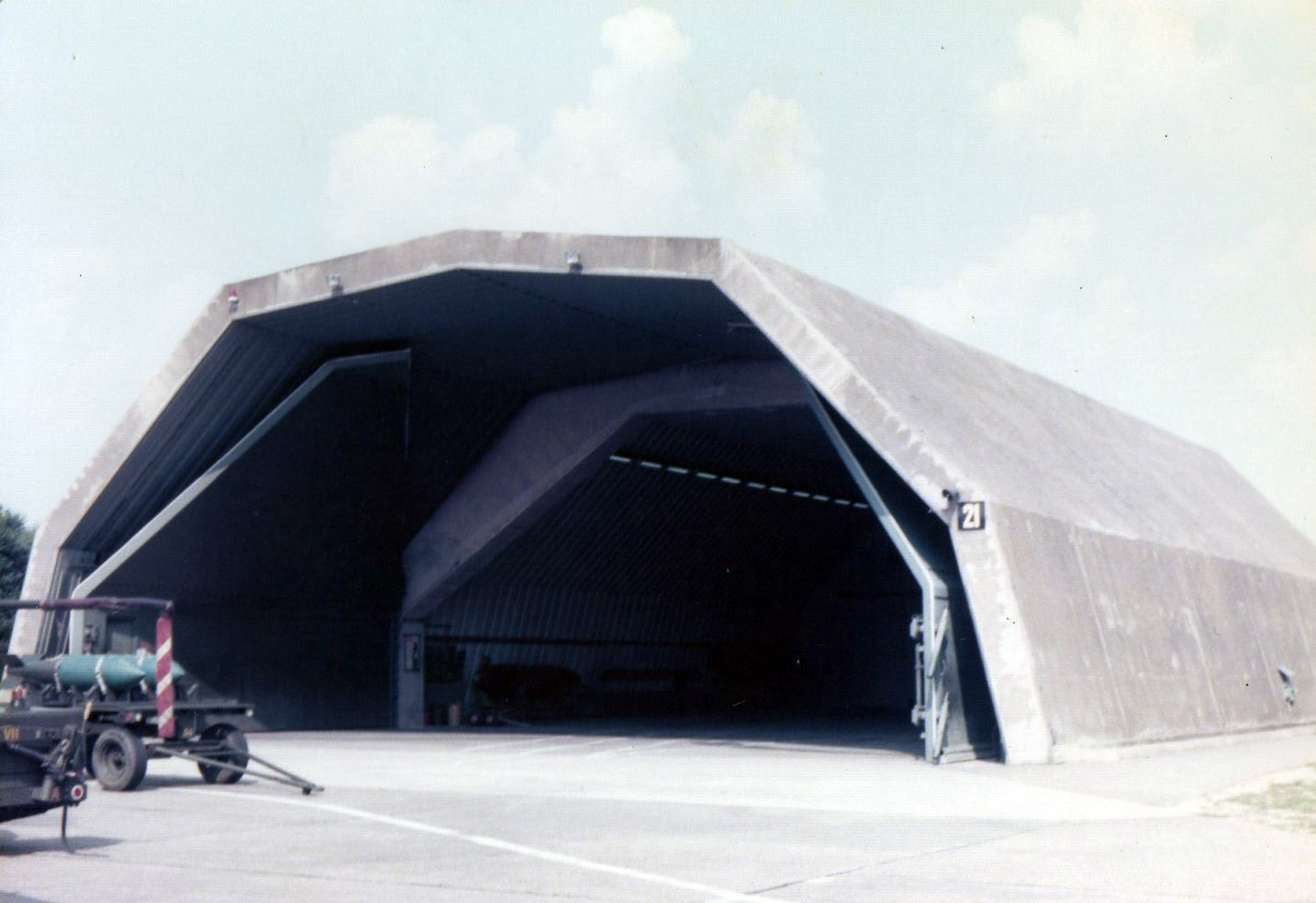
Hardened Aircraft Shelter at RAF Bruggen, 1981

From c.1954–1957 the fighter squadrons at Bruggen were 67, 71E, 112 & 130, equipped initially with Canadair Sabre F.4s, later re-equipped with the Hawker Hunter F.4s. These squadrons were either redeployed or disbanded in 1957 with the arrival of 87 Squadron, equipped with Gloster Javelin FAW.1s. The initial strike capability at RAF Brüggen was provided by the English Electric Canberra from the summer of 1957. From 1969 to 1975 the Phantom FGR.2 operated in the strike/attack role and was replaced by the SEPECAT Jaguar GR.1 from 9 April 1975. The Jaguars were replaced by the Panavia Tornado GR.1 beginning on 13 June 1984. With a total of four Tornado GR.1 squadrons at Brüggen and four more at its nearby sister airbase RAF Laarbruch, Brüggen and Laarbruch formed the largest Tornado force in NATO. Hardened Aircraft Shelters were equipped with the U.S. Weapon Storage Security System (WS3), each able to store up to 4 WE.177 tactical nuclear bombs, for delivery by Tornado aircraft.

==== 1984 – nuclear incident ====
On 4 September 2007, the British military admitted that there had been an accident with a nuclear weapon at RAF Brüggen on 2 May 1984. The nuclear weapon fell from a transport truck, as the missile wasn't securely attached to the truck. The weapon was eight times more powerful than the bomb that was dropped on Hiroshima in 1945. The casing was X-rayed after the incident, and found to have been undamaged. The six people who were responsible for the accident received a reprimand for their actions in the incident.

=== 1998–2001 – attack role ===
Following reunification of Germany, the RAF announced plans to reduce its presence in the country by half. One major part of this was the reduction of Tornado squadrons in Germany from seven to four, No.9, No.14, No.17 and No.31 squadrons. No.9, No.14 and No.31 squadrons took part in the Gulf War, and later operated from Bruggen during NATO's air operations in the Kosovo War, supported by Vickers VC10 tankers.

==== Drawdown and closure ====
The decision to remove all RAF assets from Germany was taken in 1996. As a result of the Strategic Defence Review No. 17 Squadron disbanded on 31 March 1999 and began the gradual drawdown of the base. No. 14 Sqn relocated to RAF Lossiemouth in January 2001. A formal ceremony on 15 June officially ended a continuous Royal Air Force presence in Germany since World War II and all of the remaining Tornados had left for RAF Marham by 4 September 2001.

== Brüggen squadrons ==
- No. 9 Squadron RAF from 1 October 1986 until July 2001) – operating Panavia Tornado GR.1, GR.4.
- No. 14 Squadron RAF – operating:
  - Phantom FGR.2 between 1 July 1970 and 30 November 1975
  - SEPECAT Jaguar GR.1 between 1 December 1975 and 1 November 1985
  - Panavia Tornado GR.4 from 1 November 1985
- No. 17 Squadron RAF – operating:
  - Phantom FGR.2 between 1 September 1970 and 30 January 1976
  - SEPECAT Jaguar GR.1 between 1 February 1976 and 1 March 1985
  - Panavia Tornado GR.1 from 1 March 1985–99)
- No. 20 Squadron RAF – operating SEPECAT Jaguar GR.1 between 1 March 1977 and 30 June 1984
- No. 25 Squadron RAF – operating Bristol Bloodhound missiles
- No. 31 Squadron RAF – operating:
  - Phantom FGR.2 between 20 July 1971 and 30 June 1976
  - SEPECAT Jaguar GR.1 between 30 June 1976 and 1 November 1984
  - Panavia Tornado GR.1 from November 1984
- No. 67 Squadron RAF – operating:
  - Canadair Sabre F.4s between 5 July 1955 and March 1956
  - Hawker Hunter F.4s between January 1956 and 31 May 1957
- No. 71 Squadron RAF – operating:
  - Canadair Sabre F.4s between 7 July 1955 and May 1956
  - Hawker Hunter F.4s between April 1956 and 31 May 1957
- No. 80 Squadron RAF – operating English Electric Canberra PR.7 until 30 September 1969
- No. 87 Squadron RAF – operating:
  - Gloster Javelin FAW.1 between August 1957 and January 1961
  - Gloster Javelin FAW.5 between September 1958 and October 1960
  - Gloster Javelin FAW.4 between November 1959 and January 1961
- No. 112 Squadron RAF – operating:
  - de Havilland Vampire FB.5 between July 1953 and February 1954
  - Canadair Sabre F.4s between January 1954 and April 1956
  - Hawker Hunter F.4s between April 1956 and May 1957
- No. 130 Squadron RAF – operating:
  - Canadair Sabre F.4s between August 1953 and May 1956
  - Hawker Hunter F.4s between April 1956 and May 1957
- No. 213 Squadron RAF operating English Electric Canberra B(I).6 between 22 August 1957 and 31 December 1969
- No. 37 Squadron RAF Regiment – operating BAC Rapier.
- No. 431 Maintenance Unit RAF.

▪︎ 52 Field Squadron (Construction) Royal Engineers

== Post RAF use ==
=== British Army use ===
With the Royal Air Force having no use for the site, the base was handed over to the British Army on 28 February 2002 to become Elmpt Station, Javelin Barracks. The 18-hole RAF Brüggen Golf Club became West Rhine Golf Club.

The barracks were closed in November 2015 and the site returned to German authorities.

Former British Army units

- 7th Signal Regiment
- 16th Signal Regiment
  - Support Squadron
  - 207 Signal Squadron
  - 230 Signal Squadron
  - 255 Signal Squadron
- 628 Signal Troop
- 1st Military Intelligence Battalion
  - HQ Company
  - Operations Support Company
  - 15 Military Intelligence Company
  - 16 Military Intelligence Company

=== Non-military use ===
Since December 2015 the accommodation units have been used by the German government to house refugees.

As of February 2026, the 882 hectares (2,180 acres) area is owned by the Bundesanstalt für Immobilienaufgaben (BImA). In 2020 negotiations are under way to sell it to Entwicklungsgesellschaft "Energie- und Gewerbepark Elmpt" mbH (EGE), a company founded in 2016 with the objective of converting 150 hectares (370 acres) of the area into an energy and industry park.

== See also ==
- Advanced Landing Ground
- List of aircraft of the Royal Air Force
- List of former Royal Air Force stations
- List of Royal Air Force aircraft squadrons
