= List of serving senior officers of the Royal Air Force =

This is a list of serving air officers in the Royal Air Force. It includes currently serving air chief marshals, air marshals, air vice-marshals, and air commodores.

== Air Chief Marshals ==
Name	Photo	Appointment	Branch	Honours	Date of promotion	Ref
Sir Richard John Knighton		Chief of the Defence Staff	Engineer	KCB, ADC	2 June 2023	
Sir Harvey Smyth		Chief of the Air Staff	Flying	KCB, OBE, DFC, ADC	29 August 2025	
Sir John Jackson Stringer		Deputy Supreme Allied Commander Europe	Flying	KCB, CBE	5 March 2026	

== Air Marshals ==
Name	Photo	Appointment	Branch	Honours	Date of promotion	Ref
Sean Keith Paul Reynolds		Air Officer, Northern Ireland	Royal Air Force Reserve	CB, CBE, DFC	9 May 2016	
Clare Samantha Walton		Director General, Defence Medical Services	RAF Medical Services	CB, KHP	3 July 2023	
Sir Paul Harron Lloyd		Deputy Chief of the Air Staff, Air Command; Air Member for Personnel, Air Force Board	Engineer	KBE	18 September 2023	
Allan Paul Marshall		Chief of Joint Operations	Flying	OBE	8 March 2024	
Paul Alexander Godfrey		Assistant Chief of Space Operations for Future Concepts and Partnerships, United States Space Force	Flying	CB, OBE	15 June 2024	
Alan K. Gillespie		Director-General of the Defence Safety Authority	Flying	CBE	29 November 2024	
Timothy Telfer Jones		Deputy Chief of Defence Staff, Force Development		CBE	1 September 2025	
Suraya Antonia Marshall		Deputy Commander Cyber & Specialist Operations Command	Flying	CBE	28 November 2025	
Mark Robert Flewin		Air and Space Commander	Flying	CBE	30 July 2026	

== Air Vice-Marshals ==
Name	Photo	Appointment	Branch	Honours	Date of promotion	Ref
Margaret Elaine West		Service Complaints Panel Member	Royal Air Force Reserve	CBE	1 August 2013	
Philip Thomas Giles Lester		Senior Directing Staff, Royal College of Defence Studies	RAF Regiment (VeRR Reserve)	CBE QCVS	4 May 2021	
Tamara Nancy Jennings		Deputy Commandant, Royal College of Defence Studies	RAF Legal Branch	CB, OBE	29 September 2018	
Ranald Torquil Ian Munro		to retire	transferred from British Army	CB, CBE, TD, VR, ADC, DL	23 September 2019	
Alastair Peter Thomas Smith			Flying	CB	31 August 2020	
Simon Scott Edwards		Air Secretary; Director of People, Air Command	Flying	CB	17 May 2021	
Timothy David Neal-Hopes		Commander, National Cyber Force	Engineer	CB, OBE	9 August 2021	
Philip Jeremy Robinson		Chief of Staff (Operations), Permanent Joint Headquarters	Flying	CBE, DFC**	6 December 2021	
Mark William James Chappell			Flying	CB	5 January 2021	
David Scott Arthurton		Director of Strategy and Defence Digitisation, Defence Digital	Flying	CB, OBE	13 May 2022	
Peter James Murray Squires		Director, Military Aviation Authority	Flying	OBE, ADC	1 September 2022	
Giles Leslie Legood		Chaplain-in-Chief of the Royal Air Force; Archdeacon for the Royal Air Force	Royal Air Force Chaplains Branch	MBE, KHC	5 August 2022	
Ian Jon Townsend		Assistant Chief of the Air Staff	Flying	CBE	22 May 2023	
David Cyril McLoughlin			RAF Medical Services	CBE	5 June 2023	
Jeremy John Attridge		Director, Saudi Armed Forces Project	Flying	CB, OBE	20 June 2023	
Thomas James Patrick Burke		Vice Director United States European Command	Flying		25 August 2023	
Shaun Harris		Director of Typhoon Exports	Engineer	CBE	27 September 2023	
Jason Lee Appleton			Flying		29 February 2024	
James Anthony Beck		Director of Capability and Programmes, Air Command		OBE	2 April 2024	
Thomas Ashbridge		Director of Operations, Defence Digital			19 July 2024	
Richard Hill		Service Complaints Panel Member	Royal Auxiliary Air Force	CBE	25 July 2024	
Mark Phelps		Director of Legal Services, Air Command	Legal Services	OBE	27 September 2024	
Mark K. Ridgway		Director of Defence Futures, Strategic Command			28 October 2024	
Adrian Stewart Burns		Assistant Chief of the Defence Staff (People Capability)	Personnel	CBE	25 November 2024	
Simon Robert Strasdin		Air Officer Commanding, No. 1 Group		CBE	27 November 2024	
Mark Hunt		Deputy Director-General, Defence Safety Authority; Director (Technical), Military Aviation Authority	Engineer	OBE	19 December 2024	
Paul Michael Rose		Director Support and Chief Engineer		MBE	21 March 2025	
Mark George Jackson		Assistant Chief of the Defence Staff (Military Strategy)		OBE	28 March 2025	
Ola A. Fashade		Director Strategy and Military Digitalisation Defence Digital			30 May 2025	
Martin Christopher Lowe		Director Air Fixed Wing, Defence Equipment and Support			5 September 2025	
Stephen Paul Kilvington		Air Officer Commanding, No. 11 Group		CBE	28 September 2025	
Andrew Timothy Martin		Director Integrated Air and Missile Defence Directorate	Flying	CBE	27 October 2025	
Ian James Sharrocks		Air Officer Commanding, No. 22 Group		CBE	12 November 2025	
Christopher Anthony Mullen		UK Defence Attaché to the USA; Head of the British Defence Staff, United States			16 January 2026	
Angela Marjorie Baker		Director Joint Support, National Armaments Directorate			13 February 2026	
Lee Turner		Commander, Joint Aviation Command			23 March 2026	
Anthony John Lyle		Air Officer Commanding, No. 2 Group		ADC	March 2026	
Mark John Farrell		Director of Ukrainian Capabilities, Ministry of Defence			April 2026	
Darren Richard Ellison		Director Defence Healthcare, Defence Medical Services	Medical		5 May 2026	
Martin G. Brockie		Assistant Commander, Cyber & Specialist Operations Command			13 May 2026	
Adam M. Bone		Director Intelligence, Surveillance and Reconnaissance Group			22 May 2026	
James William Stephen Thompson		Commander, United Kingdom Space Command		CBE	1 June 2026	
Richard James Yates		Director Group Operations, National Armaments Directorate, Ministry of Defence		MBE	31 July 2026	
Christopher J. Layden		Director Operations and Warfare, Cyber and Specialist Operations Command			12 October 2026	

=== Acting ===
Name	Photo	Appointment	Branch	Honours	Date of promotion	Ref
Christopher D. Snaith		Head of Design and Build, Strategic Command		OBE	15 February 2021	

== Air Commodores ==
Name	Photo	Appointment	Branch	Honours	Date of promotion	Ref
Paul Nolan Oborn		Service Complaints Panel Member	Royal Air Force Reserve		1 July 2007	
C. M. Smith		Service Complaints Panel Member			2 September 2013	
Nigel Timothy Bradshaw		Deputy Defence Services Secretary; Head of Ceremonial Events, Honours, and Recognition, Ministry of Defence		CBE	13 April 2015	
John Philip Wariner			Royal Air Force Reserve		1 April 2016	
Adam Mark Sansom		Air Officer, Northern England	Engineer		24 June 2016	
Simon Andrew Harper		Air Officer, Southeast England	Administrative	OBE	26 September 2016	
Dominic A. Stamp			Flying	CBE	3 July 2017	
Mark S. Sexton			Provost		June 2018	
Michael R. Wilson		Head of Cyber Governance and Risk Compliance, Ministry of Defence	Engineer		30 November 2018	
Patrick Keiran O'Donnell			Personnel	CBE	8 January 2019	
Robert A. Woods		Air Officer, Wales	Engineer	OBE ADC	26 April 2019	
Hugh F. Smith		Head of Doctrine (Air, Space and Cyber), Development, Concepts and Doctrine Centre	Flying		24 July 2020	
Mark J. Northover		Air Officer Scotland	Engineer	MBE, ADC	17 July 2020	
Jason N. Young		Head Tactical Systems	Engineer		16 September 2020	
Andrew David Huggett		Deputy Air Secretary			5 October 2020	
Richard Fogden		Director, RAF Sport		CBE	1 December 2020	
Luke J. Houghton		Assistant Chief of Staff (Health), Air Command; Head, Royal Air Force Medical Services	Medical		26 April 2021	
Mike James Blackburn					5 May 2021	
Joanne L. Lincoln				MBE	15 July 2021	
James Philip Brayshaw		Head of Future Workforce Planning, Ministry of Defence	Administrative		1 October 2021	
Andrew Dickens				OBE	1 November 2021	
Elizabeth Mary Purcell		Director of Development, Joint Support and Enabling Command			20 November 2021	
Gavin Paul Hellard		Deputy Commandant General, Royal Auxiliary Air Force		CBE	13 December 2021	
Mark E. Puzey					6 June 2022	
Nicholas Charles Joseph Brittain		People Workforce Planning and Performance Head		OBE	29 July 2022	
Nikki S. Thomas				OBE	13 September 2022	
Mark W. Smith		Principal Staff Officer to the Chief of the Defence Staff		OBE	4 November 2022	
Simon D. Joy		Head of Regulation and Certification, Military Aviation Authority		OBE	15 November 2022	
Andrew Gilbert		Head of Combat Air, Defence Equipment and Support			15 December 2022	
Simon E. Young		Head of Air Systems Equipment and Training, Defence Equipment & Support			3 January 2023	
Howard Edwards					30 January 2023	
Nicholas J. Stringer		Deputy Director of Plans and Portfolio Management, Ministry of Defence			17 February 2023	
Emily Jane Flynn		Head of Strategic Engagement, Air Command		CBE	31 March 2023	
Georgia A. Williams		Head of Defence Support Capability, Strategic Command			2 May 2023	
Matthew James Stowers		UK Defence Attaché to Oman		OBE	28 May 2023	
Nicholas A. Tucker-Lowe		Head Collaborative Combat Aircraft and StormFighter Senior Responsible Owner		DSO	10 July 2023	
Gareth J. Bryant		Head of Helicopters 3, Defence Equipment and Support		OBE	21 July 2023	
Alun G. Roberts		Head Capability Air Mobility and Enablers			31 July 2023	
Daniel James		Higher Command and Staff Course Director		CBE	14 August 2023	
Steven A. Berry		Commandant, Air and Space Warfare Centre		MBE	21 August 2023	
David James Peter Crook		Head of Strategic Workforce Planning and Recruiting, Air Command		OBE	13 October 2023	
Peter M. Saul		Head of Command and Control, Targeting, Navigation and Communications, Defence Equipment and Support		OBE	27 October 2023	
Craig Stephen Watson		Director Support Major Programmes (from March 2027)			30 October 2023	
Andrew David Turk		Deputy Commander, NATO Airborne Early Warning and Control Force Command; Chief of Staff, NATO Airborne Early Warning and Control Force Command		DFC	1 November 2023	
Darren Jay Whiteley		Deputy Commander, United Kingdom Space Command			22 November 2023	
Patrick James Shea-Simonds		Assistant Chief of Staff (Strategy), Air Command		OBE	30 November 2023	
Philip James Wadlow					15 December 2023	
Paul David Yates		Deputy Director of Infrastructure, Ministry of Defence			1 February 2024	
Nicholas James Paton		Head of Combat Aviation Programmes, Army Command		DFC	23 February 2024	
Martin Leonard Cunningham		Deputy Commander and Chief of Staff Headquarters British Forces Cyprus			26 February 2024	
Leah Griffin		Head People Services, Royal Air Force			4 March 2024	
Sally Elizabeth Courtnadge		Head of Russia and Eurasia Centre, Defence Intelligence			19 April 2024	
Michael Henton Graham Carver		Deputy Director of Strategy, Policy, and Plans (Allied Integration), United States Southern Command			26 April 2024	
Christopher William Todd		Assistant Chief of Staff (People and Families Support), Air Command			30 April 2024	
David John Rowland		Head, Defence AI Centre			8 May 2024	
Nicholas Michael Worrall		Air Mobility Force Commander		CBE	24 May 2024	
Mark David Lorriman-Hughes		Commandant, Royal Air Force College Cranwell		OBE, ADC	4 June 2024	
Mark Edward Biggadike		Regional Air Officer Southwest	Royal Air Force Reserve	MBE	17 June 2024	
Robin Anthony Caine		Director of Flying Training, No. 22 Group		MBE	4 July 2024	
Nicholas James Alexander Huntley		Head of Support Futures and Operational Energy, Air Command			22 July 2024	
David J. Wilkinson		Deputy Director of Strategy, Engagement, and Force Development, Air Command	Royal Air Force Police		15 August 2024	
Beverley Jane Gleave		Service Complaints Panel Member			16 August 2024	
Victoria Caroline McPhaden		Head of Armed Forces Remuneration, Ministry of Defence		CBE	29 August 2024	
Claire Hazel O′Grady				CBE, ADC	30 August 2024	
D. Allen Lewis		Commandant Air Cadets	Engineer		2 September 2024	
Niall Richard Griffiths		Deputy Air Officer Commanding, No. 22 Group; Assistant Chief of Staff (Training), Air Command			4 October 2024	
Kevin Jonathan Sanders		Deputy Director of Legal Services, Air Command			15 October 2024	
Jonathan H. Fortune		Head Future Combat Air System, Air Command; Chief Digital and Information Officer, Air Command			1 November 2024	
Edward Ashley Cripps		Chief of Staff, Standing Joint Force Headquarters	Regiment		8 November 2024	
Mark David Quick		Head of Programmes, Saudi Arabian Armed Forces Project			14 November 2024	
Stephen Robert Willsher		Assistant Chief of Staff (Operations), Defence Digital			18 November 2024	
Roger Grenville Elliott		Commander, Combat Air Force			25 November 2024	
Paul Tavus Hamilton		Commandant General, Royal Air Force Regiment		MBE	13 January 2025	
S. E. Blackwell		Commander, Air Bases		OBE	17 January 2025	
M. J. Clulo		Head of Support Chain Service, Defence Equipment and Support			3 March 2025	
D. G. McGurk		Deputy Director Operations, No. 11 Group			4 April 2025	
Andrew Brian Read			Royal Air Force Reserve		19 May 2025	
W. D. Cooper		Head Military Strategic Effects and Deputy Director National Security			3 June 2025	
M. C. Butterworth		Assistant Chief of Staff Capability Delivey Intelligence, Surveillance and Reconnaissance, Headquarters Air Command		OBE	9 June 2025	
W. J. H. Andrew		Assistant Chief of Staff J1/J4, Permanent Joint Headquarters			2 July 2025	
Mark Thomas Manwaring		Head, Capability Safety Group, Army Command	Royal Air Force Reserve		8 July 2025	
P. M. Morley		Deputy Director Royal Air Force Digital and Chief Information Security Officer			18 July 2025	
R. E. Mawdsley		Assistant Chief of Staff Career Management		OBE	22 August 2025	
S. J. Cloke		Chief of staff, Air			5 September 2025	
E. K. Gilbertson		Programme Director, Future Combat Air Systems			5 September 2025	
G. J. Burdett		Head Operating Assurance Group		OBE	12 September 2025	
F. A. Wigglesworth		Assistant Chief of Staff Operations and Joint Force Air Component Commander, Headquarters Air Command			1 October 2025	
S. D. M. Fortune		Head Air to Air Missiles, Strategic Programmes, National Armament Director Group			10 October 2025	
Sonja Margaret Phythian			Royal Air Force Reserve	OBE	27 October 2025	
Julian Anthony Paul Ladd			Royal Air Force Reserve	TD, VR	27 October 2025	
M. D. Hoare		Head Air Capability Delivery Combat Air			21 November 2025	
G. T. Taylor		Head People Strategy			28 November 2025	
K. E. Rutland		Commander Joint Hospital Group			1 December 2025	
S. J. Chappell		Corporate Services Director, Chief of Staff Defence Housing Service			1 December 2025	
P. J. B. Marr		Assistant Chief of Staff Plans, No. 11 Group			5 December 2025	
Peter Nigel Cracroft		UK Defence Attaché to Ukraine; Head of the British Defence Staff, Eastern Europe	Flying	CBE		
Jonathan Blythe Crawford			Royal Auxiliary Air Force	CBE	16 December 2025	
P. Reid		Assistant Chief of Staff (Infrastructure), Air Command			6 February 2026	
P. J. R. Warmerdam		Defence Attaché, Canberra			13 February 2026	
E. L. Redman		Commandant Head Defence Medical Academy			16 March 2026	
P. O′Grady		Deputy Director International Combat Air Relationships			5 May 2026	
E. A. O′Sullivan		Head of Strategy and Plans			12 May 2026	
K. E. Ferris		ISTAR Force Commander		OBE	8 June 2026	
J. R. Butcher		Head of Military Strategy, Rest of the World		OBE	30 June 2026	
P. M. Jennings		Head Capability C4ISR, Cyber and Specialist Operations Command			10 July 2026	
J. T. S. Parker		Head of Capability Planning			13 July 2026	
J. G. Brock		Assistant Chief of Staff (J9), Allied Joint Force Command Brunssum			20 July 2026	
E. T. Hutchison		Defence Attaché, Canada			6 August 2026	
T. Walker		Deputy Air Officer Commanding No. 2 Group RAF			6 August 2026	
A. Chisholm		Air and Space Attacé, United States		OBE	11 September 2026	
R. L. Dixon		Assistant Chief of Staff (J2), Permanent Joint Headquarters		OBE	11 September 2026	
R. A. Hart		Technical Authority National Armaments Director Group			16 September 2026	
C. G. W. Gibb		Air Support Head Engineering and Logistics			21 September 2026	
G. E. Read		Deputy Director Intelligence/Assistant Chief of Staff A2			5 October 2026	
J. J. Hanson		Assistant Chief of Staff (Capability Delivery, C2IAMD), Air Command		OBE	November 2026	

=== Acting ===
Name	Photo	Appointment	Branch	Honours	Date of promotion	Ref

== See also ==
- List of serving senior officers of the Royal Navy
- List of serving senior officers of the Royal Marines
- List of serving senior officers of the British Army
