= List of serving senior officers of the Royal Navy =

This is a list of serving senior officers of the Royal Navy. It includes currently serving admirals, vice-admirals, rear-admirals, and commodores.

General Sir Gwyn Jenkins, KCB, OBE, ADC, Royal Marines, was appointed the First Sea Lord and Chief of the Naval Staff as of 15 May 2025.

== Vice-Admirals ==
Name	Photo	Appointment	Former branch	Honours	Date of promotion	Ref
Sir Christopher Gardner (Reserves)		Chief Executive Officer, Submarine Delivery Agency	Logistics	KBE	9 April 2019	
Paul Marshall (Reserves)			Engineering	CB, CBE	21 April 2023	
Sir Andrew Jeffery Kyte		Chief of Defence Logistics and Support	Logistics	KBE, CB	18 September 2023	
Edward Ahlgren		Senior Advisor for Middle Eastern Affairs	Warfare (Submarines)	OBE	1 May 2024	
Simon Asquith		Chief of Staff, Allied Command Transformation	Warfare (Submarines)	CB, OBE	8 July 2024	
James Morley		Deputy Commander, Joint Force Command Norfolk	Warfare	CB	14 October 2024	
Steve Moorhouse		Fleet Commander	Warfare/Fleet Air Arm	CBE	5 September 2025	
Paul S. Beattie		Second Sea Lord and Deputy Chief of the Naval Staff	Warfare	CBE	30 September 2025	
Robert Pedre		Commander, Allied Maritime Command	Warfare	CB	January 2026	

== Rear-Admirals ==
Name	Photo	Appointment	Former branch	Honours	Date of promotion	Ref
Richard A. Murrison			Logistics		11 July 2021	
Paul Christopher Carroll		Director of Innovation and Future Capability, Defence Equipment and Support	Engineering	OBE	2 August 2021	
Judith Helen Terry		Director of Integration Homeland Defence	Logistics		12 January 2022	
Steven Dainton		Senior Directing Staff, Royal College of Defence Studies	Warfare	CBE	18 July 2022	
Anthony Kingsmill Rimington		Director of Force Generation, Navy Command; Rear Admiral Fleet Air Arm	Warfare/Fleet Air Arm		1 November 2022	
Robert Alexander Lauchlan		Chief Strategic Systems Executive, Ministry of Defence	Engineering (Submarines)	CB	8 March 2023	
Angus Nigel Patrick Essenhigh		National Hydrographer, United Kingdom Hydrographic Office	Warfare	OBE	27 June 2023	
Steven J. McCarthy		Director, UK/Norway Maritime Capability Partnership Office; Chief Naval Engineer Officer	Engineering	CB	12 October 2023	
Paul A. Murphy		Director of Defence Support Major Programmes, Ministry of Defence; Chief Naval Logistics Officer	Logistics		23 October 2023	
Craig Wood		Deputy Commander, Naval Striking and Support Forces NATO	Warfare	CBE	9 April 2024	
Andrew B. Perks		Director Submarines, Navy Command; Rear Admiral Submarines	Engineering (Submarines)	MBE	22 April 2024	
Paul A. Stroude		Director of Capability, Cyber & Specialist Operations Command	Warfare		10 June 2024	
Fiona R. Shepherd		Assistant Chief of the Defence Staff (Support Operations)	Logistics	MBE	1 October 2024	
Richard A. Harris		Director Develop; Controller of the Navy	Engineering		23 June 2025	
Philip Gordon Game			Engineering	CBE	August 2025	
Mark Edgar John Anderson		Commander United Kingdom Strike Force	Warfare	CBE	9 September 2025	
Andrew Donald Rose		Naval Secretary and Director of People and Training	Warfare/Fleet Air Arm	OBE	6 January 2026	
Matthew P. Stratton		Director Navy Acquisition	Engineering		2 February 2026	
Rachel M. Singleton		Director of Navy Digital	Engineering	MBE	3 March 2026	
Anthony S. Williams		Head of Capability, UK Space Command	Warfare		15 June 2026	
Marcus E. Rose			Engineering		24 August 2026	

=== Surgeon Rear-Admiral ===
Name	Photo	Appointment	Former branch	Honours	Date of promotion	Ref
Fleur T. Marshall		Retired	Medical		21 March 2023	

== Commodores ==
Name	Photo	Appointment	Former branch	Honours	Date of promotion	Ref
Martin E. Quinn		Head of Reserve Forces 2030, Ministry of Defence	Royal Naval Reserve		19 April 2016	
Simon P. Huntington		retiring	Warfare	OBE	20 February 2017	
Thomas J. Guy		Commander, British Forces Gibraltar	Warfare		1 July 2018	
Stephen David Roberts		Deputy Director of Ship Acquisition, Navy Command	Engineering	CBE	20 March 2019	
Christopher D. Goodsell		Deputy Director of Submarines, Navy Command	Warfare		23 March 2020	
Jonathan D. Lett		Deputy Director of Policy, United States Indo-Pacific Command	Warfare		16 November 2020	
Sharon Louise Malkin		Commander, His Majesty's Naval Base Clyde	Engineering	CBE, ADC	2 June 2021	
Martyn R. Boyes			Engineering		28 June 2021	
Timothy Cooper Green		Commander Regional Forces; Naval Regional Commander London and Eastern England	Warfare	CBE, ADC	31 March 2022	
Andrew G. Lamb			Warfare	OBE	25 Jul 2022	
Robert E. Curry		Director, Deterrence and Defence of the European/Atlantic Area Implementation Group			July 2022	
Richard A. New		Deputy Chief Naval Logistics Officer	Logistics		2 October 2022	
Donald J. Mackinnon		Deputy Commander, Combined Joint Operations from the Sea Center of Excellence	Warfare	OBE	31 October 2022	
Richard J. Whalley		Deputy Director of Exports and Sales, Ministry of Defence	Royal Naval Reserve		January 2023	
Stephen J. Bolton		Deputy Director of Aviation Programmes and Futures, Navy Command	Warfare		6 February 2023	
Toby S. Jefferson		Deputy Director of Infrastructure, Navy Command	Engineering		6 February 2023	
Andrew J. E. Ashfield Smith		Head of Communications Strategy, Ministry of Defence	Warfare		20 April 2023	
James Blackmore			Warfare		23 May 2023	
Jason F. Strutt		Deputy Chief Digital and Information Officer, Navy Command	Engineering		12 June 2023	
Andrew R. Ingham		Commander Fleet Operational Standards and Training	Warfare		4 July 2023	
Andrew G. James		Deputy Director of Submarine Capability, Defence Nuclear Organisation	Engineering		4 July 2023	
Stephen Andrew Large		Head of Naval Ship Support, Defence Equipment and Support	Engineering	OBE	10 July 2023	
Joanna L. Adey			Engineering		25 July 2023	
David M. Filtness			Warfare	CBE	14 August 2023	
Paul Carter		Deputy Director of AUKUS, Defence Nuclear Organisation	Engineering		4 September 2023	
Matthew M. Solly		Deputy Commandant, Defence Academy of the United Kingdom	Engineering		9 October 2023	
Steven Jose		Head of UK Military Flying Training Systems, Defence Equipment and Support	Engineering		30 October 2023	
John M. Punch			Warfare	OBE	11 December 2023	
Suzi Nielson		Commander Maritime Reserves	Logistics	OBE	2 January 2024	
Johanna Deakin			Engineering	OBE	16 January 2024	
Andrew R. Robinson		Head of Customer Service Team, Defence Infrastructure Organisation	Warfare		14 April 2024	
Karen M. M. Rees		Director of Defence Support Chains Operations and Movements, Ministry of Defence	Logistics		22 April 2024	
Marcus J. C. Hember		Deputy Director of Maritime Capability and Force Development, Navy Command	Warfare		13 May 2024	
Alan D. Tracey		Head of Defence Maritime Regulator, Defence Safety Authority	Engineering		20 May 2024	
Tobias G. Waite		Commodore Naval Staff; Deputy Director of Policy and Engagement, Navy Command	Warfare		28 May 2024	
Michael L. Wood		Deputy Director of Shipbuilding, Navy Command	Warfare	MBE	24 June 2024	
Richard J. Purdy		Deputy Director of People Change, Navy Command	Engineering		24 June 2024	
Conor M. O′Neill		Head of Finance Military Capability Strategy, Ministry of Defence	Warfare		29 July 2024	
Marcel M.G. Rosenberg		Commander, His Majesty's Naval Base Portsmouth	Engineering	ADC	9 September 2024	
Jonathan A. Carrigan		Deputy Director, National Shipbuilding Office	Logistics		9 September 2024	
Christopher Edmund Maurice Saunders		UK Defence Attaché to India	Warfare	MBE	23 September 2024	
Benjamin W. Aldous					3 January 2025	
Katherine L.M. Armstrong			Warfare		6 January 2025	
Ian D. Feasey		Deputy Director of Ships, Navy Command; Commodore Surface Flotilla	Warfare		30 January 2025	
Sarah Ellen Oakley		Deputy Director of Strategy, Military Strategic Headquarters	Warfare		24 February 2025	
Jonathan E. Gregory		Deputy Director, AUKUS Pillar I	Engineering		25 March 2025	
Andrew M. J. Ainsley		Deputy Commander United Kingdom Strike Force	Warfare		1 May 2025	
Matthew J. Flegg		Chief of Staff, Navy Command HQ	Engineering		2 June 2025	
Manson J. Carnie		UK Naval Attaché to the USA	Warfare		23 June 2025	
Caroline P. Dix		Head of Lethality, Defence Equipment and Support	Engineering	MBE	26 June 2025	
Daniel D. H. Simmonds		Deputy Commander Maritime Operations	Warfare	OBE	30 June 2025	
Stuart J. Richardson		Director, Dreadnought Supply and Support Team, Submarine Delivery Agency	Engineering		1 July 2025	
Neil B. Mathieson			Engineering		1 July 2025	
Richard P. H. Hutchings		UK National Military Representative, Supreme Headquarters Allied Powers Europe	Warfare		21 July 2025	
Nicholas M. Sargent		Head of Helicopters 1, Defence Equipment and Support	Engineering		21 July 2025	
Christopher Ling		Head of Defence Case Management System, Ministry of Defence	Engineering		11 August 2025	
Stephanie R. Pearmain		Head of Diversity and Inclusion, Ministry of Defence	Engineering	OBE	11 August 2025	
Gary J. Carpenter			Engineering		1 September 2025	
Iain S. Tough			Engineering		1 September 2025	
Alistair C. Moody		Director of Nuclear Propulsion, Submarine Delivery Agency	Engineering		12 December 2025	
Daniel H. Thomas		Deputy Commander Combined Maritime Forces and UK Maritime Component Commander	Warfare		3 January 2026	
Matthew R. Ryder			Engineering		5 January 2026	
Glyn Owen		Deputy Director Culture, Navy Command	Warfare	OBE	19 January 2026	
Roma J. Roe		Commander, His Majesty's Naval Base Devonport	Engineering		26 January 2026	
Richard P. Hewitt			Warfare	OBE	24 February 2026	
Matthew I. Rees			Logistics		23 March 2026	
Shaun P. Riordan			Engineering		30 March 2026	
David Andrew Joyce		Deputy Director of People Strategy, Navy Command	Royal Naval Reserve			
Timothy J. Davey		Commander British Forces Gibraltar	Warfare		4 May 2026	
Stuart G. Irwin			Warfare		25 May 2026	
Jeremy H. D. Ussher		Deputy Director of Individual Training, Navy Command; Commandant, Training Management Group	Engineering		15 June 2026	
Christopher D. Cochrane			Engineering		15 June 2026	
Giles R. Palin			Warfare		18 June 2026	
Grant A. Weedon			Engineering		22 June 2026	
Stephen R. Anderson			Warfare		10 August 2026	
John Gordon			Engineering		21 September 2026	

=== Acting ===
Name	Photo	Appointment	Former branch	Honours	Date of promotion	Ref
Steven David Banfield		Co-Chair, Maritime Capability Development Coalition for Ukraine	Warfare			
Benjamin S. Haskins		Commander Submarine Flotilla; Commodore Submarine Service	Warfare	CBE		
Tristram Andrew Harry Kirkwood		Naval Regional Commander Wales and Western England	Warfare	OBE, ADC		
Thomas Knowles		Naval Regional Commander Northern England	Royal Naval Reserve	VR, ADC		
Justin Robert Ernest Saward		Navy Safety Director	Engineering			

=== Surgeon Commodores and Commodore QARNNS ===
Name	Photo	Appointment	Former branch	Honours	Date of promotion	Ref
Stuart W. S. Millar		Responsible Officer, Doctors, Army Command	Medical		31 July 2017	
Alison J. Hofman		Head of the Royal Navy Medical Service; Medical Director General (Naval)	QARNNS		28 May 2020	
Elizabeth Crowson		Commander Defence Primary Healthcare	Medical		22 August 2022	
Andrew M. Nelstrop		Head of the Royal Navy Medical Service (desig)	Medical		1 September 2023	
Jason E. Smith		Medical Director to the Surgeon General; Head of Research and Clinical Innovation, Defence Medical Services	Medical	CBE, KHP	18 March 2024	

=== Royal Fleet Auxiliary ===
Name	Photo	Appointment	Former branch	Honours	Date of promotion	Ref
Sam Shattock		Deputy Director, Royal Navy Afloat Support; Commodore Royal Fleet Auxiliary	Royal Fleet Auxiliary			

== See also ==
- List of serving senior officers of the Royal Marines
- List of serving senior officers of the British Army
- List of serving senior officers of the Royal Air Force
- List of Royal Navy admirals (1707–current)
- List of Royal Navy vice admirals
- List of Royal Navy rear admirals
