= List of serving senior officers of the British Army =

This is a list of serving senior officers of the British Army. It includes currently serving generals, lieutenant generals, major generals, and brigadiers.

== Generals ==
Name	Photo	Appointment	Former regiment/corps	Honours	Date of promotion	Ref
Dame Sharon Patricia Moffat Nesmith		Vice Chief of the Defence Staff	Royal Signals	DCB	10 June 2024	
Sir Charles Roland Vincent Walker		Chief of the General Staff	Grenadier Guards; Special Air Service	KCB, DSO	15 June 2024	
Nicholas Charles Laybourne Perry		Commander Joint Force Command Norfolk	Royal Hussars	DSO, MBE	25 September 2026	

== Lieutenant generals ==
Name	Photo	Appointment	Former regiment/corps	Honours	Date of promotion	Ref
Sir Charles Seymour Collins		Deputy Chief of the Defence Staff (Military Strategy and Operations)	Royal Green Jackets; The Rifles	KBE, DSO	4 September 2023	
Sir Simon Peter Hamilton		Deputy Chief of the General Staff	Royal Electrical and Mechanical Engineers	KBE	8 December 2023	
Michael Richard Elviss		Commander, Allied Rapid Reaction Corps; Master Gunner, St James's Park	Royal Artillery	CB, MBE, QCVS (x2)	March 2024	
Jeremy Matthew James Bennett		Deputy Commander, Allied Land Command	Royal Artillery	CB, CBE	18 October 2024	
John Robert Mead		Deputy Commander, Allied Joint Force Command Brunssum	Royal Artillery	CB, OBE	6 December 2024	
Anna-Lee Reilly		Director General of Core Delivery, Defence Equipment and Support	Royal Electrical and Mechanical Engineers	CB	18 August 2025	
Paul Raymond Griffiths		Commander, Standing Joint Command	Royal Signals	CB	1 September 2025	
Eldon Nicholas Somerville Millar		UK National Military Representative to NATO; UK National Military Representative to the EU	Royal Engineers	CVO, MBE	12 January 2026	
Zachary Raymond Stenning		Commander Land Forces	Green Howards; Yorkshire Regiment	CB, OBE	30 March 2026	
Matthew Howard Jones		Chief of Defence Intelligence	Intelligence Corps	OBE	29 June 2026	
Thomas Julian Bateman		Commander Multinational Force Ukraine	Royal Scots Dragoon Guards; Royal Dragoon Guards	CBE	July 2026	
Philip David Prosser		Chief of Defence Logistics and Support	Royal Electrical and Mechanical Engineers	CBE	6 November 2026	

== Major generals ==
Name	Photo	Appointment	Former regiment/corps	Honours	Date of promotion	Ref
Gerald Mark Strickland		Senior British Loan Services Officer to Oman	6th Queen Elizabeth's Own Gurkha Rifles; Royal Gurkha Rifles	CB, DSO, MBE	6 May 2019	
Sir James Maurice Hannan Bowder			Grenadier Guards	KCVO, OBE	19 July 2019	
Christopher Brendan Kevin Barry			Royal Anglian Regiment; Royal Welsh; Special Air Service	CBE	10 December 2021	
Thomas Howard Bewick		Commander, British Forces Cyprus	The Light Infantry; The Rifles	OBE	5 May 2022	
Marc Anthony John McHardy Overton		Assistant Chief of the Defence Staff (Reserves and Cadets)	Princess of Wales’s Royal Regiment; London Regiment	CB, TD, VR	15 June 2022	
Jonathan Swift		Assistant Chief of the General Staff	Royal Regiment of Fusiliers	OBE	6 July 2022	
Mark Pullan			Royal Artillery	CBE	12 September 2022	
Julian N.E. Buczacki			Royal Lancers	CBE	2 December 2022	
Benjamin James Cattermole		Commander, Joint Inter-Agency Task Force Lazurite	Royal Scots Dragoon Guards	CBE	5 May 2023	
Andrew J. W. Sturrock		Director of Strategy and Plans, Defence Infrastructure Organisation	Royal Engineers		3 July 2023	
Dominic Stead James Biddick		Deputy Commander, NATO Rapid Deployable Corps – Italy	Royal Anglian Regiment	MBE MC	28 July 2023	
Daniel Reeve		Assistant Chief of Defence Staff (Operations and Commitments)	Educational and Training Services Branch; The Rifles	MC	31 July 2023	
Oliver J. Kingsbury		Commander, Land Warfare Centre; Director of Land Warfare, Army Command	Parachute Regiment	OBE	2 August 2023	
James Matthew Senior		Commander, Army Cadet Force	Light Dragoons	CBE	21 August 2023	
Samuel Leslie Humphris		Director of Personnel, Army Command	Duke of Wellington's Regiment; Yorkshire Regiment	CB, MBE	11 September 2023	
The Lord Lancaster of Kimbolton		Director of Reserves, Army Command	Royal Engineers	TD, VR, PC	3 October 2023	
Robin Ronald Edward Lindsay			Black Watch; Royal Regiment of Scotland	CBE	13 October 2023	
Ian Alexander J. Turner		Assistant Chief of the Defence Staff (Capability and Force Design)	Irish Guards	DSO	23 October 2023	
Charles A. Hewitt			Royal Artillery		4 December 2023	
Richard A. Allen		Director of Army Legal Services	Army Legal Services		1 January 2024	
Mark R. Purves		Director of Information, Army Command; Chief Information Officer, Army Command	Royal Signals		1 March 2024	
Jonathan Edward Alexander Chestnutt		Deputy Chief of Staff, Field Army	Royal Logistic Corps	CBE	22 April 2024	
John L. Clark		Allied Joint Force Command Naples	Royal Engineers	CBE	24 July 2024	
Lisa C. Keetley		Assistant Chief of Defence Staff (People Capability); Defence Services Secretary	Royal Electrical and Mechanical Engineers		2 September 2024	
Nicholas David Guise Cowley		Commandant of the Royal Military Academy Sandhurst; General Officer Commanding, Army Individual Training Command; Director of Army Leadership	The Queen's Royal Hussars	OBE	18 October 2024	
John Richards Kendall		Deputy Commander Field Army	Royal Signals	VR, DL	19 November 2024	
James Chenevix Coote		Senior British Military Advisor to United States Central Command	Royal Engineers; Princess of Wales's Royal Regiment	DSO, OBE	31 January 2025	
Joseph Edward Fossey		Director of Recruiting, Army Command	Royal Engineers	OBE	28 February 2025	
Andrew D. Cox		Deputy Commanding General (Support), III (US) Armored Corps	Staffordshire Regiment; Mercian Regiment	MBE	4 April 2025	
Robert Sholto James Hedderwick		General Officer Commanding, 1st (United Kingdom) Division	Black Watch; Royal Regiment of Scotland		1 August 2025	
Philip A. Carter		Surgeon-General of the United Kingdom Armed Forces	Royal Army Medical Corps		4 August 2025	
Charles Edward Digby Grist		Deputy Commanding General (Manoeuvre), V (US) Corps	Royal Gloucestershire, Berkshire and Wiltshire Regiment; The Rifles	OBE	15 August 2025	
Matthew Timothy Cansdale		Director of Futures, Army Command	Parachute Regiment	CBE	15 September 2025	
Alexander James Smith		Director of Basing and Infrastructure, Army Command	Royal Signals	CBE	25 September 2025	
Christopher King		Director of Programmes, Army Command	Royal Electrical and Mechanical Engineers	CBE	3 October 2025	
Anthony Peter Finn		Director of Medical Personnel and Training, Defence Medical Services	Royal Army Medical Corps		17 November 2025	
Carl William Boswell		Chief of Staff, Field Army	Devonshire and Dorset Regiment; The Rifles	CBE, QCVS	17 November 2025	
Neil Darren Grant		Chief of Staff, Allied Rapid Reaction Corps	Worcestershire and Sherwood Foresters Regiment; Mercian Regiment	DSO, MC	21 November 2025	
Oliver Charles Christopher Brown			Royal Anglian Regiment	CBE		
Peter J. Rowell		Commandant, Defence Academy of the United Kingdom	Royal Engineers			
Philip A. J. McNee			Royal Army Medical Corps			
Marcus J. Mudd		Deputy Chief of Staff (Plans), Headquarters Joint Force Command Naples	Queen’s Royal Lancers; Royal Lancers	CBE, DSO	16 January 2026	
Owen George Bunkle		Director Support Army Command Headquarters	Royal Logistic Corps		26 January 2026	
Tobias Lambert		Senior Military Advisor and Operations Director International Collaboration and Exports	Royal Electrical and Mechanical Engineers	OBE	31 April 2026	
Justin George Edward Stenhouse		General Officer Commanding, Regional Command	1st The Queen's Dragoon Guards	CBE, DSO	13 July 2026	
Rupert Spark Evetts		Chief of Staff, Land Forces	Blues and Royals	OBE	31 July 2026	
Henry Lister Searby		General Officer Commanding, 3rd (United Kingdom) Division	Queen′s Royal Lancers	OBE	3 September 2026	
David Thomas Pack		Vice Director United States European Command	Royal Gurkha Rifles	OBE	15 September 2026	
Michael John Fayers		Commander Defence Cyber and Electro Magnetic Force	Royal Signals		14 September 2026	
Nicholas Thomas		Military Secretary and General Officer, Scotland	1st The Queen's Dragoon Guards	CBE	19 October 2026	
Mark Simon Peter Berry		General Officer Commanding, London District; Major-General commanding the Household Division	Life Guards		3 November 2026	

=== Acting ===
Name	Photo	Appointment	Former regiment/corps	Honours	Date of promotion	Ref
Elizabeth Jane Faithfull-Davies		Director of Land Equipment, Defence Equipment and Support	Royal Electrical and Mechanical Engineers	CB, CBE	March 2024	

=== Chaplain-Generals ===
Name	Photo	Appointment	Former regiment/corps	Honours	Date of promotion	Ref
Michael D. Parker		Chaplain-General to His Majesty's Land Forces	Royal Army Chaplains' Department		8 May 2022	

== Brigadiers ==
Name	Photo	Appointment	Former regiment or corps	Honours	Date of promotion	Ref
Stephen William Rayson		Deputy Commander, Standing Joint Command	Royal Corps of Transport; Royal Logistic Corps	QVRM, TD, VR	23 August 2019	
Raymond Griffiths Hughes		Deputy Commander, Army Recruiting	Duke of Lancaster's Regiment	QVRM TD	9 May 2020	
Nigel J. Best			17th/21st Lancers; Queen’s Royal Lancers; Royal Lancers	OBE	30 June 2020	
Alison L. Curnow			Royal Logistic Corps		30 June 2020	
Christopher D. Davies		Head of International Communications and Engagement, Army Command	Princess of Wales's Royal Regiment	OBE	30 June 2020	
Keith J. Eble		Head Legal Advisory, Army Command	Army Legal Services		31 December 2020	
Philip J. Bassingham-Searle			Green Howards; Yorkshire Regiment		30 June 2021	
Richard Stewart Charles Bell			Royal Irish Regiment	CBE	30 June 2021	
Matthew J. Birch		Head of C4ISTAR, Army Command	Royal Artillery		30 June 2021	
Lucinda Caryl Westerman		Deputy UK National Military Representative to the EU	Royal Signals	CBE	30 June 2021	
Duncan Robertson Wilson			Royal Army Medical Corps	QHP	30 June 2021	
Jon P. Cresswell			Royal Artillery		31 December 2021	
Julian Guy Hill		Director, Saudi Arabian National Guard Communications Project	Royal Signals	OBE	31 December 2021	
Shay Joseph James Marks		Commander, British Military Mission to Kuwait	Intelligence Corps	CBE	31 December 2021	
Edward Dixon Sandry			Parachute Regiment	OBE	31 December 2021	
James W. Taylor		Head of Personnel Policy, Army Command	Royal Regiment of Fusiliers	MBE	31 December 2021	
Mark C. P. Wilson			Royal Green Jackets; The Rifles	MBE	31 December 2021	
Matthew Joseph Petersen		Head, Army Staff Forum	Parachute Regiment; Royal Welsh Regiment; Royal Welsh	VR	1 March 2022	
Gillian Heather Wilkinson		Deputy Military Secretary (Reserves)	Army Reserve; Royal Logistic Corps	QVRM	28 April 2022	
Adam Fraser-Hitchen		Deputy Commander (Reserves), 3rd (United Kingdom) Division	Royal Electrical and Mechanical Engineers	ADC, DL, VR	2 May 2022	
Bibek Banerjee		Head, Royal Army Medical Service (Reserves)	Army Reserve	QVRM	27 June 2022	
Guy Justin Boxall		Assistant Chief of Staff (Infrastructure), Cyber & Specialist Operations Command	Royal Engineers	MBE	30 June 2022	
Neil James Mark Budd			Royal Artillery	OBE	30 June 2022	
Guy Baron Foden		Assistant Chief of Staff (Operations), Permanent Joint Headquarters	Royal Anglian Regiment		30 June 2022	
Andrew Michael Gilks		Head of CBRN Capability, Cyber & Specialist Operations Command	Army Air Corps	MBE	30 June 2022	
Andrew D. Griffiths		Commander, Armed Forces Recruiting	Staff and Personnel Support Branch	OBE	30 June 2022	
Craig Ian Hanson		Commander, 101st Operational Sustainment Brigade	Royal Logistic Corps	CBE	30 June 2022	
Richard Paul Hart		Head of Global Campaigns, Russia, and Wider Europe, Ministry of Defence	Royal Artillery		30 June 2022	
Matthew Richard Wilkinson		Assistant Chief of Staff (Equipment), Field Army	Royal Engineers	MBE	30 June 2022	
James Owen McCay Lyttle			Royal Irish Regiment; Army Reserve	MBE, TD, VR	4 July 2022	
Christopher John Ledsham			Army Reserve	TD	17 October 2022	
Mark Jeffrie Comer		Deputy Assistant Director of Logistics and Resources, International Military Staff	Royal Logistics Corps	CBE	31 December 2022	
Andrew Stuart Garner		Commandant, The Soldier Academy	Yorkshire Regiment	CBE	31 December 2022	
Denis James		Commander, British Military Mission to Saudi Arabian National Guard	Life Guards		31 December 2022	
Jaish Kanaresh Mahan		Deputy Commander (Reserves), 1st (United Kingdom) Division	Royal Army Medical Corps		5 June 2023	
Robert Nicholas Alston		Chief of Joint Fires and Influence, Allied Rapid Reaction Corps	Royal Regiment of Artillery	MBE	30 June 2023	
Simon John Carvel		Senior Liaison Officer to the Chairman of the Joint Chiefs of Staff	Royal Engineers		30 June 2023	
Philip de Rouffignac		Senior Responsible Officer, Renovator Project	Royal Army Medical Corps	MStJ	30 June 2023	
Leigh James Drummond			Royal Regiment of Scotland	MBE	30 June 2023	
Daniel Bruce Duff		Chief of Joint Force Operations, Permanent Joint Headquarters	1st The Queen's Dragoon Guards		30 June 2023	
Paul M. Hayhurst		UK Defence Attaché to Pakistan	Army Air Corps		30 June 2023	
Jeremy Lamb		Head of Military Euro-Atlantic Security, Ministry of Defence	Royal Regiment of Fusiliers	MC	30 June 2023	
Michael John Morton			Royal Signals		30 June 2023	
Sarah Louise Pringle-Smith		Provost Marshal; Commander, 1st Military Police Brigade; Chief of Military Police, Allied Rapid Reaction Corps; Inspector of Service Custody Premises	Adjutant General′s Corps		30 June 2023	
Jeremy Andrew Rostron			Parachute Regiment		30 June 2023	
Robert James Singleton		Commander, Combat Manoeuvre Centre	Duke of Lancaster's Regiment		30 June 2023	
Simon Geoffrey Smith			Royal Electrical and Mechanical Engineers	MBE	30 June 2023	
Caroline J. Woodbridge-Lewin		Commandant, Defence College of Technical Training	Royal Signals	MBE	30 June 2023	
John Marcus Hugh Woolmer			Intelligence Corps		30 June 2023	
Timothy Peter Jenkins		Deputy Director of Reserves, Army Command	Princess of Wales's Royal Regiment	OBE, TD, VR	7 August 2023	
Peter Beaumont		Director of Operations, Army Recruiting	Royal Artillery		31 December 2023	
Jody Philip Davies		Commander, 51st Infantry Brigade and Headquarters Scotland	Royal Corps of Transport; Royal Gurkha Rifles	MBE	31 December 2023	
Jamie Christopher Murray			Royal Gurkha Rifles		31 December 2023	
Peter Thomas Quaite		Head of Infrastructure Plans, Army Command	Royal Engineers	CBE	31 December 2023	
Graeme Crichton Wearmouth			Royal Scots; Royal Regiment of Scotland	OBE	31 December 2023	
Nicholas Marshall Wight-Boycott		Commander, Royal Military Academy Sandhurst	Royal Scots; Royal Regiment of Scotland	OBE	31 December 2023	
Benjamin Mark Wilde		UK Defence Attaché to Saudi Arabia	Cheshire Regiment; Mercian Regiment	MBE	31 December 2023	
Patrick William Benjamin Wright		Head of Armed Forces and Veterans Services, Defence Business Services	Adjutant General′s Corps	CBE	31 December 2023	
Nicholas James Sutherland			Royal Anglian Regiment; East of England Regiment	VR	1 February 2024	
Jason Ainley		Chief Engineer, Allied Rapid Reaction Corps; Chief of Civil-Military Interaction, Allied Rapid Reaction Corps; Colonel Commandant, Royal Corps of Army Music	Royal Engineers	OBE	30 June 2024	
Peter William Stanhope Baines		Commander, Army Special Operations Brigade	Royal Green Jackets; The Rifles	OBE	30 June 2024	
Matthew Richard Baker		Head of Integration and Training, Integrated Warfare Centre	Educational and Training Services Branch; Royal Gloucestershire, Berkshire and Wiltshire Regiment; The Rifles	OBE	30 June 2024	
Joanna Leigh Bowen		Head of Operational Law, Army Command	Army Legal Services		30 June 2024	
Oliver John Hamlyn Bryant		UK Defence Attaché to Kenya	Worcestershire and Sherwood Foresters Regiment; Mercian Regiment		30 June 2024	
Edward Gilbert Robin Cartwright		Commander, 16 Air Assault Brigade	Parachute Regiment	OBE	30 June 2024	
Duncan Campbell Close		Deputy Commanding General, 1st (French) Armored Division	Black Watch; Royal Regiment of Scotland		30 June 2024	
Samuel George Cooke		Head of Equipment Plans, Defence Equipment and Support	Royal Logistics Corps		30 June 2024	
Christopher Lionel Coton		Head of Concepts and Joint Force Development, Defence Futures	Royal Artillery		30 June 2024	
Nicholas George English		Commander, 1st Aviation Brigade Combat Team	Army Air Corps	MBE	30 June 2024	
Adam Nicholas Baron Foden			Queen's Royal Lancers; Royal Lancers	DSO MBE	30 June 2024	
Andrew James Charles Geary		Chief of Staff, Regional Command	Army Air Corps	OBE	30 June 2024	
Christopher Gent		Deputy Chief of Staff (Transformation and Integration), Allied Land Command	Royal Artillery		30 June 2024	
David Charles Glendenning		Commander, 3rd Deep Reconnaissance Strike Brigade	Royal Artillery		30 June 2024	
Richard George Hallett		Commander, Standing Joint Force Logistics Component	Royal Logistic Corps	OBE	30 June 2024	
Gavin Paul Hatcher		Head of Overseas and Training, Defence Infrastructure Organisation	Royal Engineers	OBE	30 June 2024	
Matthew Gordon Timothy Lewis		Commander, 11th Brigade	Royal Regiment of Wales; Royal Welsh	OBE	30 June 2024	
Paul Gordon Loader		Head of Deployed and Interoperability Services, Cyber and Electromagnetic Command	Royal Electrical and Mechanical Engineers		30 June 2024	
Gary Andrew McDade		Deputy Commander (Cadets), Regional Command	Royal Gloucestershire, Berkshire and Wiltshire Regiment; The Rifles		30 June 2024	
Elizabeth Anne Mortimore		Head of Information Services, Army Command	Royal Signals		30 June 2024	
Christopher Palmer		Head of Reserves, Ministry of Defence	Light Dragoons	OBE	30 June 2024	
Simon Andrew Ridgway		Commander, Collective Training Group	Royal Tank Regiment	OBE	30 June 2024	
Andrew Ridland		Deputy Commanding General (Maneuver), 1st (US) Armored Division	Royal Green Jackets; The Rifles		30 June 2024	
Nicholas Serle		Head of Military Capability Delivery, Army Command	King's Own Royal Border Regiment; Duke of Lancaster′s Regiment		30 June 2024	
Kieran Andrew Sheldon		Head of Programmes, Army Command	Royal Artillery		30 June 2024	
Andrew Derrick Watson		Commander, 7th Light Mechanised Brigade	King's Own Scottish Borderers; Royal Regiment of Scotland	OBE	30 June 2024	
James David Webster		Commandant, Royal School of Military Engineering	Royal Engineers		30 June 2024	
Thammy Evans		Head of Personnel (Reserves), Army Command	Army Reserve; Intelligence Corps	QVRM, VR	22 July 2024	
Lisa V. Brooks		Commander, 19th Brigade	Army Reserve; The Light Infatry, Royal Artillery	VR, ADC	1 August 2024	
Darin Gray		Head of Strategy (Reserves), Army Command	Royal Engineers		19 August 2024	
Richard Neil Byfield		Chief Digital and Data Officer, Army Command; Principal AI Officer, Army Command	Royal Signals	MBE	31 December 2024	
Dominic Crispin Dudley Coombes			Royal Scots Dragoon Guards		31 December 2024	
Nigel Offley Crewe-Read		Vice Chief of Staff, Allied Rapid Reaction Corps	Royal Regiment of Wales; Royal Welsh	OBE	31 December 2024	
Melissa Grace Emmett		Head, Army Personnel Services Group	Intelligence Corps	MBE	31 December 2024	
Thomas Anthony Harper		UK Defence Attaché to Nigeria	The Light Infantry; The Rifles	MBE	31 December 2024	
Andrew James Rogers		Deputy Chief of Staff (Support), Rapid Reaction Corps – France	Royal Electrical and Mechanical Engineers		31 December 2024	
Timothy John Symonds		Head of Efficiency, Army Command; Head of Climate Change and Sustainability, Army Command	Royal Logistics Corps	OBE	31 December 2024	
Alexander Graham Johnson		Head of Strategy and Plans, Defence Medical Services	Royal Army Medical Corps	OStJ	13 January 2025	
Graham Norman Cox			Royal Gloucestershire, Berkshire and Wiltshire Regiment; The Rifles	QVRM, VR	3 March 2025	
Timothy John Allison		Head of Land Common Services, Defence Equipment and Support	Royal Electrical and Mechnical Engineers		30 June 2025	
Piers Lyndon Ashfield		Commander, 38th (Irish) Brigade	Grenadier Guards	DSO, MBE	30 June 2025	
Richard David Hadley Ball		Deputy Commander, Joint Aviation Command; Chief of Staff, Joint Aviation Command	Army Air Corps	OBE	30 June 2025	
David William Nicholas Bevan		UK Military Attaché to the USA	Welsh Guards	MVO	30 June 2025	
Joseph William Brown		Commander, 104th Theatre Sustainment Brigade	Royal Logistics Corps		30 June 2025	
Elizabeth Ann Byfield		Head of Recruitment and Retention, Ministry of Defence	Royal Signals		30 June 2025	
Sam Edward Armel Cates		Deputy Commander, London District	The Rifles		30 June 2025	
Mark Tyrtoff Davis		Commander, 160th (Welsh) Brigade	Royal Regiment of Wales; Royal Welsh; Mercian Regiment	CBE	30 June 2025	
Oliver Philip Butler Dobson		Commander, 4th Light Brigade	Royal Regiment of Scotland	MBE	30 June 2025	
Paul Mark Dupuy		Deputy UK National Military Representative to NATO; Chief of Staff, UK National Military Delegation to NATO	Royal Artillery	MBE	30 June 2025	
Assia Leila Green		Head of Defence Operational Capability, Military Strategic Headquarters	Royal Logistics Corps		30 June 2025	
H. Geoffrey Hargreaves		Commander, Joint Task Force Orbital	Parachute Regiment		30 June 2025	
Richard Charles Harmer		Commander, British Forces South Atlantic Islands	Royal Artillery		30 June 2025	
Samuel David Hughes		Head, Army Personnel Centre	Royal Engineers		30 June 2025	
Brian Kenneth Jeffery		Commander, 1st Signal Brigade; Chief of Communications, Allied Rapid Reaction Corps	Royal Signals		30 June 2025	
Henry Simon Llewelyn-Usher		Deputy Commanding General (Interoperability), 82nd (US) Airborne Division	Welsh Guards		30 June 2025	
Owain David Luke		Commander, 12th Armoured Brigade	Royal Welsh	MBE	30 June 2025	
Giles Harry Malec		Head, Army Safety Group	Royal Artillery		30 June 2025	
James Dominic Hugh Porter		Army Inspector			30 June 2025	
Harvey John Scott		Head of Information Technology, Defence Digital		MBE	30 June 2025	
William John Strickland		Deputy Coordinator, Office of Security Coordination for Israel and the Palestinian Authority	Queen's Royal Hussars	OBE	30 June 2025	
Jamie Douglas Stuart		Commander, 8th Engineer Brigade	Royal Engineers		30 June 2025	
Jonathan Christopher West		Assistant Chief of Staff (Logistics), Field Army	Royal Logistic Corps		30 June 2025	
Huw William Islwyn Thomas		Head of Healthcare, Army Command	Royal Army Medical Corps			
Paul Jason Blakesley		British Liaison Officer to United States Army Europe and Africa	King's Own Royal Border Regiment; Duke of Lancaster's Regiment	MBE		
James Edwin Ashworth			The Yorkshire Regiment	OBE	31 December 2025	
Jamie Stuart Balfour			Royal Corps of Signals		31 December 2025	
Michael John Canham			Corps of Royal Engineers	MBE	31 December 2025	
William Hywel Lewis Davies			The Queen′s Dragoon Guards	MBE	31 December 2025	
Nicholas Paul Mackenzie			The Duke of Lancaster′s Regiment		31 December 2025	
Duncan James Mann			Parachute Regiment		31 December 2025	
Oliver James Fenton Nurton			Light Dragoons		31 December 2025	
Daniel Caradoc Blackmore			Intelligence Corps	OBE	30 June 2026	
Shaun William Mark Chandler			Royal Gurkha Rifles		30 June 2026	
Sarah Louise Clifford			Royal Corps of Signals		30 June 2026	
Timothy James Jonathan Draper			Royal Regiment of Scotland	OBE	30 June 2026	
David Robertson Duncan			Intelligence Corps	OBE	30 June 2026	
Darren John Fisher			Royal Logistic Corps	MBE	30 June 2026	
Cristopher Fogarty			Royal Corps of Signals	MBE	30 June 2026	
Mark Robert Genko			Royal Logistic Corps		30 June 2026	
James Andrew Hadfield			The Rifles	OBE	30 June 2026	
Andrew John Howarth			Corps of Royal Electrical and Mechanical Engineers	MBE	30 June 2026	
Grant Jamie Kerr			Corps of Royal Engineers		30 June 2026	
James Douglas Louther Leask			Scots Guards	MBE	30 June 2026	
Hugo Timothy Lloyd			Queen′s Dragoon Guards		30 June 2026	
James Fraser Stuart McLeman			Royal Scots Dragoon Guards		30 June 2026	
Andrew Mitchell			Army Air Corps		30 June 2026	
Phillip Charles Moxey		Assistant Chief of Staff (Operations), Field Army	Royal Anglian Regiment	MBE	30 June 2026	
Richard David Newland			Corps of Royal Electrical and Mechanical Engineers	OBE	30 June 2026	
Matthew Charles Ambrose Palmer			Yorkshire Regiment		30 June 2026	
Karen Peek			Royal Regiment of Artillery	MBE	30 June 2026	
James Ewart Richard Rhodes			Royal Logistic Corps		30 June 2026	
Andrew Stewart Richardson			Royal Logistic Corps		30 June 2026	
Graham John Sefton			Royal Regiment of Scotland	CBE	30 June 2026	
Matthew Anthony Taylor			Parachute Regiment		30 June 2026	
Angus Myles Arthur Tilney			King′s Royal Hussars	MC	30 June 2026	
Andrew Patrick Todd			Royal Gurkha Rifles	MBE	30 June 2026	
Christopher James Wild			Royal Regiment of Artillery		30 June 2026	
Martin Alexander French			Scots Guards		30 June 2026	
Edward David Lionel Maskell-Pedersen			Royal Corps of Signals		30 June 2026	
Hannah Jane Stoy			Royal Corps of Signals		30 June 2026	
Timothy John Cooper			Royal Corps of Signals		30 June 2026	
Jeremy Richard Dodd			Yorkshire Regiment		3 August 2026	
Hon. Charles Leander Broughton			Army Reserve (late Grenadier Guards)	MBE	5 October 2026	

=== Acting ===
Name	Photo	Appointment	Former regiment or corps	Honours	Date of promotion	Ref

=== Deputy Chaplain-Generals ===
Name	Photo	Appointment	Former regiment or corps	Honours	Date of promotion	Ref
David John Barrett		Deputy Chaplain-General	Royal Army Chaplains' Department			

== See also ==
- List of serving senior officers of the Royal Navy
- List of serving senior officers of the Royal Marines
- List of serving senior officers of the Royal Air Force
