= Judge-advocate =

Judicial officer in armed forces for military justice

Judge-advocates are military lawyers serving in different capacities in the military justice systems of different jurisdictions.

== Australia ==
The Australian Army Legal Corps (AALC) consists of Regular and Reserve commissioned officers that provide specific legal advice to commanders and general legal advice to all ranks. They must be admitted to practice as Australian Legal Practitioners.

== Canada ==
The Office of the Judge Advocate General for the Canadian Forces provides legal advice to commanders at bases and wings, provides lawyers who defend accused persons at courts martial, teaches courses to other CF members or advises a commanding officer in an operational theatre to uphold the ethical and legal principles established by both the Canadian Forces and the Government of Canada. The current JAG of the Canadian Forces is Rear-Admiral G. Bernatchez.

== Denmark ==
The Military Prosecution Service or Judge Advocate General's Corps (Danish: Forsvarets Auditørkorps, short FAUK) is a Danish independent military prosecutor and the legal branch of the Danish military. It is a Level.I command and is under the Ministry of Defence. The Judge Advocate General (Danish: Generalauditør) heads the Defence Judge Advocate Corps. It is located at Kastellet in Copenhagen.

== United Kingdom ==
The judges who preside over all hearings of the Service courts are known while they are sitting as judge advocates. In the same way as other judges, they are appointed by the Lord Chancellor following a process conducted by the Judicial Appointments Commission (JAC) or, in the case of the Judge Advocate General, appointed by the King. They are always legally qualified civilians solicitors, barristers, or advocates – of at least seven years' standing. A High Court Judge may also sit as a judge advocate if requested to do so by the Judge Advocate General in a particularly serious case. Members of the Army Legal Services Branch or the RAF Legal Branch are not called judge-advocates.

== United States ==
The Judge Advocate General's Corps, also known as JAG or JAG Corps, is the military justice branch or specialty of the U.S. Air Force, Army, Coast Guard, Navy and Marines.

== See also ==
- Judge Advocate General
- Military justice
