= Michael Simmons (RAF officer) =

Sir Michael Simmons
- Born: 8 May 1937 (age 89)
- Military career
- Allegiance: United Kingdom
- Branch: Royal Air Force
- Service years: 1958–92
- Rank: Air Marshal
- Commands: No. 1 Group; RAF Cottesmore; No. 15 Squadron
- Awards: Knight Commander of the Order of the Bath; Air Force Cross

Air Marshal Sir Michael George Simmons, KCB, AFC (born 8 May 1937) is a former Royal Air Force officer who became Assistant Chief of the Air Staff.

== Flying career ==
Educated at Shrewsbury School, Simmons was commissioned into the Royal Air Force in 1958. He became Officer Commanding No. 15 Squadron in 1973, Station Commander at RAF Cottesmore in 1980 and Senior Air Staff Officer at Headquarters RAF Strike Command in 1980. He went on to be Air Officer Commanding No. 1 Group in 1985, Assistant Chief of the Air Staff in 1987 and Deputy Controller Aircraft in 1989 before retiring in 1992.

He is President of the Tring Branch of the Royal British Legion.

== Family ==
In 1964 he married Jean Aliwell; they have two daughters.

Military offices
| Preceded by Henton Carver | Air Officer Commanding No. 1 Group; 1984–1987 | Succeeded by John Thomson |
| Preceded by Anthony Skingsley | Assistant Chief of the Air Staff; 1987–1989 | Succeeded by John Thomson |
