= Lindsay Irvine =

Lindsay Irvine CB FRAeS
- Military career
- Allegiance: United Kingdom
- Branch: Royal Air Force
- Service years: 1986 to 2017
- Rank: Air Vice-Marshal
- Service number: 5206026U
- Commands: RAF Legal Branch
- Awards: Companion of the Order of the Bath (2014)

Air Vice-Marshal Lindsay John Irvine, CB, FRAeS is a British barrister and former senior Royal Air Force officer. He was Director of Legal Services (RAF) and the head of the RAF Legal Branch from April 2009 to April 2017.

== Early life ==
Irvine attended Robert Gordon's College Aberdeen from 1971 to 1977. He studied Classics at University College, University of Oxford. He graduated in 1981 with a Bachelor of Arts (BA) degree, which was later promoted to a Master of Arts (MA (Oxon)) degree. He subsequently studied law at City University London and was called to the bar, thereby becoming a qualified barrister.

== Military career ==
Having completed officer training at RAF College Cranwell, Irvine was commissioned into the Legal Branch, Royal Air Force, on 3 February 1986 as a flight lieutenant. On 21 July 1988, he transferred from a short service commission to a permanent commission. He was promoted to squadron leader on 5 November 1989, and to wing commander on 5 November 1995. As part of the half yearly promotions, he was promoted to group captain on 1 January 2000, and to air commodore on 1 January 2003.

On 9 April 2009, he was promoted to air vice-marshal and appointed Director of Legal Services (RAF), head of the RAF Legal Branch. He attained a light aircraft flying qualification in 1988 and maintained flying currency throughout his military career. Whilst attending the Royal College of Defence Studies in 2006, he was awarded a Master of Arts (MA) with Distinction in International Politics from King's College London. He was awarded an honorary Doctor of Laws from City, University of London in February 2017.

== Controversy ==
Air Vice Marshal Irvine was the subject of criticism for his legal advice provided to the Board of Inquiry in the Mull of Kintyre Chinook helicopter crash in 1994 (see Mull of Kintyre Review page 52 paragraph 4.4.11 - https://web.archive.org/web/20110725050734/http://www.mullofkintyrereview.org.uk/sites/default/files/Mull%20of%20Kintyre%20Review%20Report.pdf).

"In our view the legal advice afforded to Air Chief Marshal Day was unclear and inaccurate insofar as it failed to recognise the objective nature of the test, placed no restriction on the power of the higher authority to make a finding different from that made by the Board, and introduced reference to RAF policy. The reference to policy can be interpreted as an assertion that the standard of proof meant what the RAF wanted it to mean. That is manifestly incorrect and in conflict with the intention of paragraph 9. The consequence is that Air Chief Marshal Day and Air Chief Marshal Wratten misdirected themselves in relation to the standard of proof."

== Honours and decorations ==
In the 2014 New Year Honours, Irvine was appointed Companion of the Order of the Bath (CB).

Military offices
| Preceded by Richard Anthony Charles | Director of Legal Services (RAF); 2009 to 2017 | Succeeded by Alison Mardell |
