= Ian Gale =

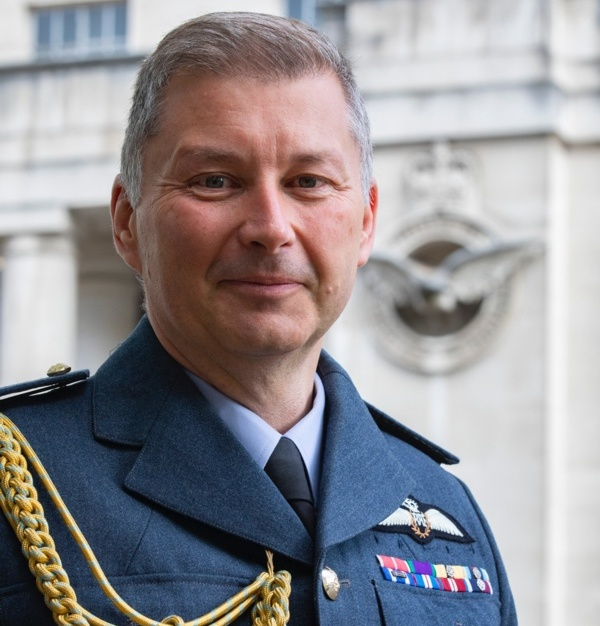
- Education: King's College London; Open University
- Military career
- Allegiance: United Kingdom
- Branch: Royal Air Force
- Service years: 1989–2024
- Rank: Air Marshal
- Nickname: Windy
- Service number: 8304212Q
- Commands: RAF Lossiemouth (2011–13); No. 31 Squadron (2008–10)
- Conflicts: Iraq War; War in Afghanistan; Operation Ellamy
- Awards: Companion of the Order of the Bath; Member of the Order of the British Empire

Ian David Gale CB MBE is a retired officer in the Royal Air Force, serving as Director-General of Joint Force Development, Strategic Command from 2021 to 2024.

== Early life and education ==
Gale was educated at Sir Thomas Picton School, a comprehensive school in Haverfordwest, Pembrokeshire, Wales. He joined the Royal Air Force (RAF) after finishing school. He studied for a Master of Arts degree in defence studies and international relations at King's College London, graduating in 2006. He studied for a Master of Business Administration with the Open University, graduating in 2012.

== RAF career ==
Gale joined the RAF in 1989. After attending the Royal Air Force College Cranwell, he was commissioned as an acting pilot officer on 26 September 1989. He served as a fast jet pilot and weapons instructor from 1989 to 2005 and, in the 2004 Queen's Birthday Honours, was appointed a Member of the Order of the British Empire.

Gale became officer commanding No. 31 Squadron in 2008, and station commander at RAF Lossiemouth in 2011. After operational service as Deputy Air Component Commander for Operation Ellamy, he became Assistant Chief of Staff for command, control, intelligence, surveillance and reconnaissance programmes in 2015.

In April 2019, Gale was promoted to air vice-marshal and appointed Assistant Chief of the Air Staff. In April 2021, he was promoted to air marshal and appointed Director-General of Joint Force Development, Strategic Command. He retired from the Air Force on 24 April 2024. Gale was appointed Companion of the Order of the Bath (CB) in the 2024 New Year Honours.

Military offices
Preceded by Andy Hine	Station Commander RAF Lossiemouth; 2011–2013	Succeeded by Mark Chappell
Preceded by Gerry Mayhew	Assistant Chief of the Air Staff; 2019–2021	Succeeded by Simon Edwards
Preceded by Edward Stringer	Director-General of Joint Force Development, Strategic Command; 2021–2024	Succeeded by TBA
