= Alison Mardell =

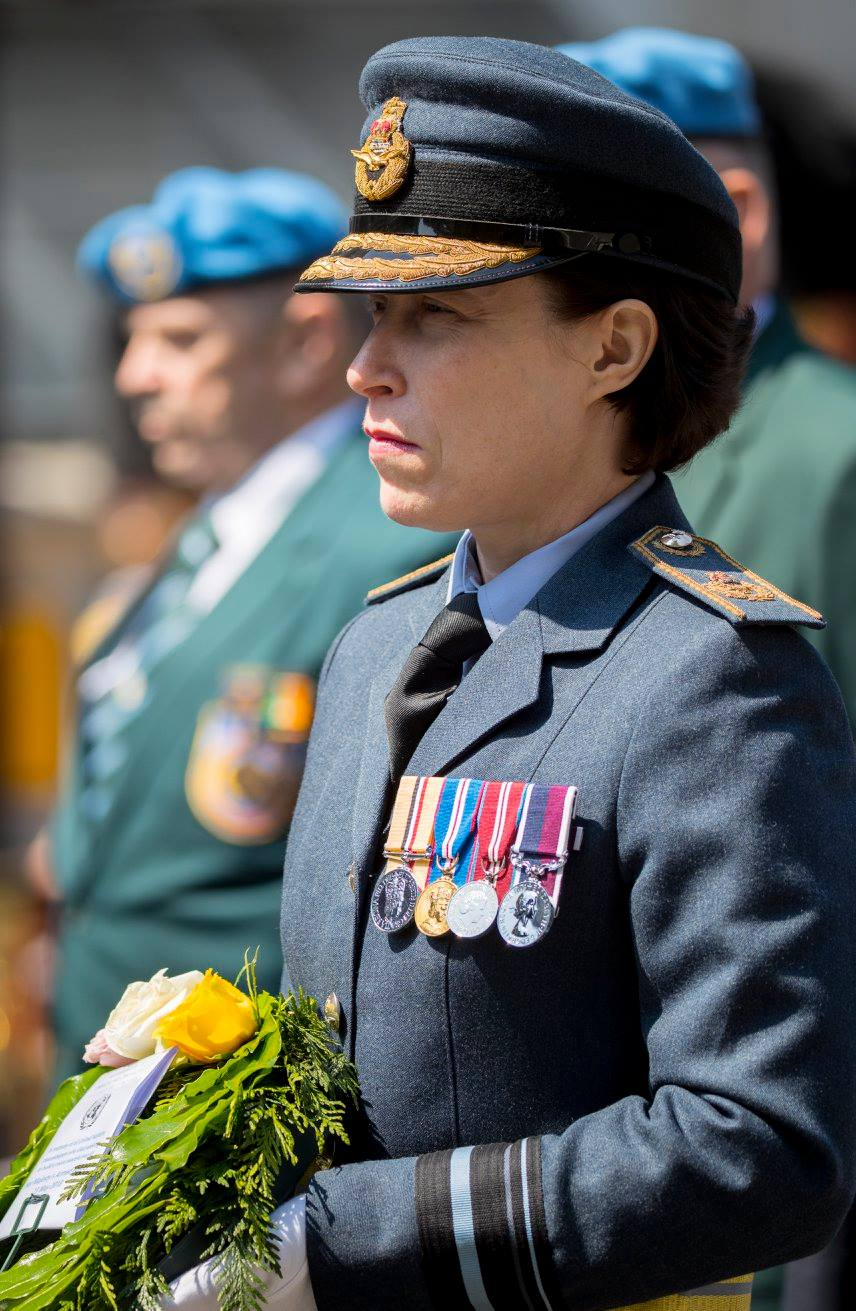
- Air Vice-Marshal Mardell in 2018
- Born: 23 September 1968 (age 58); Bewdley, Worcestershire, England
- Military career
- Allegiance: United Kingdom
- Branch: Royal Air Force
- Service years: 1997–2019
- Rank: Air Vice-Marshal
- Conflicts: Iraq War

Air Vice-Marshal Alison Mardell (born 23 September 1968) is a British solicitor and retired Royal Air Force (RAF) officer. From 2017 to 2019, she has served as Director of Legal Services (RAF) and head of the RAF Legal Branch.

== Early life and education ==
Mardell was born on 23 September 1968 in Bewdley, Worcestershire, England. She studied law at Bristol Polytechnic, graduating with a Bachelor of Laws (LLB) degree. She studied for the Law Society's Final Examination at Birmingham Polytechnic, and was admitted as a solicitor on 17 October 1994.

Mardell continued her studies after joining the Royal Air Force. She studied international law at the University of Bristol, graduating with a Master of Laws (LLM) degree in 2003. While attending the Joint Services Command and Staff College, she studied for a Master of Arts (MA) degree in defence studies from King's College London, which she completed in 2009.

== Military career ==
On 6 February 1997, Mardell was commissioned into the Legal Branch of the Royal Air Force (RAF) as a flight lieutenant. She then worked as a legal adviser at the Joint Force Air Component Headquarters. She was promoted to squadron leader on 6 February 2001. In 2003, as part of Operation TELIC 1, she was deployed to Iraq: she was the first RAF lawyer to be deployed to that theatre. After returning to the United Kingdom, she was posted as legal advisor to the Air Warfare Centre. She was promoted to wing commander on 6 February 2007. She attended the Advanced Command and Staff Course at the Joint Services Command and Staff College in Shrivenham, Oxfordshire. She was promoted to group captain on 1 January 2011. She was then posted as Command Legal Adviser to Headquarters Air Command.

In February 2014, Mardell was appointed Deputy Director of Legal Services (RAF) and promoted to air commodore. On 29 April 2017, she was appointed Director Legal Services (RAF) and promoted to air vice-marshal. As such, she was head of the RAF Legal Branch, principal legal adviser to the Chief of the Air Staff and the Air Force Board, and attended the Air Force Board Standing Committee. Mardell retired on 7 February 2019.

== Honours ==
In 2002, Mardell was awarded the Queen's Golden Jubilee Medal, a commemorative medal awarded to active personnel in the British Armed Forces who had completed 5 years of qualifying service. She was awarded the Iraq Medal without clasp in 2003. In 2012, she was awarded the Queen's Diamond Jubilee Medal. She has been awarded the RAF Long Service and Good Conduct Medal, a long service medal recognising 15 years service: she qualified for this medal in 2012, but was only awarded it in 2016 when the criteria were changed to make officers eligible.

Military offices
Preceded by Lindsay Irvine	Director of Legal Services (RAF); 2017 to 2019	Succeeded by Tamara Jennings
