= David Parry-Evans =

Royal Air Force Air Chief Marshal (1935–2020)

Sir David Parry-Evans
- Born: 19 July 1935
- Died: 25 August 2020 (aged 85)
- Military career
- Allegiance: United Kingdom
- Branch: Royal Air Force
- Service years: 1956–1991
- Rank: Air Chief Marshal
- Commands: Air Member for Personnel (1989–1991); RAF Germany (1985–1987); No. 38 Group (1984–1985); No. 1 Group (1982–1984); RAF Staff College, Bracknell (1981–1982); RAF Marham (c.1975–1978); No. 214 Squadron (1974–1975)
- Awards: Knight Grand Cross of the Order of the Bath; Commander of the Order of the British Empire

Air Chief Marshal Sir David George Parry-Evans, GCB, CBE (19 July 1935 – 25 August 2020) was a senior Royal Air Force commander.

== RAF career ==
Educated at Berkhamsted School, Parry-Evans joined the Royal Air Force in 1956. He became Officer Commanding No. 214 Squadron in 1974 and Station Commander at RAF Marham in 1975. He was appointed Director of Defence Policy at the Ministry of Defence in 1979, Commandant of the RAF Staff College, Bracknell, in 1981 and then Air Officer Commanding No. 1 Group at RAF Bawtry in 1982, before becoming Air Officer Commanding No. 38 Group in 1984.

He went on to be Commander-in-Chief RAF Germany and Second Tactical Air Force in 1985, Deputy Chief of the Defence Staff (Programmes and Personnel) in 1987 and Air Member for Personnel in 1989 before retiring in 1991. In retirement he became President of the Shackleton Association.

== Family ==
In 1960, he married Ann Reynolds; they had two sons.

Parry-Evans died on 25 August 2020, at the age of 85, following a short illness.

Military offices
Preceded by Michael Beavis	Commandant of the RAF Staff College, Bracknell; 1981–1982	Succeeded by Anthony Skingsley
Preceded by Sir Patrick Hine	Commander-in-Chief RAF Germany; Also Commander of the Second Tactical Air Force; 1985–1987	Succeeded by Sir Anthony Skingsley
Preceded by Sir John Chapple	Deputy Chief of the Defence Staff (Programmes and Personnel); 1987–1989	Succeeded by Sir Barry Wilson
Preceded by Sir Laurence Jones	Air Member for Personnel; 1989–1991	Succeeded by Sir Roger Palin
