= List of serving senior officers of the Royal Marines =

This is a list of serving senior officers of the Royal Marines. It includes currently serving Royal Marine generals, lieutenant-generals, major-generals and brigadiers.

== Generals ==
Name	Photo	Appointment	Honours	Date of promotion	Ref
Sir Gwyn Jenkins		First Sea Lord and Chief of the Naval Staff; Commandant General Royal Marines	KCB, OBE, ADC	30 August 2022	
Sir Robert Andrew Magowan		Commander Cyber & Specialist Operations Command	KCB, CBE	3 March 2026	

== Lieutenant-Generals ==
Name	Photo	Appointment	Honours	Date of promotion	Ref

== Major-Generals ==
Name	Photo	Appointment	Honours	Date of promotion	Ref
Paul Patrick Lynch		Deputy Assistant Secretary General for Intelligence, NATO	CB, MC	7 August 2023	
Duncan G. Forbes		Chief of Staff, Military Strategic Headquarters		11 March 2024	
Richard John Cantrill		Commander Operations	OBE, MC	6 May 2024	
Philip Mark Totten		Director Naval Staff	CBE	28 May 2024	
Anthony R. Turner		Deputy Commander, Allied Special Operations Forces Command		17 June 2024	
Paul Andrew Maynard		Assistant Chief of the Naval Staff (Policy) & Deputy Commandant General Royal Marines	OBE ADC	26 March 2025	

== Brigadiers ==
Name	Photo	Appointment	Honours	Date of promotion	Ref
Michael John Tanner			OBE	20 February 2020	
Andrew R. Muddiman		Naval Regional Commander Scotland and Northern Ireland	ADC	2021	
Andrew P. L. Watkins		Deputy Director of Plans, United States Central Command		19 June 2023	
Christopher E. Haw		Director, Commando Force Programme	MC	25 September 2023	
Richard C. Morris			OBE	27 September 2023	
Benjamin E. Halsted		Deputy Commanding General Combined Joint Task Force - Operation Inherent Resolve	MBE	20 October 2023	
James A. Dennis		Assistant Chief of Staff Communications (J6), Permanent Joint Headquarters; Assistant Commandant General Royal Marines		6 November 2023	
Jonathan J. Sear		UK Defence Attaché to Germany		6 April 2024	
Jamie M. Norman		Commander, UK Commando Force	DSO, OBE	29 April 2024	
Richard Alston		Director of Integrated Effects, Ministry of Defence	OBE	23 September 2024	
Simon M. Rogers		Director Operational Advantage Centre	OBE	17 March 2025	
James A. E. Lewis		Assistant Chief of Staff, Crisis and Deliberate Planning (J5), Permanent Joint Headquarters	OBE	28 April 2025	
Andrew J. R. Dow				24 November 2025	
Innes C. Catton				1 June 2026	

== See also ==
- List of Royal Marines full generals
- List of serving senior officers of the Royal Navy
- List of serving senior officers of the British Army
- List of serving senior officers of the Royal Air Force
