= Roger Palin =

Royal Air Force Air Chief Marshal

Sir Roger Palin
- Born: 8 July 1938 (age 88)
- Military career
- Allegiance: United Kingdom
- Branch: British Army (1958–1963); Royal Air Force (1963–1993)
- Service years: 1958–1993
- Rank: Air Chief Marshal
- Commands: RAF Germany; No. 11 Group; No. 43 Squadron
- Awards: Knight Commander of the Order of the Bath; Officer of the Order of the British Empire; Queen's Commendation for Valuable Service in the Air

Air Chief Marshal Sir Roger Hewlett Palin, KCB, OBE (born 8 July 1938) is a former senior Royal Air Force commander.

== Early life and army career ==
Palin was educated at Canford School and St John's College, Cambridge. During his National Service, Palin served in the King's Royal Rifle Corps, being commissioned from cadet to second lieutenant on 10 May 1958. On 6 October 1959 he joined the Territorial Army portion of the Parachute Regiment, as a second lieutenant with seniority from 10 May 1958, and was promoted to lieutenant on 10 January 1960. On 1 February 1961 he was placed on the unattached list. On 1 February 1962 he rejoined The King's Royal Rifle Corps, Green Jackets Brigade, in the Army Emergency Reserve.

== RAF career ==
On 21 January 1963 Palin joined the Royal Air Force, being granted a permanent commission as a flying officer, with seniority from 1 November 1961. He was promoted to flight lieutenant on 1 May 1964, and to squadron leader on 1 January 1970. He served as Officer Commanding No. 43 Squadron.

On 3 June 1972 he was awarded the Queen's Commendation for Valuable Service in the Air. On 1 January 1975 he was promoted to wing commander. In the 1979 New Year Honours Palin was made an Officer of the Order of the British Empire (OBE). He was promoted to group captain on 1 January 1980. He then served as Aide-de-Camp to The Queen from 11 December 1981 until 10 December 1982. He was promoted to air commodore on 1 January 1984, and to air vice marshal on 1 January 1986.

He served as Air Officer Commanding, No. 11 Group from July 1987 until March 1989, and was promoted to air marshal on 14 April to serve as Commander-in-Chief RAF Germany and Second Tactical Air Force. In the 1989 Birthday Honours he was made a Knight Commander of the Order of the Bath (KCB). Palin then served as Air Member for Personnel from 1991 before retiring from the RAF on 1 July 1993.

Military offices
Preceded by Sir Michael Stear	Air Officer Commanding No. 11 Group; 1987–1989	Succeeded by Sir William Wratten
Preceded by Sir Anthony Skingsley	Commander-in-Chief RAF Germany; Also Commander of the Second Tactical Air Force; 1989–1991	Succeeded by Sir Andrew Wilson
Preceded by Sir David Parry-Evans	Air Member for Personnel; 1991–1993	Succeeded by Sir Andrew Wilson
