= Michael Stear =

Royal Air Force Air Marshal (1938–2020)

Sir Michael Stear
- Born: Michael James Douglas Stear; 11 October 1938
- Died: 5 January 2020 (aged 81)
- Military career
- Allegiance: United Kingdom
- Branch: Royal Air Force
- Service years: 1961–96
- Rank: Air Chief Marshal
- Service number: 5011693
- Units: No. 1 Squadron; No. 208 Squadron
- Commands: No. 18 Group (1989–92); No. 11 Group (1985–87); RAF Gütersloh (1980–82); No. 56 Squadron (1976); No. 17 Squadron (1974–76)
- Awards: Knight Commander of the Order of the Bath; Commander of the Order of the British Empire; Queen’s Commendation for Valuable Service in the Air

Air Chief Marshal Sir Michael James Douglas Stear, KCB, CBE, DL (11 October 1938 – 5 January 2020) was a senior commander of the Royal Air Force (RAF). He served as Deputy Commander in Chief, Allied Forces Central Europe from 1992 to 1996.

== Early life ==
Stear was educated at Monkton Combe School in Somerset where he gained his private pilot's licence, and began his National Service in 1957. From 1959 he attended the University of Cambridge where he joined the Cambridge University Air Squadron (part of the Royal Air Force Volunteer Reserve), being commissioned as an acting pilot officer on 10 May 1961. After completing his degree, he joined the Royal Air Force, and was granted a permanent commission as a pilot officer on 1 October 1962, relinquishing his RAFVR commission the same day.

== RAF career ==
Stear served as a pilot with No. 1 Squadron after completing flying training, and was promoted to flying officer on 1 April 1963, and to flight lieutenant on 1 January 1964.

In 1967, he joined No. 208 Squadron and saw action in the Persian Gulf. Awarded the Queen's Commendation for Valuable Service in the Air in 1969, Stear began a three-year period of service in the United States Air Force as part of an officer exchange programme later that year. He was promoted to squadron leader on 1 January 1970.

On his return to the UK in 1972 he was posted to the Air Secretary's Branch at the Ministry of Defence, and in 1974 was posted to Germany as Officer Commanding No. 17 Squadron. He was promoted to wing commander on 1 July 1974. In 1976, after short-term posting as Officer Commanding No. 56 Squadron at RAF Wattisham, he was appointed Personal Staff Officer to the Chief of Air Staff, Ministry of Defence.

Stear was promoted to group captain on 1 July 1979, and in 1980 returned to Germany as Officer Commanding RAF Gütersloh. In 1982 he became Assistant Chief of Staff (Operations), HQ Second Allied Tactical Air Force and, with the advent of the Falklands War, posted as Air Commodore Plans, HQ Strike Command. Appointed a Commander of the Order of the British Empire in the 1982 Birthday Honours, he was promoted to air commodore on 1 July 1983, and to air vice marshal on 1 July 1985. He served as Air Officer Commanding (AOC) No. 11 Group from 1 August 1985 until 15 July 1987, then as Assistant Chief of Defence Staff (NATO/UK). He was promoted to air marshal on 25 October 1989, to serve as AOC No. 18 Group and Commander Maritime Air Eastern Atlantic and Channel. Stear was knighted as a Knight Commander of the Order of the Bath in the 1990 New Year Honours. He was promoted to air chief marshal on 27 August 1992, and a year later was appointed Deputy Commander in Chief, Allied Forces Central Europe.

== Retirement ==
Stear retired from the RAF on 11 October 1996, and on the same day was commissioned into the Royal Air Force Volunteer Reserve (Training Branch) as a flying officer for a period of four years. He was twice granted an extension of service, first until 10 October 2003, and then until 10 October 2007, when he finally relinquished his RAFVR(T) commission at the age of 68. Stear also maintained his links with the Air Force by becoming President of the Royal Air Forces Association in 1998. In 2000, he was appointed a deputy lieutenant for the County of Devon.

He died on 5 January 2020 at the age of 81.

Military offices
Preceded by Sir Kenneth Hayr	Air Officer Commanding No. 11 Group; 1985–1987	Succeeded by Sir Roger Palin
Preceded by Sir Barry Duxbury	Air Officer Commanding No. 18 Group; 1989–1992	Succeeded by Sir John Harris
Preceded by Sir Anthony Skingsley	Deputy Commander-in-Chief Allied Forces Central Europe; 1993–1998	Succeeded by Christopher Coville
