= Peter Furniss =

Royal Air Force air marshal

Peter Furniss DFC
- Born: 16 July 1919; West Kirby, Cheshire, England
- Died: 11 December 2005 (aged 86)
- Military career
- Allegiance: United Kingdom
- Branch: British Army; Royal Air Force
- Service years: 1938 – 1946; 1950 – 1982
- Rank: Air Vice-Marshal
- Service number: 47829
- Conflicts: World War II: Battle of Tunisia; Allied invasion of Sicily; Allied invasion of Italy
- Awards: Distinguished Flying Cross (1944)

Air Vice-Marshal Peter Furniss, DFC (16 July 1919 – 11 December 2005) was a British solicitor and senior Royal Air Force officer. He served as Director of Legal Services (RAF) and head of the RAF Legal Branch from 1978 to 1982.

== Early life ==
Furniss was born on 16 July 1919 in West Kirby, Cheshire (now Merseyside), England. He was the youngest of nine children born to a solicitor. He was educated at Sedbergh School, a public boarding school in Cumbria. At school, he excelled at sport, and became a cadet corporal in the Junior Division of the Officers' Training Corps.

== Early career and war service ==
After leaving school, Furniss became an articled clerk at a solicitors firm in Liverpool. In 1938, he joined the Liverpool Scottish, a Territorial Army regiment affiliated to the Queen's Own Cameron Highlanders, as a soldier.

With World War II looking likely, he left the solicitors firm without completing his training contract to commence officer training. He was commissioned into the British Army as a second lieutenant on 3 May 1939. On 31 January 1942, he was granted the rank of pilot officer (temporary) while serving with the Royal Air Force. He was promoted to flying officer (war substantive) on 1 October 1942. Having transferred to the RAF, he underwent training as a tactical reconnaissance pilot. In March 1943, he joined No. 241 Squadron RAF in Tunisia. With them he flew a Hurricane as part of reconnaissance support for the First Army during the Battle of Tunisia.

After victory occurred in North Africa in May 1943, he transferred to No. 154 Squadron RAF based in Malta to fly Spitfires. From the island, he undertook patrols during the Allied invasion of Sicily from July to August 1943. He was wounded when his Spitfire was attacked by a German fighter plane during a landing onto an allied airstrip in Malta. He flew patrols during the Allied invasion of Italy and on 9 September he shot down a German Focke-Wulf Fw 190 over Salerno. He also shared in the destruction of a Dornier Do 217 bomber. He was promoted to flight lieutenant (war substantive) on 31 January 1944.

== Honours and decorations ==
On 29 December 1944, Furniss was awarded the Distinguished Flying Cross (DFC).
