= Edward Stringer =

Royal Air Force officer

Air Marshal Edward Stringer CB CBE
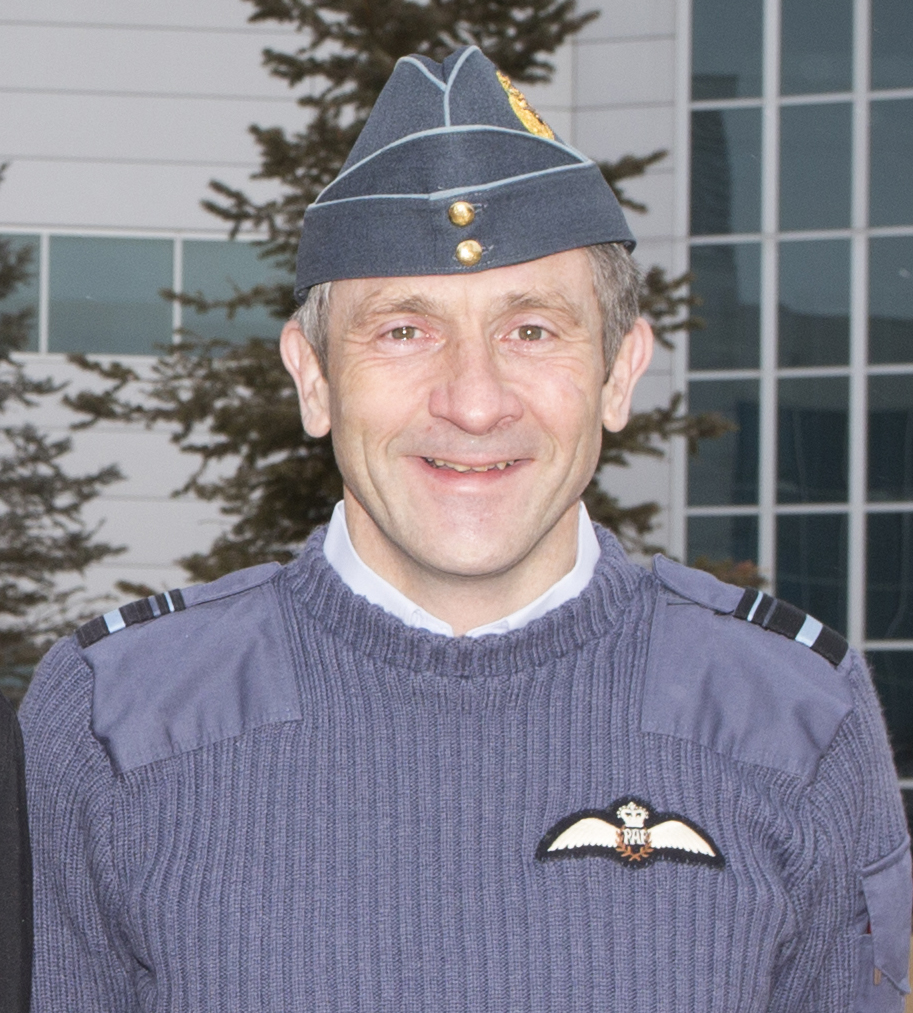
- Air Vice-Marshal Stringer in 2017
- Military career
- Allegiance: United Kingdom
- Branch: Royal Air Force
- Service years: 1982–2021
- Rank: Air Marshal
- Nickname: Ted
- Commands: Air Warfare Centre; No. 904 Expeditionary Air Wing; RAF Leeming; No. 54 Squadron
- Conflicts: Gulf War; Operation Southern Watch; Iraq War; Operation Unified Protector
- Awards: Companion of the Order of the Bath; Commander of the Order of the British Empire

Air Marshal Edward Jackson Stringer, CB, CBE is a retired Royal Air Force officer. From April 2018 to 2021 he served as Director-General of the Defence Academy. He also served as Director-General of Joint Force Development, Strategic Command from April 2018 to March 2021. He served as Assistant Chief of the Air Staff from April 2013 to January 2015, and as Assistant Chief of the Defence Staff (Operations) from March 2015 to 2018.

== Early life ==
Stringer studied engineering at the University of Liverpool, and graduated with a Bachelor of Engineering degree in 1985. Later he studied international relations at King's College London and completed a Master of Arts degree in 2010.

== Military career ==
Stringer was commissioned into the General Duties Branch of the Royal Air Force on 5 September 1982 as an acting pilot officer. He was regraded to pilot officer on 15 July 1985 with seniority from 15 April 1984. Following flying training, he was posted to the Jaguar Force. He then became a Qualified Weapons Instructor. He was promoted to flying officer on 15 January 1986 with seniority from 15 October 1984, and to flight lieutenant on 15 April 1987. He saw active service in the Gulf War of 1990 to 1991.

On 1 January 1995, he was promoted to squadron leader as part of the half yearly promotions. Between April and September 1999, he was posted to the Gulf as part of Operation Southern Watch to maintain the Iraqi no-fly zones, for which he was appointed a Member of the Order of the British Empire "in recognition of [his] gallant and distinguished services".

Stringer became officer commanding No. 54 Squadron, in which capacity he was deployed as Jaguar Force Commander for the invasion of Iraq in 2003. He was advanced to Officer of the Order of the British Empire in the 2003 Birthday Honours.

He became Station Commander at RAF Leeming and then commanding officer of No. 904 Expeditionary Air Wing based at Kandahar in 2008. Advanced to Commander of the Order of the British Empire in the 2009 New Year Honours,

Stringer was appointed Commandant of the Air Warfare Centre later that year. In this role he was deployed as Air Contingent Commander for the NATO Operation in Libya (Operation Unified Protector). He went on to be Liaison Officer to the Chairman of the Joint Chiefs of Staff in Washington, D.C., in October 2012.

On 5 April 2013, Stringer was promoted to air vice marshal and appointed Assistant Chief of the Air Staff. In January 2015, he was succeeded in that role by Rich Knighton. In March 2015, he was appointed Assistant Chief of the Defence Staff (Operations).

He was appointed Companion of the Order of the Bath in the 2017 Birthday Honours. On 11 April 2018, he was promoted to air marshal and appointed Director General of the Defence Academy and of Joint Force Development, Joint Forces Command, now Strategic Command. He was succeeded in the role of Director General of Joint Force Development, Strategic Command, by Ian Gale in April 2021 and retired from the Air Force in August 2021.

Military offices
Preceded by Barry North	Assistant Chief of the Air Staff; 2013–2015	Succeeded by Rich Knighton
Preceded by Duncan Potts	Director General of the Defence Academy; 2018–2021	Succeeded by Ian Gale
