= Anthony Skingsley =

Royal Air Force Air Chief Marshal (1933–2019)

Air Chief Marshal Sir Anthony Skingsley GBE KCB
- Born: 19 October 1933
- Died: 15 January 2019 (aged 85)
- Military career
- Allegiance: United Kingdom
- Branch: Royal Air Force
- Service years: 1955–1992
- Rank: Air Chief Marshal
- Commands: Allied Air Forces Central Europe (1989–93); RAF Germany (1987–89); Air Member for Personnel (1986–87); RAF Staff College, Bracknell (1983–84); RAF Laarbruch (1974–76); No. 214 Squadron (1972–74)
- Awards: Knight Grand Cross of the Order of the British Empire; Knight Commander of the Order of the Bath; Queen's Commendation for Valuable Service in the Air

Air Chief Marshal Sir Anthony Gerald Skingsley, GBE, KCB (19 October 1933 – 15 January 2019) was a senior Royal Air Force commander.

== RAF career ==
Educated at St Bartholomew's School, Newbury, Berkshire and St Catharine's College, Cambridge, Skingsley joined the Royal Air Force in 1955. He became officer commanding No. 214 Squadron in 1972, Station Commander at RAF Laarbruch in 1974 and Assistant Chief of Staff (Air Offensive) at Headquarters Second Tactical Air Force in 1977 before becoming Director of Air Plans at the Ministry of Defence in 1979.

He went on to be Assistant Chief of Staff (Plans and Policy) at SHAPE in 1980, Commandant of the RAF Staff College, Bracknell, in 1983 and Assistant Chief of the Air Staff in 1985. He was then Air Member for Personnel from 1986, Commander-in-Chief of RAF Germany and Second Tactical Air Force from 1987 and Deputy Commander-in-Chief AFCENT from 1989 before retiring in 1992.

== Personal life ==
In 1957 Skingsley married Lilwen Dixon; they had two sons and one daughter. He died on 15 January 2019, aged 85.

Military offices
Preceded by David Parry-Evans	Commandant of the RAF Staff College, Bracknell; 1983–1984	Succeeded by Alan White
New title	Assistant Chief of the Air Staff; 1985–1986	Succeeded by Michael Simmons
Preceded by Sir Thomas Kennedy	Air Member for Personnel; 1986–1987	Succeeded by Sir Laurence Jones
Preceded by Sir David Parry-Evans	Commander-in-Chief RAF Germany; Also Commander of the Second Tactical Air Force; 1987–1989	Succeeded by Sir Roger Palin
Preceded by Sir Joseph Gilbert	Deputy Commander-in-Chief Allied Forces Central Europe; 1989–1992	Succeeded by Sir Michael Stear
