= Assistant Chief of the Air Staff =

Senior appointment in the Royal Air Force

- Ensign of the Royal Air Force (ACAS Command Flag)

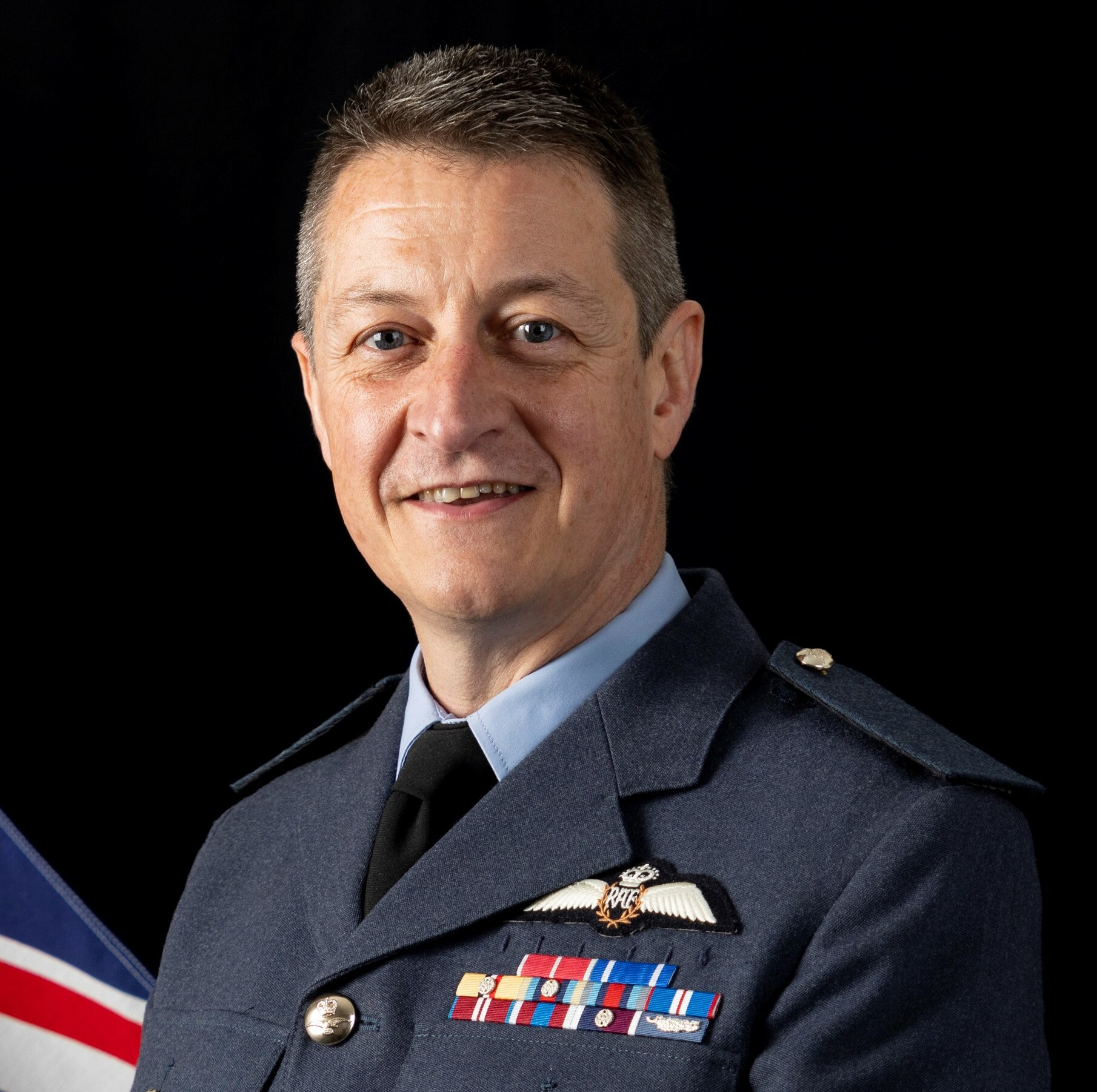
- Incumbent; Air Vice-Marshal Ian Townsend since November 2025
- Ministry of Defence
- Style: Air Vice-Marshal
- Abbreviation: ACAS
- Member of: Air Force Board; Civil Aviation Authority Board
- Reports to: Chief of the Air Staff
- Appointer: King Charles III
- Formation: c. April 1938
- First holder: Air Chief Marshal Sir Anthony Skingsley
- Website: Official website

The Assistant Chief of the Air Staff (ACAS) is a senior appointment in the Royal Air Force. The current ACAS is Air Vice-Marshal Ian Townsend.

The post was originally established circa February 1938, but without being made a member of the Air Council.

The ACAS post was re-established in 1985 by eliminating the Vice Chief of the Air Staff and combining the Policy and Operations two star assistant chiefs. In 1992, ACAS became a member of the Air Force Board. The ACAS is responsible for "assisting the Chief of the Air Staff in generating a balanced and integrated Royal Air Force capability and for maintaining the fighting effectiveness and morale of the Service including the development of policy." One of the many duties of the ACAS is to sit on the board of the Civil Aviation Authority as a non-executive member.

== Assistant Chiefs of the Air Staff from 1985 ==
- 1985–1986: Anthony Skingsley
- 1987–1989: Michael Simmons
- 1989–1991: John Thomson
- 1991–1992: Timothy Garden
- 1992–1994: Anthony Bagnall
- 1994–1996: Peter Squire
- 1996–1998: Timothy Jenner
- 1998–2000: Jock Stirrup
- 2000–2003: Philip Sturley
- 2003–2005: David Walker
- 2005–2007: Chris Moran
- 2007–2010: Tim Anderson
- 2010–2013: Barry North
- 2013–2015: Edward Stringer
- 2015–2017: Rich Knighton
- 2017–2018: Michael Wigston
- 2018–2019: Gerry Mayhew
- 2019–2021: Ian Gale
- 2021–2023: Simon Edwards
- 2023–2024: Tim Jones
- 2024–2025: Suraya Marshall
- 2025–present: Ian Townsend
