= Suraya Marshall =

British Royal Air Force officer (born 1973)

Air Marshal Suraya Marshall CBE
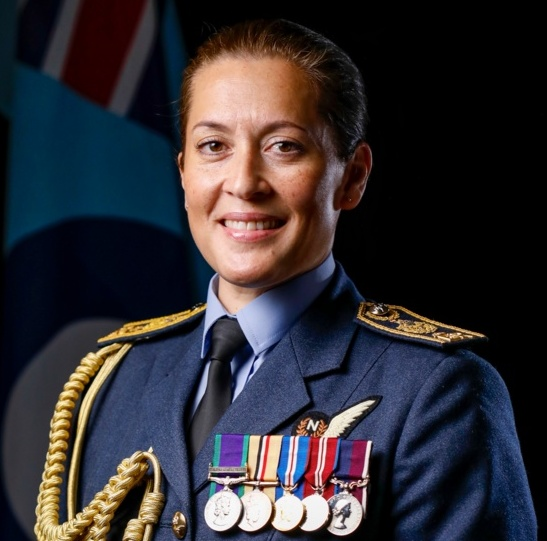
- Marshall in 2024
- Born: 1973 (age 52–53)
- Alma mater: University of Nottingham
- Spouse: Air Marshal Allan Marshall
- Military career
- Allegiance: United Kingdom
- Branch: Royal Air Force
- Service years: 1994–present
- Rank: Air Marshal
- Commands: No. 2 Group RAF; Royal Air Force College Cranwell; No. 55 Squadron RAF; No. 92 Squadron RAF
- Conflicts: Iraq War; War in Afghanistan
- Awards: Commander of the Order of the British Empire

Air Marshal Suraya Antonia Marshall, CBE (born 1973) is a senior Royal Air Force officer. She served as Air Officer Commanding No. 2 Group RAF from October 2021 to March 2024, Assistant Chief of the Air Staff from June 2024 to November 2025, and was appointed Deputy Commander Cyber & Specialist Operations Command in November 2025.

== Early life and education ==
Marshall born in 1973 in York, Yorkshire, England. She was educated at Queen Margaret's School, York, a private school. She then studied law at University of Nottingham, graduating with a Bachelor of Laws (LLB) degree in 1994. While at university, she was a member of the East Midlands University Air Squadron.

== Military career ==
Marshall joined the Royal Air Force (RAF) as a navigator, and was commissioned with the rank of pilot officer on 9 October 1994. She completed an MA from King's College London in 2000. She flew in the Tornado F3, and in 2000 became the first woman to pass the Qualified Weapons Instructor Course for the Tornado F3. She served as Officer Commanding of No. 92 Squadron RAF and No. 55 Squadron RAF. She was Director of Coalition Air Operations in the Middle East and Afghanistan during 2019.

In November 2019, Marshall was appointed Commandant of the Royal Air Force College Cranwell, the RAF's aircrew and officer training academy, holding the rank of air commodore. On 6 October 2021 she was promoted to air vice-marshal and appointed Air Officer Commanding No. 2 Group: she is the first woman to command one of the RAF's two operational groups. As of November 2021, she is the highest ranking BAME person in the British military. She was appointed a Commander of the Order of the British Empire in the 2022 Birthday Honours.

In May 2024, Marshall was announced as the next Assistant Chief of the Air Staff, in succession to Air Vice-Marshal Tim Jones. She took up the appointment in June 2024.

Marshall was promoted to air marshal and appointed Deputy Commander Cyber & Specialist Operations Command on 28 November 2025.

== Personal life ==
Marshall is married to Air Marshal Allan Marshall, and together they have two children.

== See also ==
- List of senior female officers of the British Armed Forces

Military offices
Preceded by Peter J. M. Squires	Commandant of the Royal Air Force College Cranwell; 2019–2021	Succeeded by Andrew Dickens
Preceded by Alan Gillespie	Air Officer Commanding No. 2 Group RAF; 2021–2024	Succeeded by Jason Appleton
Preceded by Tim Jones	Assistant Chief of the Air Staff; 2024–2025	Succeeded by Ian Townsend
Preceded by Sir Tom Copinger-Symes	Deputy Commander Cyber & Specialist Operations Command; 2025–present	Incumbent
