= Tamara Jennings =

Senior Royal Air Force legal officer

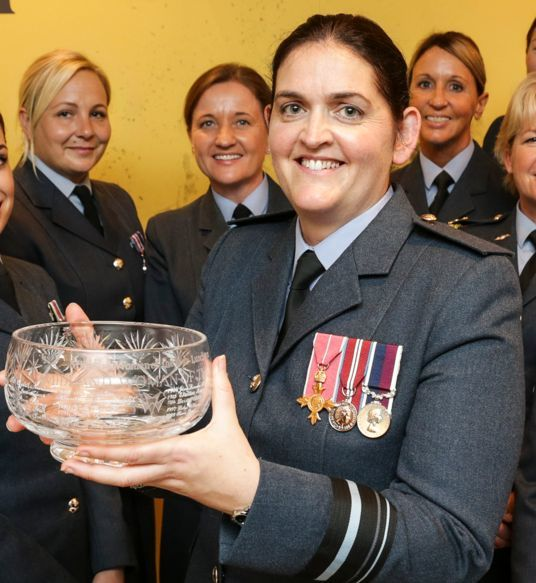
- Jennings in 2018
- Military career
- Allegiance: United Kingdom
- Branch: Royal Air Force
- Service years: 2000–present
- Rank: Air Vice-Marshal
- Unit: RAF Legal Branch
- Awards: Companion of the Order of the Bath; Officer of the Order of the British Empire

Air Vice-Marshal Tamara Nancy Jennings, CB, OBE (born in 1973) is a British solicitor and senior Royal Air Force officer. Since November 2024, she has been deputy commandant of the Royal College of Defence Studies. She served as director of Legal Services and head of the RAF Legal Branch from 2018 to 2024.

== Early life ==
Her father grew up at 12 Chapel Street, Ruskington, attending the village secondary modern school. He joined the RAF as an apprentice in 1965, aged 16.

Her parents married on Saturday 20 June 1970 at RAF Cranwell. Her mother, a nurse, was from an RAF background, and attended Impington Village College in Cambridgeshire.

Her father coached RAF football teams, and played for Billinghay. Her father was commissioned in February 1986.

Jennings was born on 27 August 1973 in Akrotiri, Cyprus, the daughter of Nigel John Quincey and Janet Mary Quincey. She attended Kesteven and Sleaford High School and Lady Manners School. She took part in competitive swimming, and lived at 1 Nene Close, in Ruskington.

She received an LLB from the Northumbria University and an MA from King's College London. She was admitted as a solicitor in July 1998, and went on to practice law in Newcastle upon Tyne.

== RAF career ==
On 25 May 2000, Jennings was commissioned into the RAF Legal Branch of the Royal Air Force (RAF) with the rank of flight lieutenant. She moved from a short service to a permanent commission on 19 April 2004, allowing her to serve in the RAF until retirement. She was promoted to squadron leader on 25 May 2004, and to wing commander on 25 May 2010. She has worked at HQ Personnel and Training Command, HQ Strike Command, RAF Brize Norton, and HQ Air Command.

In 2017, Jennings was promoted to air commodore. She served as Deputy Director Legal Services (RAF) from May 2017 to 2018. On 29 September 2018, she was appointed Director of Legal Services (RAF) and promoted to air vice-marshal. Since November 2024, she has been deputy commandant of the Royal College of Defence Studies.

In the 2015 Queen's Birthday Honours, Jennings was appointed an Officer of the Order of the British Empire (OBE). She was awarded the Royal Air Force Long Service and Good Conduct Medal in 2018, and was appointed a Companion of the Order of the Bath (CB) in the 2025 New Year Honours.

Military offices
Preceded by Alison Mardell	Director of Legal Services (RAF); 2018 to present	Incumbent
