= Ian Townsend =

Officer of the British Royal Air Force

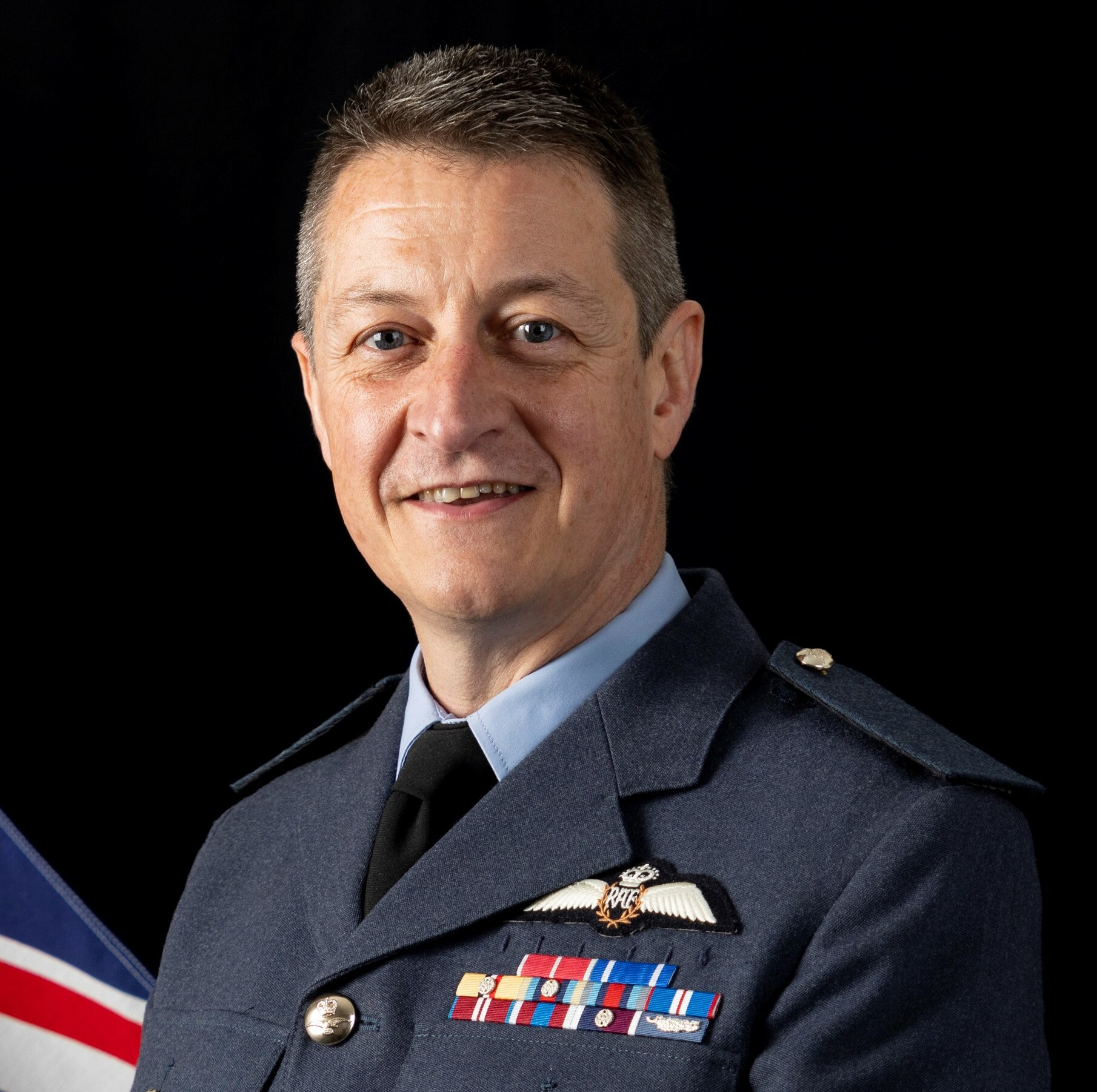
- Air Vice Marshal Townsend
- Military career
- Allegiance: United Kingdom
- Branch: Royal Air Force
- Service years: 1992–present
- Rank: Air Vice Marshal
- Nickname: "Cab"
- Commands: No. 22 Group RAF; No. 903 Expeditionary Air Wing; RAF Marham
- Conflicts: Iraq War; War in Afghanistan; War against the Islamic State
- Awards: Commander of the Order of the British Empire; Queen's Commendation for Valuable Service

Air Vice Marshal Ian Jon Townsend CBE is a senior Royal Air Force officer. He was the officer commanding RAF Marham from 2017 to 2019, the Air Officer Commanding No. 22 Group RAF from May 2023 to November 2025, and currently serves as the Assistant Chief of the Air Staff.

== RAF career ==
Townsend was commissioned into the Royal Air Force (RAF) on 30 July 1992. After initial pilot training, he was assigned to No. IV Squadron, which then flew the Harrier GR7. He became a Qualified Weapons Instructor in 2000. With his squadron he undertook tours in the Balkans (1998), Iraq War in 2003, and during the War in Afghanistan.

He became station commander at RAF Marham in July 2017. He was then commander of No. 903 Expeditionary Air Wing at RAF Akrotiri in September 2019, before becoming Assistant Chief of Staff, Capability Strategy at RAF Air Command in December 2021. He took command of No. 22 Group RAF in May 2023. In November 2025, he was appointed Assistant Chief of the Air Staff.

Townsend was awarded a Queen's Commendation for Valuable Service in 2003 and appointed a Commander of the Order of the British Empire in the 2020 Birthday Honours.

Military offices
Preceded by Richard Maddison	Air Officer Commanding No. 22 Group; 2023–2025	Succeeded by Ian Sharrocks
Preceded by Suraya Marshall	Assistant Chief of the Air Staff; 2025–present	Incumbent
