= Jason Appleton =

Senior RAF officer

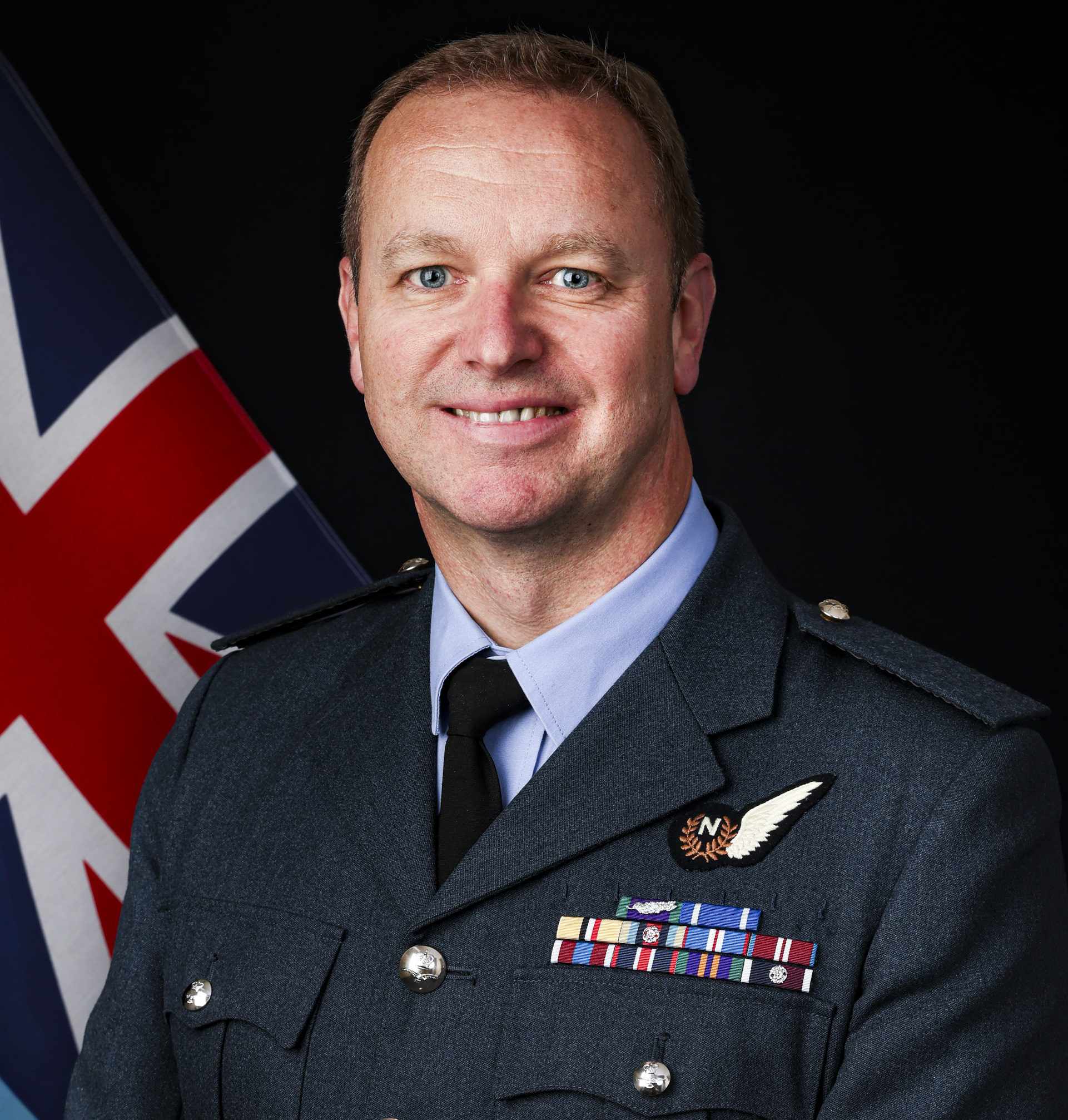
- Appleton in 2024
- Military career
- Allegiance: United Kingdom
- Branch: Royal Air Force
- Service years: 1991–present
- Rank: Air Vice Marshal
- Commands: No. 2 Group RAF (2024–); RAF Shawbury (2015–17); No. 28 (Army Cooperation) Squadron (2010–13)
- Conflicts: Operation Banner; Iraq War; War in Afghanistan
- Awards: Queen’s Commendation for Valuable Service

Air Vice Marshal Jason Appleton is a senior Royal Air Force officer.

== Military career ==
Appleton was commissioned into the Royal Air Force (RAF) in January 1991. After qualifying as a navigator, he became officer commanding No. 28 (Army Cooperation) Squadron. He went on to be station commander at RAF Shawbury in August 2015, Assistant Head Commitments, Joint Helicopter Command in May 2017 and Deputy Chief of Staff, Support at Allied Air Command in July 2019. After that he was appointed Transformation Programme Director at RAF Air Command in September 2022 and Air Officer Commanding No. 2 Group RAF in March 2024.

Military offices
Preceded by Suraya Marshall	Air Officer Commanding No. 2 Group RAF; 2024–present	Incumbent
