= Alex Turner (British Army officer) =

Senior British Army ofiicer

Major General Alex Turner CBE DSO
- Education: Eton College; King's College London
- Military career
- Allegiance: United Kingdom
- Branch: British Army
- Service years: 1998–present
- Rank: Major General
- Unit: Irish Guards
- Conflicts: War in Afghanistan
- Awards: Commander of the Order of the British Empire; Companion of the Distinguished Service Order

Major General Ian Alexander Jonathan Turner CBE DSO is a senior British Army officer.

== Early life and education ==
Turner was educated at Eton College, an all-boys public school (i.e. independent boarding school). He undertook a degree in war studies at King's College, London.

== Military career ==
Turner was commissioned into the Irish Guards on 12 December 1998. In 2011, he served in tour in Afghanistan as officer commanding No 2 Company, 1st Battalion Irish Guards. He also deployed to Afghanistan to assist with the formation of the Afghan National Army officer training academy in 2013 to 2014. He became commanding officer of 1st Battalion, Irish Guards in 2014, an operational planner at Permanent Joint Headquarters in 2017, and head of strategy at Army Headquarters in 2019. After that he was appointed commander 77th Brigade in 2020 and Director Army Futures in October 2023.

He was appointed a Companion of the Distinguished Service Order for his service in the Nahr-e Saraj district of Helmand Province in September 2011 and a Commander of the Order of the British Empire for services in the field on 31 December 2024.

Military offices
Preceded by Tim Jones	Assistant Chief of the Defence Staff (Capability & Force Design); 2025–present	Incumbent
