= Tim Jones (RAF officer) =

RAF officer

Air Marshal Tim Jones CBE
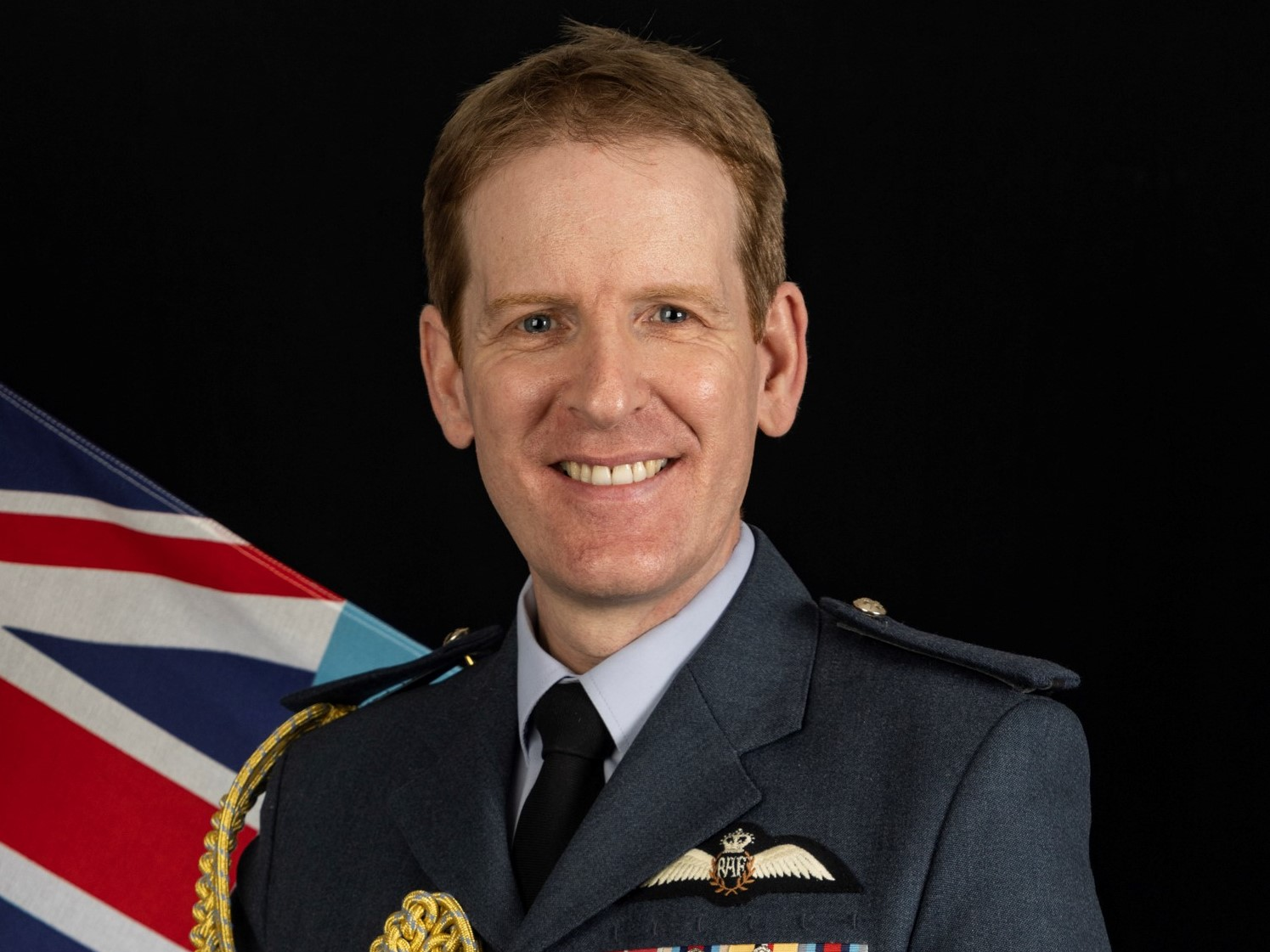
- Alma mater: Inverkeithing High School; University of Edinburgh; Royal College of Defence Studies
- Military career
- Allegiance: United Kingdom
- Branch: Royal Air Force
- Service years: 1995–present
- Rank: Air Marshal
- Commands: RAF Brize Norton; No. 24 Squadron
- Conflicts: Iraq War; War in Afghanistan; Operation Shader
- Awards: Commander of the Order of the British Empire

Air Marshal Timothy Telfer Jones, CBE is a senior officer in the Royal Air Force, currently serving as Deputy Chief of the Defence Staff (Force Development).

== Early life and education ==
Jones was born in Scotland. He attended Inverkeithing High School before graduating from the University of Edinburgh.

== RAF career ==
Jones joined the Royal Air Force on 8 October 1995. He qualified as a pilot and saw active service flying Hercules C-130 aircraft during the Iraq War and War in Afghanistan. He became station commander at RAF Brize Norton in 2016, and, after attending the Royal College of Defence Studies, Component Commander in the Middle East in 2018 and head of air resources and plans at RAF Air Command in 2020.

He went on to become Assistant Chief of the Air Staff in 2023, and Assistant Chief of the Defence Staff (Capability & Force Design) in June 2024. He was promoted to air marshal on 1 September 2025, on appointment as Deputy Chief of the Defence Staff, Force Development.

Jones was appointed a Commander of the Order of the British Empire in the 2019 New Year Honours.

=== Ribbon bar ===
Military offices
Preceded by Simon Edwards	Assistant Chief of the Air Staff; 2023–2024	Succeeded by Suraya Marshall
Preceded by David Eastman	Assistant Chief of the Defence Staff (Capability & Force Design); 2024–2025	Succeeded by Alex Turner
Preceded by Sir Robert Magowan	Deputy Chief of the Defence Staff (Force Development); 2025–present	Incumbent
