= Paul Carroll (Royal Navy officer) =

Royal Navy Rear Admiral (born 1972)

Rear Admiral Paul Carroll OBE
- Born: 1972 (age 53–54)
- Military career
- Allegiance: United Kingdom
- Branch: Royal Navy
- Service years: 1991–present
- Rank: Rear-Admiral
- Awards: OBE (2020)

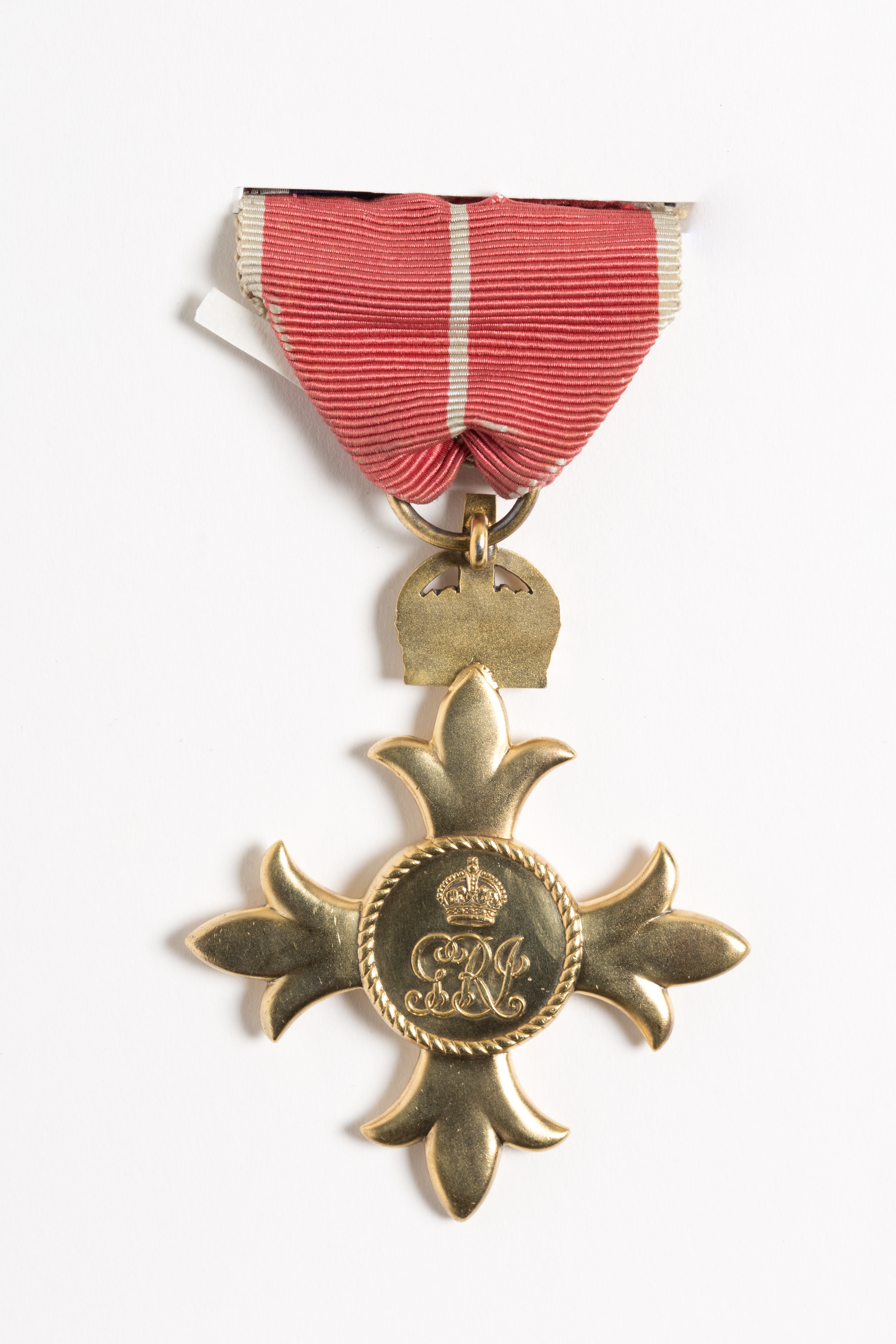
OBE insignia

Rear Admiral Paul Christopher Carroll, OBE (born 1972), is a senior Royal Navy officer who currently serves as Director of Submarine Acquisition at the UK Ministry of Defence.

== Naval career ==
After graduating from Britannia Royal Naval College at Dartmouth, Carroll was commissioned into the Royal Navy in 1991, and served on the Royal Navy flagship, HMS Ark Royal as a Commander. Promoted to Captain on 6 October 2014, then Commodore in 2018, he became Rear Admiral on 2 August 2021, and Director of Innovation and Future Capability at MoD Defence Equipment and Support. Since 2024, he serves as Director of Submarine Acquisition.

== Honours and awards ==

Rear-Admiral Carroll was appointed OBE in the 2020 Birthday Honours, as well as receiving other decorations.

A Freeman of the City of London, in 2011 Carroll became a Liveryman of the Shipwrights' Company.
