= RAF Legal Services =

Royal Air Force Legal Services
- Badge of the Royal Air Force Legal Services
- Founded: 28 June 1923 (as a department of the Judge Advocate General), 1 October 1948 (as the Directorate of Legal Services (RAF))
- Country: United Kingdom
- Branch: Royal Air Force
- Role: Legal service
- Size: Approx. 45 Commissioned Officers
- Headquarters: RAF High Wycombe
- Motto: Fortius si iuste (Latin) ("The stronger if conducted justly")

Commanders
- Director Legal Services: Air Vice-Marshal Mark Phelps

Insignia
- Logo

- Tactical Recognition Flash

The Royal Air Force Legal Services (RAFLS), also known as the Directorate of Legal Services (Royal Air Force) (DLS (RAF)), is the uniformed legal service provider for the Royal Air Force (RAF). It consists of solicitors and barristers qualified in either England and Wales, Scotland or Northern Ireland. The RAFLS is headquartered at Air Command RAF High Wycombe.

== History ==
The original RAF Legal Branch was established on 28 June 1923, and was attached to the department of the Judge Advocate General. It wasn't until 1 October 1948 that the Directorate of Legal Services (RAF) was formed, independent of the Judge Advocate General’s Office. In 2022, as part of the RAF's reorganisation, the RAF Legal Branch became the RAF Legal Services.

The first RAF legal officer to deploy on operations did not occur until October 1990 during Operation Granby (British military operations during the Second Gulf War), when then Wing Commander Richard Anthony Charles was sent to HQ British Forces Middle East in Riyadh, Saudi Arabia. The deployment of Charles (a future Director of Legal Services) meant that for the first time a sitting legal officer was advising senior commanders on the Rules of Engagement, Targeting, Prisoner of War Handling and other issues during live operations.

Since Charles' initial deployment, RAF legal officers have continued to provide legal advice to operational commanders on a range of legal issues associated with combat and non-combat operations.

While it is not a prerequisite for RAFLS legal officers to have any flying experience, a number of its members in its early years transferred to the branch following initial roles as pilots. Of particular note is Air Vice-Marshal Peter Furniss, who flew both Hurricanes and Spitfires during World War II, actions for which he was awarded the Distinguished Flying Cross (DFC) before later serving as the RAF's Director of Legal Services.

== Role ==
The RAFLS' mission is to deliver "high quality, effective and operationally focussed legal services to the Royal Air Force and Defence." It has around 45 legal officers; approximately one third are based overseas. The type of work undertaken by legal officers depends on the tour to which they are posted. Responsibilities include advising on domestic and international humanitarian law, aviation and space law, service discipline, criminal law, employment law, health and safety and environmental law, and administrative law and policy. Legal officers also deliver legal training across the full breadth of ranks and specialisations within the RAF. The RAFLS, alongside the Army Legal Services (ALS) and Navy Legal Services, also provides a number of legal officers to the Service Prosecuting Authority, where they serve as prosecutors for the military when conducting courts-martial.

== Eligibility ==
The RAFLS only recruits qualified solicitors and barristers; it does not accept applicants from legal executives.

== Director Legal Services (RAF) ==
The head of the RAF Legal Services is the Director of Legal Services (RAF). They are the principal legal adviser to the Chief of the Air Staff and Air Force Board and are invited to attend the Air Force Board Standing Committee to provide a legal perspective. The current holder is Air Vice-Marshal Mark Phelps.

=== Directors Legal Services (RAF) ===
- Air Commodore John Bankes Walmsley (from 1 October 1948 as Group Captain, from 1 January 1950 to 1 January 1958 as Air Commodore)
- Air Commodore Marshall William Palmer (1 January 1958 to 1 July 1962)
- Air Vice-Marshal John Ernest Allen-Jones (1 July 1962 to 31 October 1970)
- Air Vice-Marshal Aubrey Sidney-Wilmot (31 October 1970 to 16 January 1979)
- Air Vice-Marshal Peter Furniss (16 January 1979 to 30 January 1982)
- Air Vice-Marshal Graham Neil Forman (30 January 1982 to 4 August 1989)
- Air Vice-Marshal Reginald Thomas Dawson (4 August 1989 to 5 January 1993)
- Air Vice-Marshal Geoffrey W Carleton (5 January 1993 to 1 July 1997)
- Air Vice-Marshal John Weeden (1 July 1997 to 12 August 2002)
- Air Vice-Marshal Richard Anthony Charles (12 August 2002 to 9 April 2009)
- Air Vice-Marshal Lindsay Irvine (9 April 2009 to 29 April 2017)
- Air Vice-Marshal Alison Mardell (29 April 2017 to 29 September 2018)
- Air Vice-Marshal Tamara Jennings (29 September 2018 to 27 September 2024)
- Air Vice-Marshal Mark Phelps (27 September 2024 to present)

=== Deputy Directors Legal Services (RAF) ===
- Air Commodore Lindsay Irvine (7 January 2003 to 9 April 2009)
- Air Commodore William Boothby (3 April 2009 to 14 July 2011)
- Air Commodore Stephen Kell (14 July 2011 to 15 July 2014)
- Air Commodore Alison Mardell (15 July 2014 to 29 April 2017)
- Air Commodore Tamara Jennings (29 April 2017 to 29 September 2018)
- Air Commodore Kevin Sanders (8 October 2018 to 7 June 2020)
- Air Commodore Mark Phelps (9 October 2020 to 27 September 2024)
- Air Commodore Kevin Sanders (24 October 2024 to present)
