= British nuclear weapons and the Falklands War =

The British government did not seriously consider using its nuclear weapons against Argentina during the 1982 Falklands War. The United Kingdom had ratified the Treaty of Tlatelolco which established a nuclear-weapon-free zone across Latin America in 1969 and made a commitment in the United Nations during 1978 not to use these weapons against non–nuclear powers. The strong international norms against the use of nuclear weapons also influenced British decision making. The British War Cabinet never contemplated the use of nuclear weapons but the Prime Minister, Margaret Thatcher, may have done so separately when considering how she would respond to a serious defeat.

Four of the British Royal Navy warships which were sent to the South Atlantic following the invasion of the Falklands initially carried a total of thirty nuclear depth bombs as part of their standard armament. The Chief of the Defence Staff, Admiral Sir Terence Lewin, wanted to retain them on the ships in case the Soviet Union became involved in the war but this was opposed by civilian Ministry of Defence staff. The War Cabinet decided on 8 April 1982 to have these weapons removed but reluctantly reversed this decision three days later due to the impracticality of offloading the depth bombs at that time. On 28 May, the War Cabinet decided that the weapons should be returned to the UK and many of them were shipped back before the end of the conflict. The presence of nuclear depth bombs in the naval task force was reported by journalists soon after the end of the war but not confirmed by the British government until 2003.

It was alleged during and after the war that the British ballistic missile submarine HMS Resolution had been sent to the South Atlantic. This has been denied by senior British government figures as well as Resolution's commanding officer. Historians have found no evidence of such a deployment. Nuclear-capable Avro Vulcan bombers were used in the war but were armed only with conventional bombs.

The British nuclear arsenal did not deter Argentina's invasion of the Falklands on 2 April 1982 as the Argentine government believed that the weapons would not be used. The Argentine government was unconcerned about the deployment of nuclear-capable British forces during the war. Experts have debated the implications of the war on whether nuclear deterrence prevents conflicts.

== Background ==
=== Falklands War ===
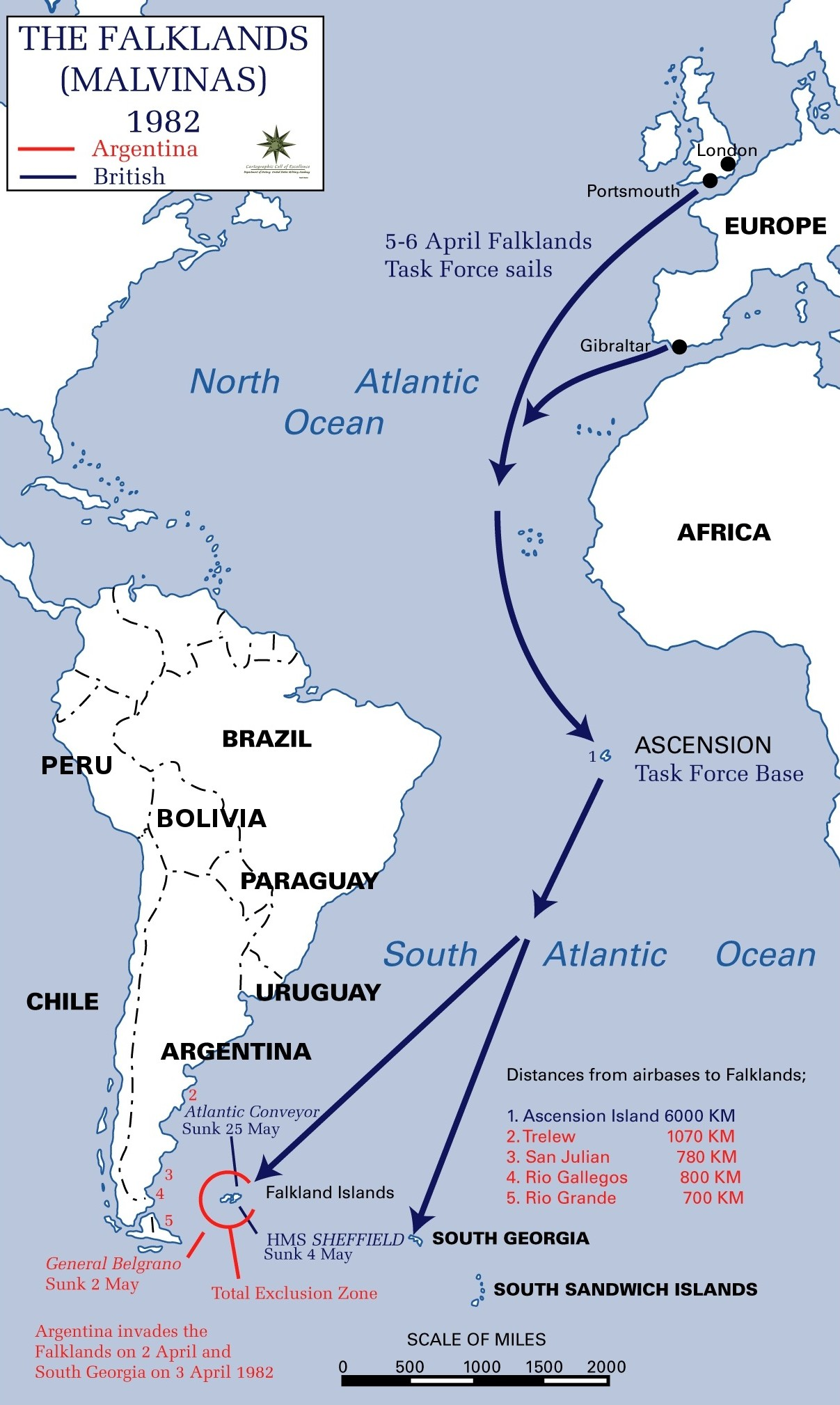
A map showing key locations during the Falklands War and the distances covered by British forces

The Falkland Islands is an archipelago in the South Atlantic Ocean and a British Overseas Territory. The islands are located 8,000 miles (13,000 km) from the UK. Sovereignty over the Falklands has been disputed between Argentina and the UK since 1833. A crisis over the islands developed in early 1982. On 2 April that year, Argentine forces invaded and captured the Falklands. At this time they were defended only by a group of 70 Royal Marines and Royal Navy personnel. The British government decided to retake the Falklands and very rapidly assembled and dispatched a task force of Royal Navy warships to begin this process. The military campaign was very risky for the British as the forces which could be deployed to the South Atlantic were not significantly superior to the Argentine defenders and it was difficult to sustain them at such a distance from the UK.

After initial diplomatic negotiations failed, fighting began on 1 May. Further negotiations proved fruitless, and British forces landed on the islands on 21 May. Following a series of fierce battles the Argentine forces there were defeated and surrendered on 14 June 1982. Several Royal Navy warships were sunk by Argentine air attacks during the war.

=== British nuclear weapons ===
The United Kingdom first tested a nuclear weapon in 1952 and began producing operational nuclear bombs from 1953. This made the UK the third country after the United States and Soviet Union to deploy these weapons. During the Cold War the British military was equipped with hundreds of nuclear devices. The size of the British nuclear arsenal peaked between 1974 and 1981 when it comprised approximately 500 nuclear warheads.

The British Armed Forces operated several types of nuclear weapons in 1982. A total of 100 warheads fitted to standard Polaris missiles and 35 fitted to missiles that had been upgraded through the Chevaline programme were carried by the Royal Navy's four ballistic missile submarines. The submarines comprised the British strategic nuclear force and were focused on deterring the Soviet Union. The Royal Navy was also assigned 43 WE.177A nuclear depth bombs; these were tactical nuclear weapons intended to be used against submarines. The Royal Air Force had 250 WE.177 bombs. In addition, the British Armed Forces had access to more than 150 nuclear warheads provided by the United States. Most of the American-owned warheads were assigned to the British Army of the Rhine that was stationed in Germany.

During the early 1980s many Royal Navy warships routinely carried WE.177A nuclear depth bombs. This practice had begun during the 1960s. The weapons had an explosive yield of 0.5 kilotons of TNT (2.1 TJ) and could be dropped from anti-submarine helicopters or Sea Harrier jet fighters. The Royal Navy considered the existence of the WE.177A nuclear depth bombs to be a sensitive issue and they were first officially disclosed as part of the 1981 Defence White Paper. The Navy had a policy of never confirming or denying whether specific ships were carrying nuclear weapons. The British Ministry of Defence had also never publicly commented on the whereabouts of nuclear weapons.

== Nuclear weapons policies ==
=== Pre-war ===
In 1967 the British government signed the Treaty of Tlatelolco which established a nuclear-weapon-free zone across Latin America and the nearby waters, including the Falkland Islands. The government ratified the treaty in 1969. Argentina also signed the Treaty of Tlatelolco in 1967 but had still not ratified it at the time of the Falklands War. Under the terms of the treaty, the UK was not able to use nuclear weapons against countries who had ratified the treaty. It also could not station these weapons in the Falkland Islands and its other dependencies in the South Atlantic or their territorial waters. Deploying nuclear weapons to other locations in the South Atlantic Ocean was not prohibited. Nuclear-powered ships, such as the Royal Navy's nuclear submarines, were outside the scope of the Treaty of Tlatelolco.

Prior to the Falklands War the British government had also provided a commitment not to use its nuclear weapons against countries that did not possess these weapons. In June 1978 the British government issued a "Negative Security Assurance" as part of a process overseen by the United Nations' Special Session on Disarmament. In this assurance the government stated that it would not use nuclear weapons against non–nuclear states unless any of these states attacked the "UK, its dependent territories, its armed forces or its allies" in "association or alliance with a nuclear weapons state". Argentina was a non–nuclear state at the time of the Falklands War. As the country had not ratified the Treaty on the Non-Proliferation of Nuclear Weapons or the Treaty of Tlatelolco the British were not legally obliged to treat it as such. (Note: Argentina did not ratify the Treaty of Tlatelolco until 1994. It acceded to the Treaty on the Non-Proliferation of Nuclear Weapons in 1995.)

The Argentine government knew that it was not protected from British nuclear attack under the terms of the Treaty of Tlatelolco. However, it believed that these weapons would not be used in response to an invasion of the Falklands. This was because there was a strong international norm against the use of nuclear weapons as a result of their devastating effects – often labelled the "nuclear taboo". The national security experts John Arquilla and María Moyano Rasmussen have observed that due to the "normative inhibitions against the threat" of using nuclear weapons "there is no evidence of the [Argentine] junta being intimidated" by the British nuclear arsenal. The Argentine government decided to invade as it believed that the British government was not strongly committed to retaining the Falklands and could not deploy sufficient conventional forces to recapture the islands at such a distance from the UK.

=== During the war ===
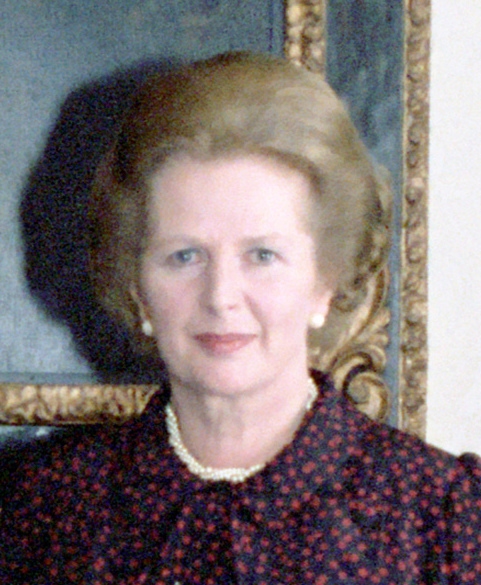
British Prime Minister Margaret Thatcher in 1982

From the outset of the conflict the British government had no intention of using nuclear weapons. On 27 April Viscount Trenchard, the Minister for Defence Procurement, stated in the House of Lords that "categorically ... there is no question at all of our using nuclear weapons in this dispute". This statement was made to ensure that the British government's position on the matter was clear. An opinion poll conducted in the UK on 14 April 1982 found that 93 per cent of respondents opposed using nuclear weapons against Argentina and 5 per cent supported doing so. A key issue underpinning the government's and public's views was a perception that the use of these extremely powerful weapons would have been grossly disproportionate to the threat Argentina posed to the UK.

The British official historian of the Falklands War, Sir Lawrence Freedman, investigated post-war "suggestions ... that the nuclear option had been seriously considered" as part of preparing the official history during the early 2000s. He found that the possibility of using nuclear weapons may have been included in a very early draft of the options paper prepared for the British government following the Argentine invasion, but this had been removed well before the paper was completed and submitted to ministers. Freedman concluded that "I have found no references to any consideration of nuclear employment. This was never taken seriously as a realistic possibility". This finding is in line with comments made by the Chief of the Defence Staff during the Falklands War, Admiral Sir Terence Lewin, who had told Freedman in 1989 that "there was never any thought whatever of giving advice to the War Cabinet that nuclear weapons should be used. It never entered our remotest thoughts".

During the mid-2010s historians Peter Hennessy and James Jinks also looked into the claims that the British government had been willing to use nuclear weapons against Argentina. While endorsing Freedman's conclusion that the War Cabinet did not consider the use of nuclear weapons, they stated that the Prime Minister, Margaret Thatcher, had probably done so separately. Hennessy and Jinks' source was the former Permanent Secretary of the Ministry of Defence, Sir Michael Quinlan, who had stated in a 2013 BBC interview that Thatcher told him after the war that she would have considered using nuclear weapons had the British forces faced defeat. (Note: Under British command and control procedures at the time of the Falklands War, the Prime Minister, or, if they could not be contacted or had been killed during a Soviet nuclear attack, a surviving senior minister who had been designated a "nuclear deputy" was the only person who could authorise the use of nuclear weapons.)

The political scientists Todd S. Sechser and Matthew Fuhrmann considered this issue in 2017. They believe that the British government deliberately deployed nuclear-capable forces to suggest to the Argentines that these weapons could be used, though no preparations to do so occurred. They labelled Quinlan's comments about Thatcher "a stunning revelation".

== Nuclear depth bombs ==
=== Deployment ===
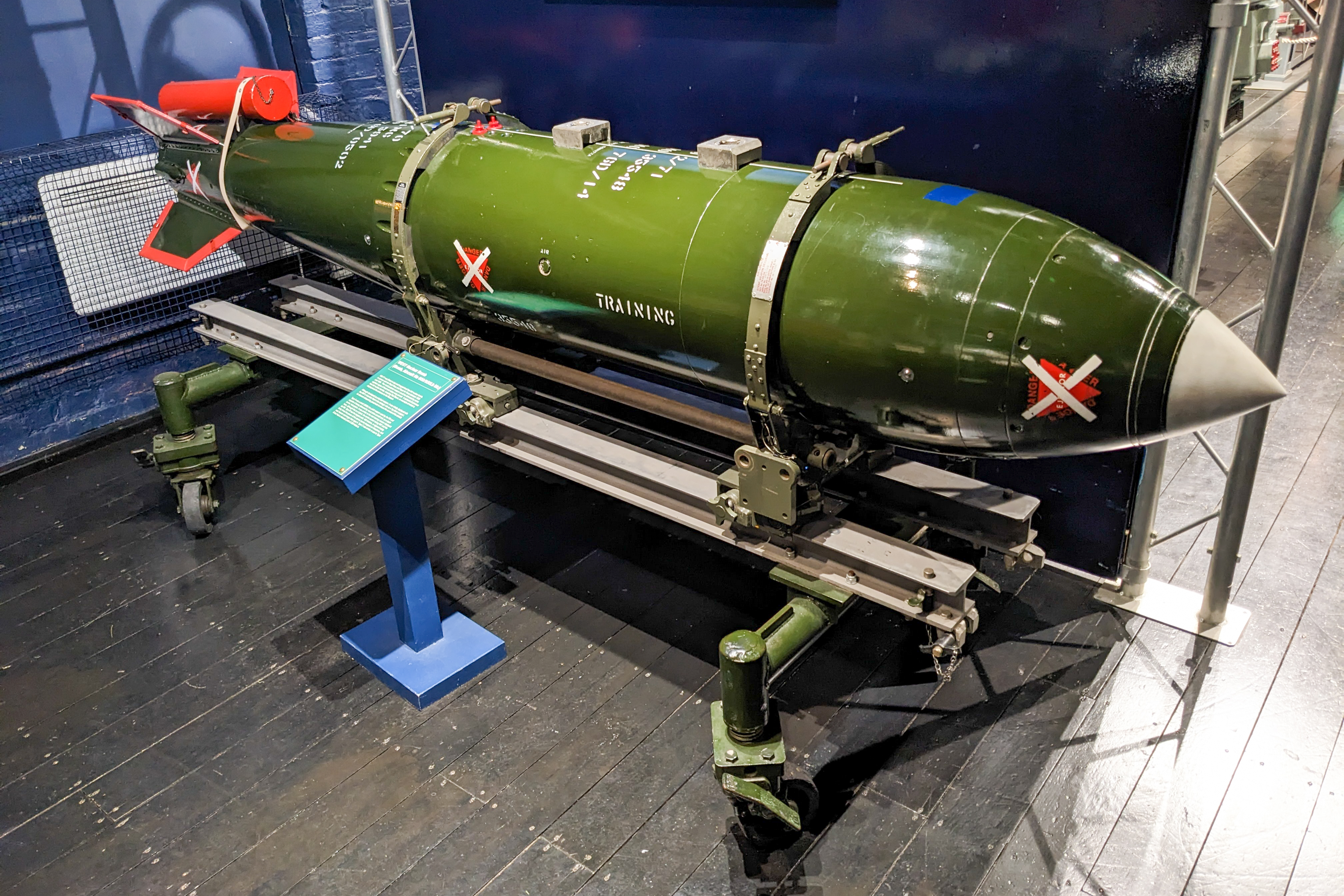
A WE.177 training round on display at the Explosion Museum of Naval Firepower

The Royal Navy hurriedly assembled a force of warships in response to the Argentine invasion of the Falklands. It comprised ships stationed in the UK and some that were on exercises or operational deployments elsewhere. It prioritised preparation of the task force as quickly as possible so that it could limit the build-up of Argentine forces on the islands, leading to urgent efforts at the Royal Navy's bases in the UK and Gibraltar to stock the ships with supplies and dispatch them.

Several warships assigned to the task force were carrying nuclear depth bombs. The aircraft carriers HMS Hermes and Invincible had 16 and 10 WE.177A nuclear depth bombs respectively, representing the majority of the Royal Navy's holdings of these weapons. The frigates HMS Brilliant and Broadsword each carried two WE.177As. Three warships and three Royal Fleet Auxiliary (RFA) support ships carried "surveillance round" or "training round" variants of the WE.177A. The surveillance rounds were inert WE.177As that were fitted with sensors to monitor conditions in weapons magazines. They did not include any nuclear material but were otherwise almost identical to live WE.177As. The training rounds were empty WE.177A casings which were used to practice handling nuclear depth bombs.

It was not feasible to remove the nuclear depth bombs before the warships sailed from Gibraltar and the UK between 1 and 7 April. (Note: The initial force that was dispatched included seven warships that had undertaken preparations at Gibraltar; these sailed on 1 and 2 April. The two aircraft carriers and several other warships and RFA vessels sailed from the UK between 5 and 7 April. Many other warships and support ships were dispatched later. The frigates HMS Broadsword and Argonaut offloaded WE.177A training rounds at Gibraltar and Devonport in the UK before deploying to the South Atlantic.) The main issue which prevented this was the need for the task force be rapidly dispatched. While some of the nuclear depth bombs could have been offloaded from warships at Portsmouth, this could not be done covertly and the unloading process would disrupt work to prepare other ships to deploy given that all major activities needed to cease in a 270-metre (890 ft) radius while the weapons were being moved.

Lewin favoured retaining the nuclear depth bombs on board the ships. He did not believe that they would be necessary and had no plans for them to be used, but thought it was desirable to have the weapons at hand in case the Soviet Union intervened in the war and its submarines attacked the British force. Civilian staff in the Ministry of Defence disagreed with Lewin and advocated for urgent actions to remove nuclear weapons before the warships sailed. This in turn led to concerns among some admirals over civilians overriding military assessments.

=== War Cabinet decisions ===
The British War Cabinet debated what to do about the nuclear depth bombs. Thatcher and the ministers who made up the War Cabinet had not previously been aware that British warships routinely carried nuclear weapons. They disagreed with Lewin's views on the desirability of sending nuclear depth bombs to the South Atlantic and preferred that this not occur. The matter was considered at the War Cabinet's first meeting on 7 April. At this time its members wanted to remove the weapons before the warships entered combat as long as this could be done covertly so as to not disclose the whereabouts of British nuclear weapons. If the issue was raised in Parliament, the government would have confirmed that nuclear weapons would not be used unless circumstances significantly changed but not comment on whether the warships were carrying them. On 8 April the War Cabinet endorsed a proposal made by the Foreign Secretary, Francis Pym, that the nuclear weapons be removed.

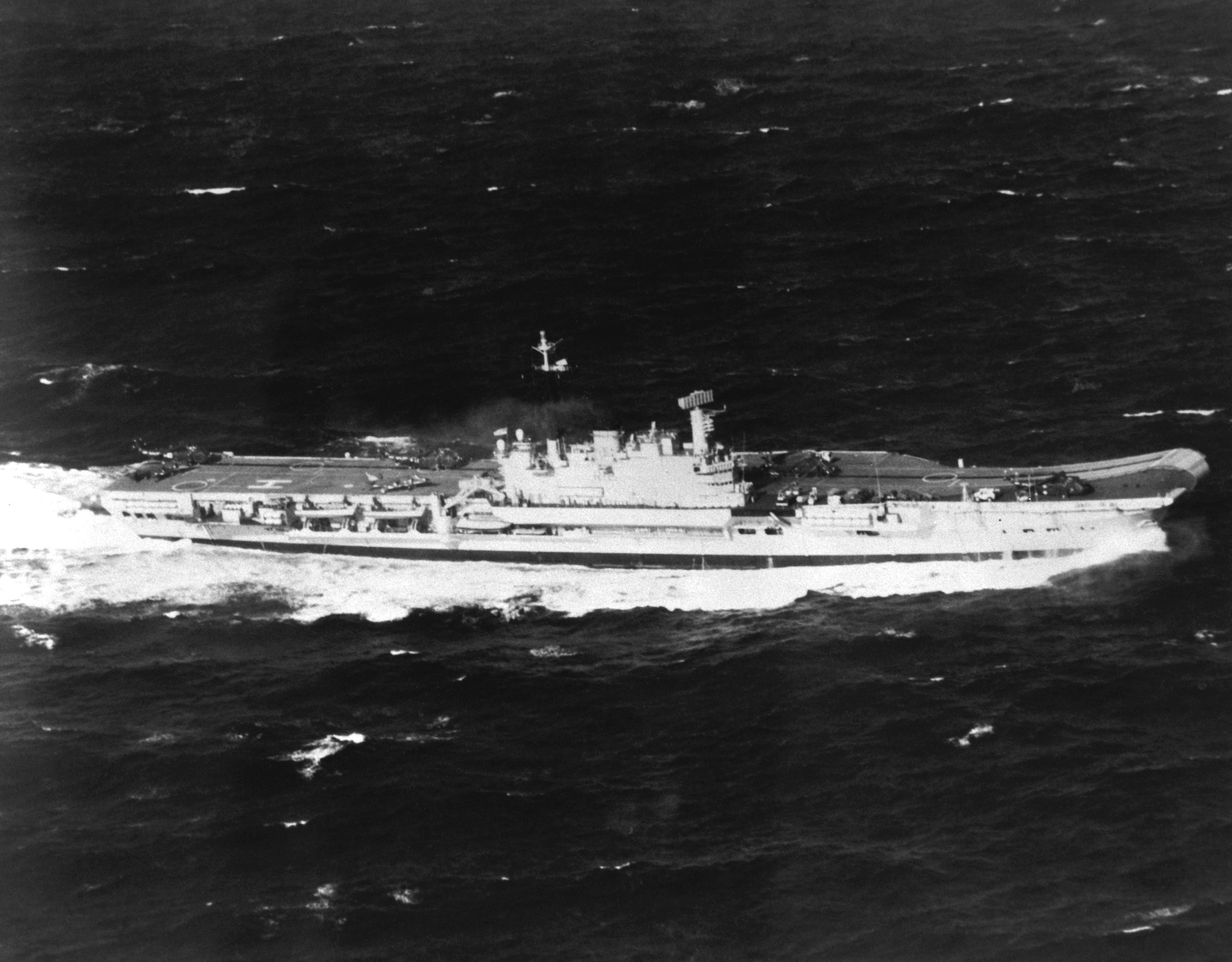
HMS Hermes in 1982. This aircraft carrier carried 18 nuclear depth bombs for much of the Falklands War.

Following the War Cabinet's decision on 8 April, consideration was given to options to unload the weapons from the warships at sea. One option involved transferring the active and inert depth bombs stored on board frigates to the aircraft carriers or RFA ships where they would be less vulnerable. Due to a shortage of ships, no RFA vessel was available to return the weapons to the UK at this time. Consideration was also given to offloading the depth bombs at Ascension Island in the South Atlantic when the task force arrived there. This was ruled out largely on the grounds of urgency, as the operation would delay the task force's departure from Ascension by up to 36 hours. The island was also ill-suited as it lacked suitable facilities for storing nuclear weapons or covertly unloading them from warships.

Due to the difficulty of offloading the nuclear depth bombs, the War Cabinet agreed on 11 April that they should be retained on board the task force's ships. This decision was made reluctantly. It was decided that all of the weapons would be stored on board the two aircraft carriers as they had the best protected weapons magazines. Thatcher stressed that the ships carrying nuclear weapons must not come within 3 miles (4.8 km) of the Falkland Islands as this could breach the terms of the Treaty of Tlatelolco. The nuclear depth bombs on board Brilliant were transferred to RFA Fort Austin on 16 April. The ship also received a surveillance round from the destroyer HMS Sheffield that day. The nuclear depth bombs on board Broadsword were offloaded four days later to RFA Resource. Both RFA vessels were large fleet replenishment ships that carried ammunition, food and other items. They were fitted to securely transport nuclear weapons.

The depth bombs were subsequently transferred to the aircraft carriers. Fort Austin's weapons were moved to Hermes on 9 May and some of Resource's to Invincible on 14 May. A training round was transferred from Invincible to Resource that day. The remainder of the nuclear depth bombs on board Resource and a training round were transferred to RFA Regent on 15 May before the former ship detached from the task force's aircraft carrier battle group to operate near the Falklands. On 17 May Regent received a surveillance round and a training round from Fort Austin and a surveillance round from the destroyer HMS Coventry. Regent returned the depth bombs and two surveillance rounds to Resource on 26 May before it began operating close to the Falklands.

=== Removal ===
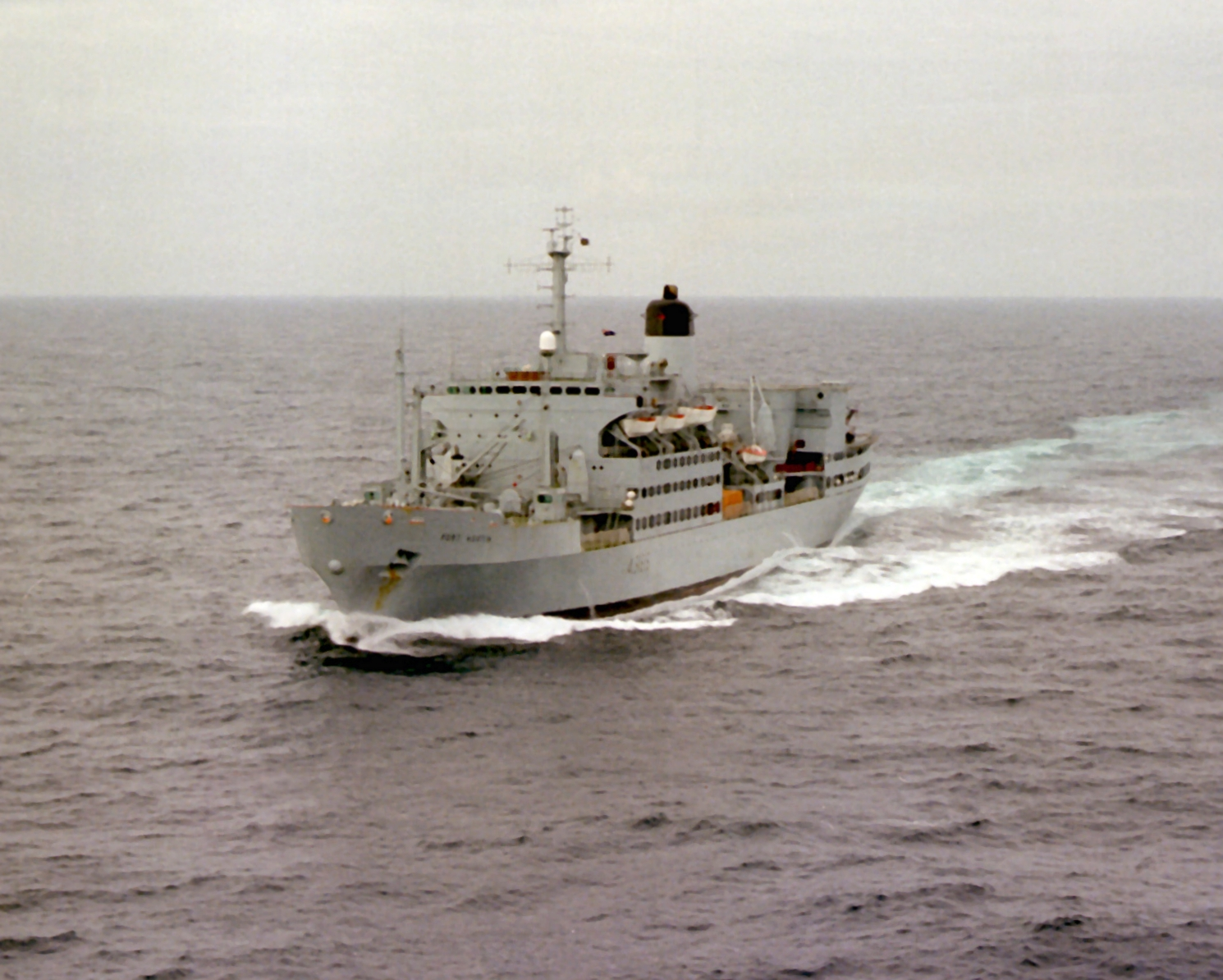
RFA Fort Austin in 1982

The sinking of several British warships by Argentine aircraft in late May led to concerns over the consequences of a ship carrying nuclear weapons being attacked. The War Cabinet decided on 28 May that the nuclear depth bombs as well as the surveillance and training rounds should be returned to the UK. Due to operational demands this could not be achieved immediately. An assessment was made of the risks associated with keeping the weapons on board ships that might be attacked. It was concluded that there was no risk of the nuclear depth bombs exploding if the aircraft carriers were struck by Argentine Exocet anti-ship missiles, though it was possible that the ships would become contaminated with nuclear material.

The weapons on board Invincible were transferred to Fort Austin on 2 and 3 June. Fort Austin also received all of Resource's depth bombs and surveillance and training rounds as well as training rounds from Brilliant, the destroyer HMS Glamorgan and RFA Fort Grange on 3 June. The aircraft carrier battle group was operating to the east of the Falklands at this time. Fort Austin arrived in the UK on 29 June. Hermes' nuclear depth bombs and two training rounds were offloaded to Resource on 26 June. This was after the end of the war, and at this time Hermes was the only carrier operating near the Falklands as Invincible was undergoing a period of maintenance at sea 3,000 miles (4,800 km) to the north east of the islands. Resource reached the UK on 20 July. Both RFA vessels unloaded their cargos of nuclear depth bombs and surveillance and training rounds at HMNB Devonport on the day of their arrival in the UK. The weapons were then sent to storage facilities.

Seven of the containers holding active and inert nuclear weapons were damaged during transfers between the various ships. None of the weapons was affected and they were all found to be safe and serviceable after they arrived back in the UK.

== Alleged ballistic missile submarine deployment ==
=== Allegations ===
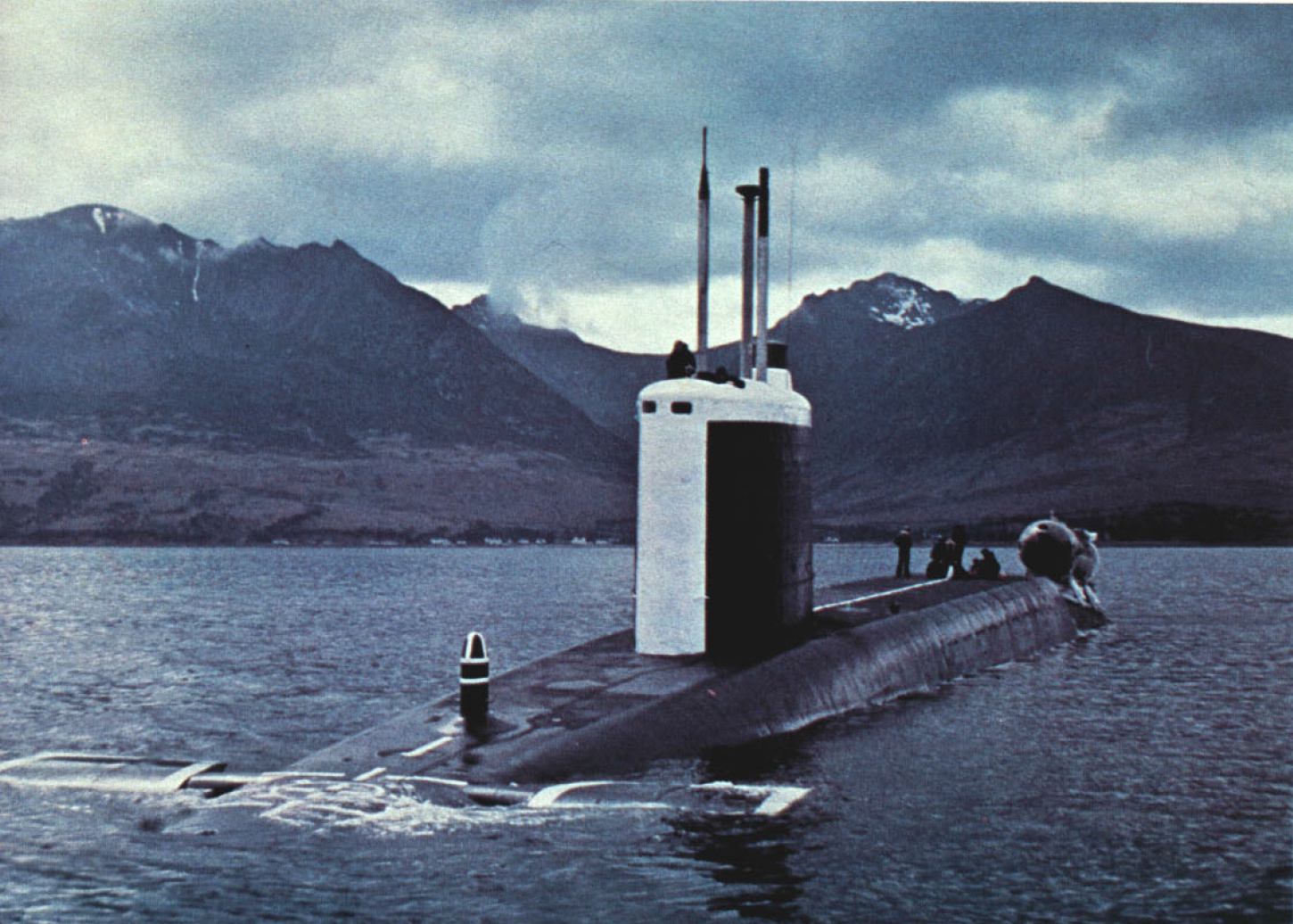
A Resolution-class submarine during a training exercise in 1979

Shortly after the Argentine invasion of the Falklands, the BBC World Service incorrectly reported that the nuclear-armed ballistic missile submarine HMS Resolution was operating off Argentina. Resolution was conducting a standard 72-day patrol in the North Atlantic at this time and her commanding officer and navigator were amused when they learned about the story. Family members of Resolution's crew who contacted the Navy about the report were told it was false. In August 1984 New Statesman magazine published an article claiming that the British government had considered using one of the Royal Navy's ballistic missile submarines to attack the mainland of Argentina. This article alleged that a Resolution-class submarine had been sent to operate near Ascension Island following the sinking of Sheffield in early May (Note: HMS Sheffield was wrecked by an Exocet missile fired from an Argentine aircraft on 4 May and sank on 10 May. The attack greatly concerned the British as the Royal Navy had little ability to protect its ships against Exocets and Argentina was believed to have three of the air-launched variant of these missiles remaining. Sheffield was also the first Royal Navy warship to have been destroyed in combat since World War II and its loss shocked ministers in the British government.) to bring its missiles within range of Argentina.

Supposedly, the British government intended to threaten Argentina with nuclear missiles or even make a demonstrative nuclear attack on Córdoba Province if a troop ship or aircraft carrier were sunk. The article stated that its source was the Labour member of parliament Tam Dalyell who claimed to have learned this from an unnamed Conservative member of parliament. The Conservative MP was probably Alan Clark, a backbencher. The British government strongly denied these allegations. The First Sea Lord during the Falklands War, Admiral Sir Henry Leach, stated that "we did not contemplate a nuclear attack and did not make any preparatory moves for such action" and that the ballistic missile submarines remained in their usual patrol areas. The claims were raised again in 1989 by the British academic Paul Rogers. In 2005 a psychoanalyst who had regularly met with French President François Mitterrand during the Falklands War claimed that he had told her that Thatcher had threatened to use nuclear missiles against Argentina unless France provided codes to disable Argentina's Exocet missiles.

=== Historians' assessments ===
Freedman investigated these claims in the early 2000s and judged that they were not justified. He did not find any archival evidence that indicated that a Resolution-class submarine had been sent to the South Atlantic. Freedman suggested that the Conservative MP who told Dalyell about the supposed deployment may have done so as "a mischievous test ... of the latter's gullibility".

The claims that a ballistic missile submarine had been deployed were also explored by Hennessy and Jinks as part of a 2015 history of the Royal Navy's submarine force. They interviewed Resolution's commanding officer at the time of the Falklands War as well as Admiral Sir Peter Herbert who had been the Flag Officer Submarines. Both were adamant that there had been no consideration of sending a ballistic missile submarine to the South Atlantic and that Resolution had completed a standard patrol in the North Atlantic. Hennessy and Jinks also dismissed the claims made by Mitterrand's psychoanalyst, noting that it is not clear what "codes" for Exocet missiles she was referring to.

== Vulcan bombers ==
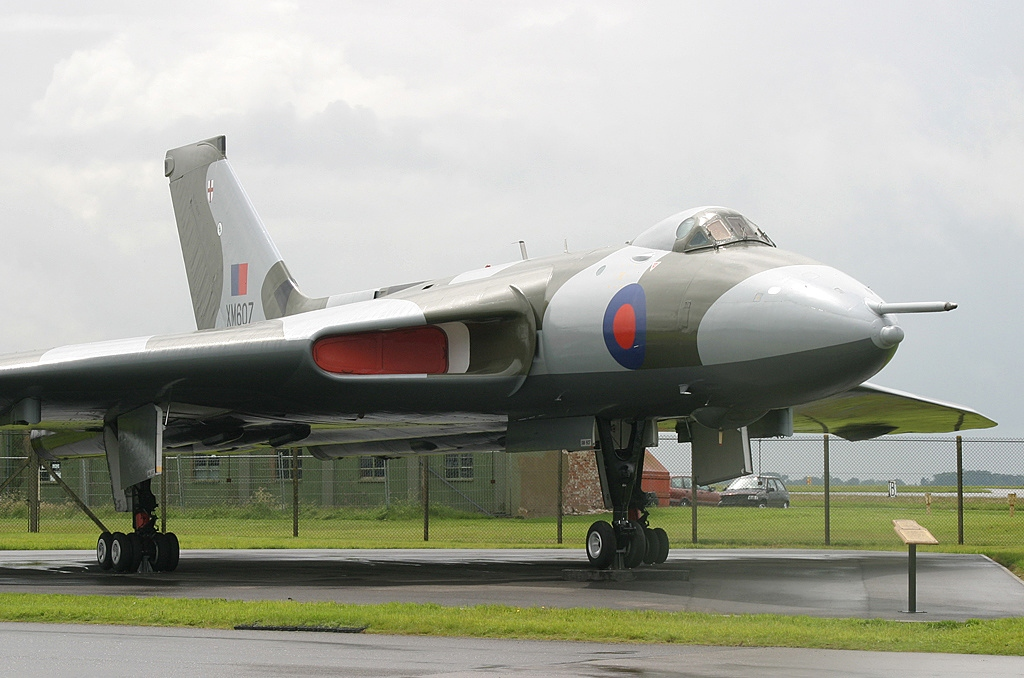
One of the Vulcan bombers that took part in the Falklands War

Several of the Royal Air Force's Avro Vulcan bombers were used in the Falklands War. While these aircraft formed a key part of the UK's nuclear deterrent force, they operated during the war solely as conventional bombers. Flying from Ascension Island, Vulcans made seven attacks against Argentine forces in the Falklands during Operation Black Buck.

The British government did not contemplate using Vulcans to deliver nuclear weapons during the Falklands War. However, it was aware that the aircraft were primarily considered nuclear bombers and this was noted as part of a Cabinet discussion on 14 April. The Cabinet also noted the desirability of the Argentine government being concerned that Vulcans would be used to attack the country's mainland, though the British had no intention of doing so. In 2017 Sechser and Fuhrmann suggested that "Britain may have exploited the aircraft's perceived atomic connection to intimidate Argentina".

== Aftermath ==
=== Argentine responses ===
The deployment of nuclear weapons–capable British forces to the South Atlantic did not cause the Argentine government to believe that the UK would use these weapons during the war. Argentine officials dismissed the wartime speculation over this issue. The Argentine government also considered it highly unlikely that the British would employ nuclear weapons if their forces were defeated in the Falklands. This was because of the "nuclear taboo" as well as an expectation that the Soviet and United States governments would have restrained the British had they threatened to use nuclear weapons. The Argentine government repeatedly claimed during the war that the UK had violated the Treaty of Tlatelolco by deploying nuclear submarines and ships carrying nuclear weapons to the South Atlantic.

The Soviet embassy in Argentina encouraged speculation following the sinking of Sheffield that the ship had been carrying nuclear weapons. It was also alleged that the British had raised nuclear depth charges from the wrecks of Sheffield and Coventry, with the Soviets helping to spread these claims. While both destroyers had deployed carrying surveillance rounds, they had been removed prior to their loss. British divers had operated on the wreck of Coventry, but this was to recover classified equipment. The depth of the ocean where Sheffield sank was beyond the reach of diving equipment.

A collection of letters from a Royal Navy officer who had been killed in the war was published in November 1982. In these letters he observed sighting what he took to be a dummy nuclear depth bomb on RFA Fort Austin. This revelation led at least one journalist to later confirm that nuclear depth bombs had been sent to the South Atlantic. The British government did not confirm or deny these reports, in line with its broader policy of not commenting on the deployment of nuclear weapons.

In response to Argentina's claims that the UK had violated the Treaty of Tlatelolco, the British government stated that it had not deployed nuclear weapons "within the Treaty's zone of application". The issue was debated at the May 1983 meeting of OPANAL, the regional nonproliferation agency that had been established under the Treaty. The countries who were parties to the Treaty adopted a range of positions on Argentina's claims. The resolution that was adopted at the end of the meeting stated that the participating countries "note with concern" Argentina's allegations and "take note" of the statement provided by the UK denying them. During the 1980s the governments of Argentina and Brazil also repeatedly claimed that the UK had stationed nuclear weapons in the Falkland Islands following the war. The British government rejected these allegations and stated it had no intentions of deploying nuclear weapons to the military facilities that had been constructed in the islands. The British provided an assurance that they would continue to abide by the Treaty of Tlatelolco.

The British Ministry of Defence first confirmed the presence of nuclear weapons on board British warships during the Falklands War in December 2003. This admission was made in response to repeated requests made by a journalist working at The Guardian. The President of Argentina, Nestor Kirchner, requested that the British government "ask our forgiveness" for sending nuclear weapons into the South Atlantic. He also said that the revelations had not harmed the relationship between Argentina and the UK. Specific details of the deployment of nuclear weapons during the Falklands War were revealed as part of the British official history that was published in 2005.

=== British nuclear weapons policies ===
Following the Falklands War British ministers considered whether Royal Navy warships should continue to routinely carry nuclear depth bombs. It was reported in 1985 that the government was reluctant to authorise this due to its concerns over the practice. Eric Grove, a naval historian and defence analyst, wrote in 1987 that it had been decided to "keep the stockpile [of nuclear depth bombs] ashore during peacetime". In contrast, defence commentator and historian Norman Polmar stated in 2007 that Royal Navy ships continued to carry nuclear depth bombs until the weapons were retired in 1993.

The Royal Navy maintained its policy of not confirming or denying whether individual ships were carrying nuclear weapons following the war. The Australian government, which had a policy of not allowing nuclear weapons on Australian territory, refused permission for Invincible to be repaired in a graving dock at Sydney during December 1983 when the British declined to comment on whether it had nuclear weapons embarked.

== Commentary on nuclear deterrence ==
Experts have discussed why the British nuclear arsenal did not deter Argentina from invading the Falkland Islands. The Indo-Canadian political scientist T. V. Paul commented on this issue in the conclusions of a 1995 article focused on the implications of non-use of nuclear weapons in the Falklands and Yom Kippur Wars. He observed that "mere possession of nuclear weapons need not deter a non–nuclear state from launching a conventional attack against the nuclear-armed state if the initiator believes that it can wage a limited war without provoking a nuclear response" and that nuclear deterrence may only be effective in "circumstances in which the nuclear-weapon state's existence is at stake". Jeremy Stocker, a fellow at the Royal United Services Institute, similarly wrote in 2007 that such weapons "will not deter lesser adventurism where the use of nuclear weapons would be disproportionate and so not credible as a deterrent – for example, the 1982 Falklands War". In 2017 Sechser and Fuhrmann gave the Falklands conflict as an example of a nuclear-armed country failing to coerce a non-–nuclear nation.

The conflict has also been cited as part of broader debate over whether nuclear weapons have the capacity to deter wars. The American philosopher Douglas P. Lackey wrote in 1984 that "British nuclear threats did not prevent seizure of the Falkland Islands" as part of a section of a book in which he asserted that nuclear weapons made no difference to the outcomes of international crises and wars. In 1989 Evan Luard, a British international relations writer and former Labour member of parliament and Social Democratic Party politician, reached a similar conclusion. He stated that while international relations theories hold that the ability of nuclear weapons to deter conflict is greatest when one country has them and the other does not, the Falklands War was one of several examples that demonstrated that this was not actually the case. In 2008 the American researcher and anti-nuclear campaigner Ward Wilson argued that the Falklands War was one of a number of conflicts that demonstrated that nuclear weapons do not deter wars. Derrin Culp, who is also an American researcher, authored an article in 2012 critiquing Wilson's views. As part of this, he judged that nuclear deterrence did not fail during the Falklands War as the British government had never indicated it would use these weapons if the islands were invaded.
