= HMS Invincible (R05) =

1980 Invincible-class light aircraft carrier

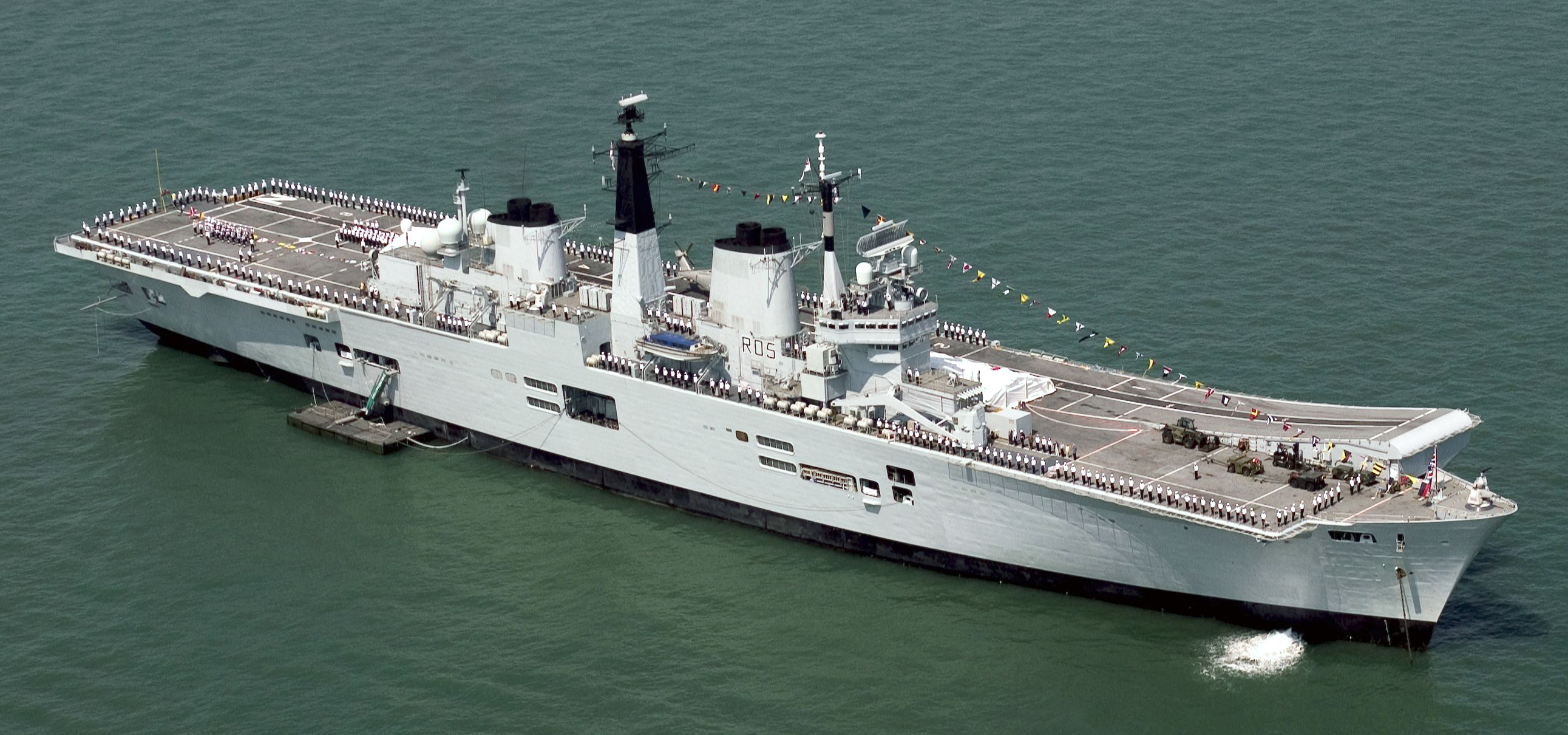
- HMS Invincible in 2005

History

United Kingdom
- Name: Invincible
- Ordered: 17 April 1973
- Builder: Vickers Shipbuilding Limited, Barrow-in-Furness, England
- Laid down: July 1973
- Launched: 3 May 1977
- Sponsored by: Queen Elizabeth II
- Commissioned: 11 July 1980
- Decommissioned: 3 August 2005
- Stricken: 10 September 2010
- Home port: HMNB Portsmouth
- Identification: IMO number: 8949551; Pennant: R05; Deck code: N
- Nickname(s): "Vince"
- Fate: Scrapped 2011
- Badge

General characteristics
- Class & type: Invincible-class aircraft carrier
- Displacement: 16,000 t (16,000 long tons) (light); 22,000 t (22,000 long tons) fully loaded
- Length: 689 ft (210 m)
- Beam: 118.1 ft (36.0 m)
- Draught: 28.9 ft (8.8 m)
- Propulsion: 4 × Rolls-Royce Olympus TM3B gas turbines providing 97,000 hp (72,000 kW); 8 Paxman Valenta diesel generators
- Speed: 28 knots (52 km/h; 32 mph) max
- Range: 7,000 nmi (13,000 km; 8,100 mi) at 18 knots (33 km/h; 21 mph)
- Complement: 1,051 total, including 726 ship's company and 384 Air Group personnel
- Armament: 3 × Goalkeeper CIWS; 2 × GAM-B01 20 mm close-range guns
- Aircraft carried: Until December 2010, 22 aircraft; Multi Mission - Strike, ASuW and ASW; 12 x Harrier GR.7/9; 10 x Sea King ASaC and Merlin HM Mk.1 helicopters; Multi Mission - Strike and ASuW; 18 x Harrier GR.7/9; 4 x Sea King ASaC and Merlin HM Mk.1 helicopters

HMS Invincible was the Royal Navy's lead ship of her class of three light aircraft carriers. She was launched on 3 May 1977 as the seventh ship to carry the name. She was originally designated as an anti-submarine warfare carrier, but was used as an aircraft carrier during the Falklands War, when she was deployed with HMS Hermes. She took over as flagship of the British fleet when Hermes was sold to India. Invincible was also deployed in the Yugoslav Wars and the Iraq War. During the Falklands Conflict, Argentinian media reported Invincible as sunk on several occasions. In 2005, she was decommissioned and was eventually sold for scrap in February 2011.

== Design ==
As built, Invincible was 677 feet (206 m) long overall and 632 feet (193 m) between perpendiculars, with a beam of 90 ft (27 m) at the waterline and 115 ft (35 m) at flight deck level, and a draught of 24 ft (7.3 m) at full load. Displacement was 16,000 long tons (16,000 t) standard and 19,500 long tons (19,800 t) full load. The ship was powered by four Rolls-Royce Olympus TBM3 gas turbines, with a maximum total continuous power of 94,000 shaft horsepower (70,000 kW). These drove two propeller shafts via reversible gearboxes, giving a maximum speed of 28 knots (32 mph; 52 km/h). The ship had a range of 5,000 nmi (5,800 mi; 9,300 km) at 18 kn (21 mph; 33 km/h).

Invincible's flight deck was 550 ft (168 m) long and 55 ft (16.8 m) wide. It was connected to the ship's hangar by two lifts, with dimensions of 54 ft 8 in (16.66 m) × 31 ft 8 in (9.65 m) and rated to carry aircraft with a weight of 35,000 pounds (16,000 kg). The hangar itself was 500 ft (150 m) long, with width varying between 74 and 40 ft (23 and 12 m) and a height of 20 ft (6.1 m). An upward-curved ski-jump ramp at an angle of 6.5 degrees was fitted at the forward end of the ship's flight deck. This allowed the carrier's Sea Harriers to take off with a higher disposal payload, while shortening the take-off run, leaving more space for helicopter operations. The ship had a design air wing of ten Westland Sea King anti-submarine helicopters and eight British Aerospace Sea Harrier STOVL jet fighters.

As built, defensive armament consisted of a twin Sea Dart surface to air missile launcher in the ship's bows. 22 Sea Dart missiles were carried. A Type 1022 long-range air-search radar was mounted above the ship's bridge, with Type 909 fire control directors for the Sea Dart system mounted at the fore and aft end of the ship's superstructure. A Type 992 air-surface search radar was mounted on the ship's mainmast, while a Type 1006 navigation radar was also fitted. Type 184 medium-range sonar was also fitted. (Note: Invincible was the first ship fitted with Type 1022 radar.)

=== Modifications ===
In September 1982, after returning from the Falklands War, Invincible had her close-in armament supplemented by two Phalanx CIWS and two Oerlikon 20 mm anti-aircraft autocannons.

During 1986–1989, she underwent a major refit, with several changes to increase the ship's aircraft operating efficiency. The angle of the ship's ski-jump was increased to 12 degrees. Her hangar was modified to allow more aircraft (nine Sea Harriers and twelve Sea Kings) to be accommodated below. The ship's overall length increased to 685.8 feet (209.0 m). Additional command facilities were fitted and accommodation for another 120 people (aircrew and command staff) was added. The ship's magazines were enlarged, allowing Sea Eagle anti-ship missiles for the carrier's Sea Harriers to be carried, while also increasing the number of torpedoes carried for the ship's helicopters. Three Thales 30 mm Goalkeeper CIWS replaced the Phalanxes. Type 996 air-sea search radar replaced the Type 992 radar, with Type 2016 sonar replaced the Type 184.

In 2000, Invincible was subject to further modifications to allow her to operate Harrier GR.7s in a ground-attack role. The Sea Dart launcher was removed and the ship's flight deck was enlarged.

== History ==
Invincible was ordered from Vickers Shipbuilding and Engineering on 17 April 1973, and was laid down at Vickers' Barrow-in-Furness on 17 April 1973. The ship's construction was delayed by design changes and industrial action, and Invincible was not launched until 3 May 1977. The ship was launched by Elizabeth II. She was accepted into Royal Navy service on 19 March 1980 and after trials, formally commissioned on 11 July 1980. More trials and work-up followed for the ship and her air wing followed before she was declared operational on 19 June 1981, joining the fleet's other carrier Hermes in service.

Invincible's initial air wing consisted of 801 Naval Air Squadron, equipped with five Sea Harriers and 820 Naval Air Squadron, equipped with Sea King anti-submarine helicopters. In August–September 1981, Invincible took part in the NATO naval exercises "Ocean Venture" and "Ocean Safari".

=== Proposed sale and Falklands War ===
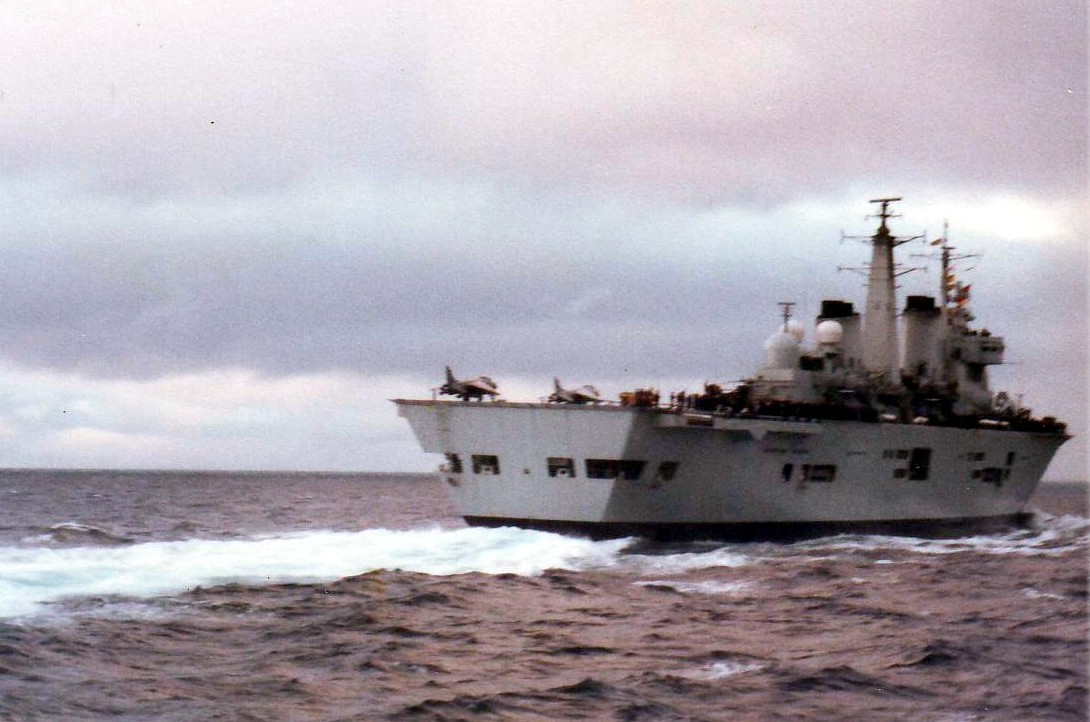
Invincible in the South Atlantic, during the Falklands War

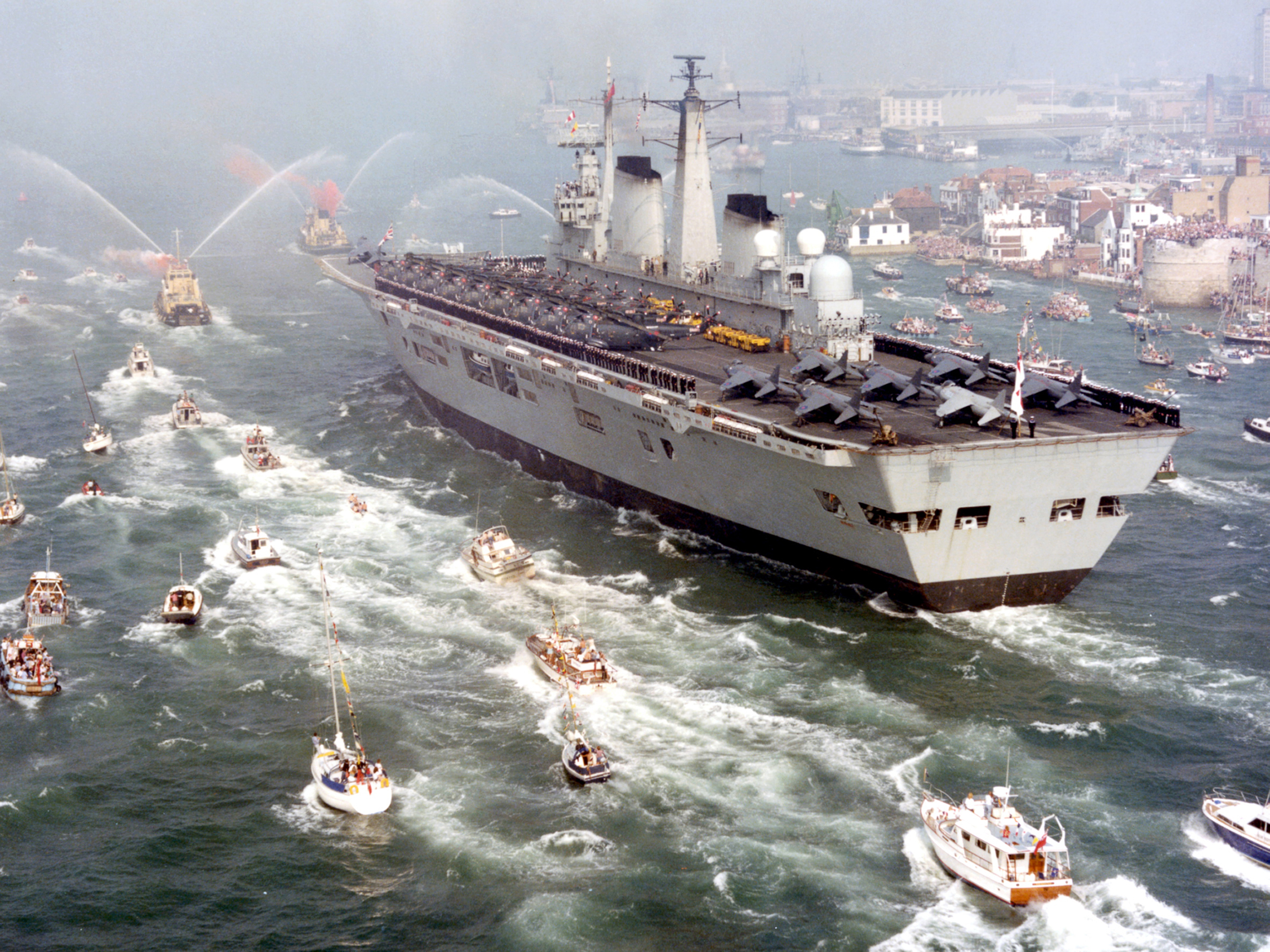
Invincible returns to the Solent after the Falklands War.

Pursuant to the plans announced in the 1981 Defence White Paper, on 25 February 1982, after several months of negotiations, the Australian government announced that it had agreed to buy Invincible for £175 million (285 million A$) (Note: This sum, which was to be payable to two instalments, £90 million in 1982 and the remaining £85 million in 1983, was the direct purchase cost for the ship itself. Spare parts, support costs and a pre-sale refit were expected to push total costs to £295 million.) as a replacement, under the name HMAS Australia, for the Royal Australian Navy's HMAS Melbourne. Australia planned to make minimal changes to the carrier, adding more fuel and replacing some of the ship's computers. Initially at least, it was planned to operate helicopters only. The sale was confirmed by the Ministry of Defence.

On 2 April 1982, however, Argentina invaded the Falkland Islands. Three days later, a naval task force headed by Invincible and Hermes left HMNB Portsmouth bound for the South Atlantic. On 20 April, the UK government formally instructed its defence forces to bring the islands back under British control. Along with eight Sea Harriers, Invincible's air group included twelve Sea King helicopters that were slightly larger than the ship had originally been designed to accommodate. Small machine guns were added around the flight deck and island for close-in defence.

On 23 April, while en route from Ascension Island to the Falklands, Invincible mistakenly locked her Sea Darts on a VARIG Brazilian Airlines DC-10 rather than on the Argentine Air Force Boeing 707 that had been monitoring the fleet's movements. The previous day, Task Group Commander Rear Admiral Sandy Woodward had sought permission from Commander-in-Chief Admiral Sir John Fieldhouse to shoot down the 707 as he believed its activity indicated a raid would be launched from the Argentine aircraft carrier ARA Veinticinco de Mayo. As the 707 would be no direct threat to the fleet, Woodward ordered Weapons Tight and the continued tracking of the aircraft's course while a Sea Harrier was dispatched to investigate. The Harrier pilot reported that "it was a Brazilian airliner, with all the normal navigation and running lights on."

On 30 May, two Dassault-Breguet Super Étendards, one carrying Argentina's last remaining air-launched Exocet, accompanied by four A-4C Skyhawks each with two 500 lb (230 kg) bombs, took off to attack Invincible. Argentine intelligence had sought to determine the position of the carriers from analysis of aircraft flight routes from the task force to the islands. However, the British had a standing order that all aircraft conduct a low level transit when leaving or returning to the carriers to disguise their position. This tactic compromised the Argentine attack, which focused on a group of escorts 40 miles south of the main body of ships. When one of the Super Étendards detected a large target on radar, the Exocet was launched, and the Super Étendards turned for Argentina, while the Skyhawks followed the Exocet, which soon passed out of sight. Two of the attacking Skyhawks were shot down by Sea Darts fired by HMS Exeter, with HMS Avenger claiming to have shot down the missile with her 4.5" gun (although this claim is disputed). No damage was caused to any British vessels. During the war, Argentina claimed to have damaged the ship and continues to do so to this day, although no evidence of any such damage has been produced or uncovered.

The aircraft carrier was carrying 10 nuclear depth bombs as part of her standard armament when she deployed for the Falklands, and was one of several Royal Navy warships so equipped during the war. The weapons were removed while she was in the South Atlantic during early May 1982.

On 1 June, the Australian Prime Minister, Malcolm Fraser, advised the British government that the sale of Invincible to Australia could be cancelled if desired. In July 1983, a year after the end of the Falklands conflict, the Ministry of Defence announced that it had withdrawn its offer to sell Invincible so it could maintain a three-carrier force.

=== 1983–2005 ===
In December 1983, Invincible was refused the use of dry dock facilities in Sydney when the Royal Navy declined to divulge to the Australian authorities whether or not the ship was carrying nuclear weapons. Invincible was accompanied by other ships, including Achilles, during this deployment. She then visited Auckland and Wellington in New Zealand.

Between 1993 and 1995, Invincible was deployed in the Adriatic for Operation "Deny Flight" and then Operation "Deliberate Force" during the Yugoslav Wars. In 1997, flying the flag of Rear-Admiral Alan West, Commander United Kingdom Task Group, Invincible led a deployment that included 3 Commando Brigade Royal Marines. During the following two years, Invincible contributed to Operation "Bolton" (part of Operation "Southern Watch") in southern Iraq before she was redeployed to the Balkans to support the NATO action against Yugoslavia over Kosovo. There, while her helicopters aided refugees, her Harriers were involved in military strikes.

In 2003, Invincible featured in a skit of the BBC show Top Gear involving The Stig racing a white Jaguar XJS on the deck in an attempt to reach 100 mph and stop before the end of the runway. The attempt failed, resulting in The Stig and the Jaguar ending up in the sea.

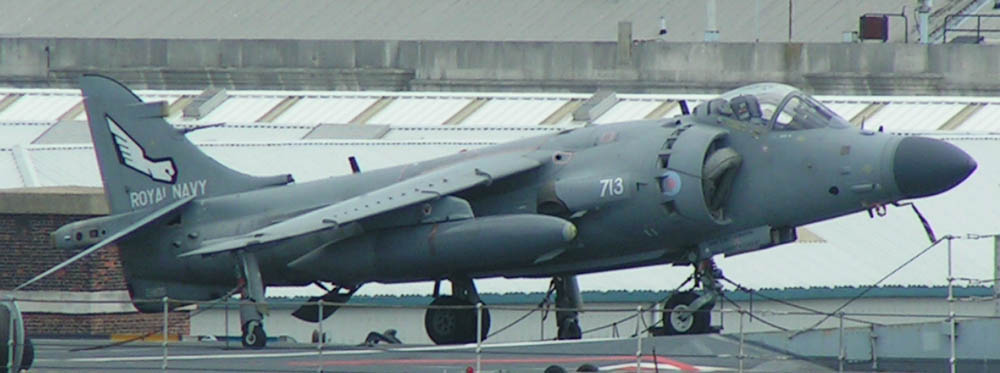
A Sea Harrier FA2 on the deck of Invincible

=== 2005–2011 ===
On 6 June 2005, the British Ministry of Defence announced that Invincible would be inactive until 2010 but available for reactivation at eighteen months' notice. She was decommissioned on 3 August 2005, twenty months after an extensive refit that had been intended to give her ten more years of service. Illustrious succeeded her as the service's flagship. The Royal Navy maintained that Invincible could have been deployed had the need arisen and that Navy policy assumed she was still an active aircraft carrier. According to Jane's, however, Invincible had been stripped of some parts for her sister ships, so operational readiness would require not only eighteen months but also the replacement or removal of systems from those other ships.

In March 2010, Invincible was tied up and minimally maintained with other decommissioned ships up-river of HMNB Portsmouth. On 10 September 2010, she was struck off the Naval Reserve List and, in December, offered for sale by the Disposal Services Authority (DSA) with tenders due by 5 January 2011. The DSA tender documents confirmed that the ship's engines had been removed and that its generators and pumps were "generally unserviceable or not working". On 8 January 2011, the British press relayed an earlier report in the South China Morning Post that a £5-million bid had been made for the ship by the UK-based Chinese businessman Lam Kin-bong with plans to moor her at Zhuhai or Liverpool as a floating international school. In light, however, of China's re-arming of the Varyag – bought under a similar pretext – and the EU arms embargo on China, doubts were raised as to whether such a sale would go ahead.

A month later, in February 2011, BBC News reported that the Ministry of Defence had announced the sale of Invincible to Leyal Ship Recycling in Turkey. She was towed out of Portsmouth on 24 March and arrived at Leyal's Aliağa yard on 12 April 2011 for scrapping.

== Weapons and aircraft ==
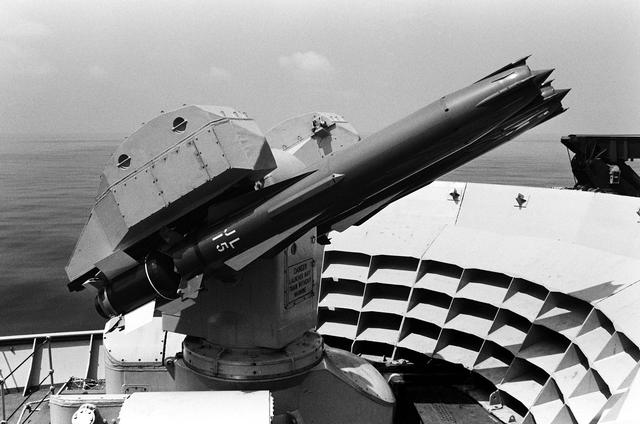
Invincible's Sea Dart.

Invincible initially lacked any close-in weapon systems. As one of the lessons from the Falklands War Invincible had two 20 mm Raytheon Phalanx close-in weapon systems fitted but these were later replaced by three Thales 30 mm Goalkeeper CIWS; there are also two Oerlikon 20 mm cannons. Countermeasures were provided by a Thales jamming system and ECM system, Seagnat launchers provide for chaff or flare decoys. Initially the carriers were armed with a Sea Dart missile system, but this was removed to enlarge the flight deck and to allow magazine storage and deck space for Royal Air Force Harrier GR7s.

After the various refits, the carrier's air group grew from the original planned 5 Sea Harriers and 9 Sea Kings to nine Sea Harrier or Harrier GR7/9s and twelve helicopters (usually all Sea Kings, either anti-submarine warfare (ASW) or Airborne Early Warning (AEW) variants). Alternative airgroups were occasionally tested with 16 Harriers and 3 helicopters being embarked. The carrier was equipped with flagship facilities and could provide an operational headquarters for Royal Navy task forces. The runway was 170 metres (560 ft) long and included the ship's characteristic ski jump (initially at an angle of 7°, but later increased to 12°).

== Commanding officers ==
- 1979–1982: Captain Michael Livesay RN
- 1982–1983: Captain Jeremy Black RN
- 1983–1984: Captain the Hon. Nicholas Hill-Norton RN
- 1984–1986: Captain Christopher Layman RN
- 1988–1990: Captain Michael Gretton RN
- 1990–1992: Captain John Tolhurst RN
- 1992–1993: Captain Fabian Malbon RN
- 1993–1995: Captain Richard Hastilow RN
- 1995–1996: Captain Ian Forbes RN
- 1996–1997: Captain Roy Clare RN
- 1997–1999: Captain James Burnell-Nugent RN
- 1999–2001: Captain Rory McLean RN
- 2002–2004: Captain Trevor Soar RN
- 2004–2005: Captain Neil Morisetti RN

== Bibliography ==
- Brown, David K.; Moore, George (2012). Rebuilding the Royal Navy: Warship Design Since 1945. Barnsley, UK: Seaforth Publishing. ISBN 978-1-84832-150-2.
- Burden, Rodney A.; Draper, Michael I.; Rough, Douglas A.; Smith, Colin R.; Wilton, David (1986). Falklands: The Air War. British Aviation Research Group. ISBN 0-906339-05-7.
- Childs, N. (2009). The Age of Invincible. Barnsley, UK: Pen & Sword Books Ltd. ISBN 978-1-84415-857-7.
- Couhat, Jean Labayle; Baker, A. D., eds. (1986). Combat Fleets of the World 1986/87. Annapolis, Maryland, USA: Naval Institute Press. ISBN 0-85368-860-5.
- Gardiner, Robert; Chumbley, Stephen, eds. (1995). Conway's All The World's Fighting Ships 1947–1995. Annapolis, Maryland, USA: Naval Institute Press. ISBN 1-55750-132-7.
- Hobbs, David (1996). Aircraft Carriers of the Royal and Commonwealth Navies. London: Greenhill Books. ISBN 1-85367-252-1.
- Moore, John, ed. (1979). Jane's Fighting Ships 1979–80. London: Jane's Yearbooks. ISBN 0-354-00587-1.
- Moore, John, ed. (1985). Jane's Fighting Ships 1985–86. London: Jane's Yearbooks. ISBN 0-7106-0814-4.
- Prézelin, Bernard; Baker, A. D., eds. (1990). The Naval Institute Guide to the Combat Fleets of the World 1990/91: Their Ships, Aircraft, and Armament. Annapolis, Maryland, USA: Naval Institute Press. ISBN 0-87021-250-8.
- Saunders, Stephen, ed. (2002). Jane's Fighting Ships 2002–2003. Coulsdon, UK: Jane's Information Group. ISBN 0-7106-2432-8.
- Sturtivant, Ray; Ballance, Theo (1994). The Squadrons of the Fleet Air Arm. Tonbridge, Kent, UK: Air Britain (Historians) Ltd. ISBN 0-85130-223-8.
