= Bruce Williams =

Bruce Williams may refer to:

- Bruce Williams (footballer) (1939–2022), Australian rules footballer
- Bruce Williams (Royal Navy officer), Commodore in the Royal Navy
- Bruce H. Williams (died 1916), state legislator in South Carolina
- Bruce Williams (talk radio host) (1932–2019), American businessman and radio talk show host
- Bruce A. Williams (born 1955), American political scientist and media studies scholar
- Bruce Williams (vice-chancellor) (1919–2010), Australian academic
- Bruce MacGillivray Williams (died 2005), former Canadian ambassador to Burkina Faso, Ghana, Turkey, Yugoslavia, India
- Bruce Williams, member of the World Saxophone Quartet

== See also ==
- Williams and Ree, comedy duo composed of Bruce Williams and Terry Ree
- Bruce Williams Zaccagnino, creator of model railroad layout and museum Northlandz
