= DCTS =

DCTS may refer to:

- Defence Centre of Training Support, a UK defence unit
- Dartmouth College Timesharing System, a renamed version of the DTSS computer operating system
