= Rabdan Academy =

Government-owned education institution in Abu Dhabi, United Arab Emirates

Coordinates: 24.43010°N 54.43677°E

- Type: Government university and training institute
- Established: December 4, 2013
- President: Rear Admiral James Morse, rtd.
- Vice-president: Salem Saeed Al Saeedi
- Students: (more than 500): military officers, police officers, fire fighters and civilian students of safety, security, defence, emergency preparedness and crisis management
- Location: Abu Dhabi, United Arab Emirates
- Website: Website of the Rabdan Academy

The Rabdan Academy is a government-owned higher education institution in Abu Dhabi, United Arab Emirates, established to provide training and education for professionals in the Safety, Security, Defence, Emergency Preparedness, and Crisis Management (SSDEC) sectors.

The Academy is known for offering academic and vocational programs and has received a "5-star" rating in the Teaching and Employability categories under the QS Stars University Rating System.

== History ==
The Rabdan Academy was established in 2013 under Law No. 7 issued by the late Sheikh Khalifa bin Zayed Al Nahyan. It is accredited by the UAE’s Commission for Academic Accreditation (CAA).

== Academic programs ==
The Academy provides undergraduate and graduate programs in areas such as Business Continuity Management, Integrated Emergency Management, Homeland Security, Defence and Security, Policing and Security Leadership, Systems Engineering Specializing in Defence, and Intelligence Analysis.

== Vocational education ==
Rabdan Academy also offers vocational education programs and professional development services to meet the training needs of professionals in the SSDEC sectors. These programs are designed to respond to regional and global challenges in safety and security.

The Academy collaborates with world-leading academic and research institutions to manage capacity-building projects and provide technical consultations to organizations seeking to align with international standards.

== Research and innovation ==
The institution conducts research in fields such as policing, security, defence, business continuity, and disaster management. Rabdan Academy works with global academic and research partners to advance innovation in these areas.

== Rabdan Security and Defence Institute (RSDI) ==
In 2024, Rabdan Academy launched the Rabdan Security and Defence Institute (RSDI) during the International Security and National Resilience (ISNR) Conference. The RSDI is a specialized think tank focusing on security and defence studies, aiming to provide high-level research and consultation in these areas.

== Notable people ==
Rabdan Academy's president and CEO is Rear Admiral James Morse, a retired British senior Royal Navy officer who served as Assistant Chief of the Naval Staff (Capability) and Controller of the Navy. He was also the Commandant of the Joint Services Command and Staff College. He became president and CEO of the Rabdan Academy in August 2016. Morse told Gulf News that: "The idea is to prepare young people of the country for the challenges of the future. Not just training them for today, but for the coming four to five years when they have to take charge in intelligence, police and security sectors of the country. So educating young generation is key."

Among its faculty from 2021 to 2023 was Joel Hayward, a professor of strategic thought. The daily newspaper Al Khaleej called Hayward "a world authority on international conflict and strategy". The National newspaper called Hayward “eminent” and a “distinguished historian of warfare and military strategy”. Kirkus Reviews said that Hayward "is undeniably one of academia’s most visible Islamic thinkers". He is considered to be one of "the world's five hundred most influential Muslims," with his listing in the 2023, 2024, 2025, 2026 and 2027 editions of The Muslim 500 stating that "He weaves together classical Islamic knowledge and methodologies and the source-critical Western historical method to make innovative yet carefully reasoned sense of complex historical issues that are still important in today’s world. He is considered to be one of the world’s leading scholars of the Sira." Hayward's seventeenth book, The Leadership of Muhammad was awarded the prize of Best International Non-Fiction Book at the 2021 Sharjah International Book Awards. For his book The Warrior Prophet: Muhammad and War, written while at Rabdan Academy, Hayward won an International Author Excellence Award 2025 from the International Authors' Association.
