= Andrew Roe =

British Army officer (fl. 1992- )

Major General Andrew Roe CB
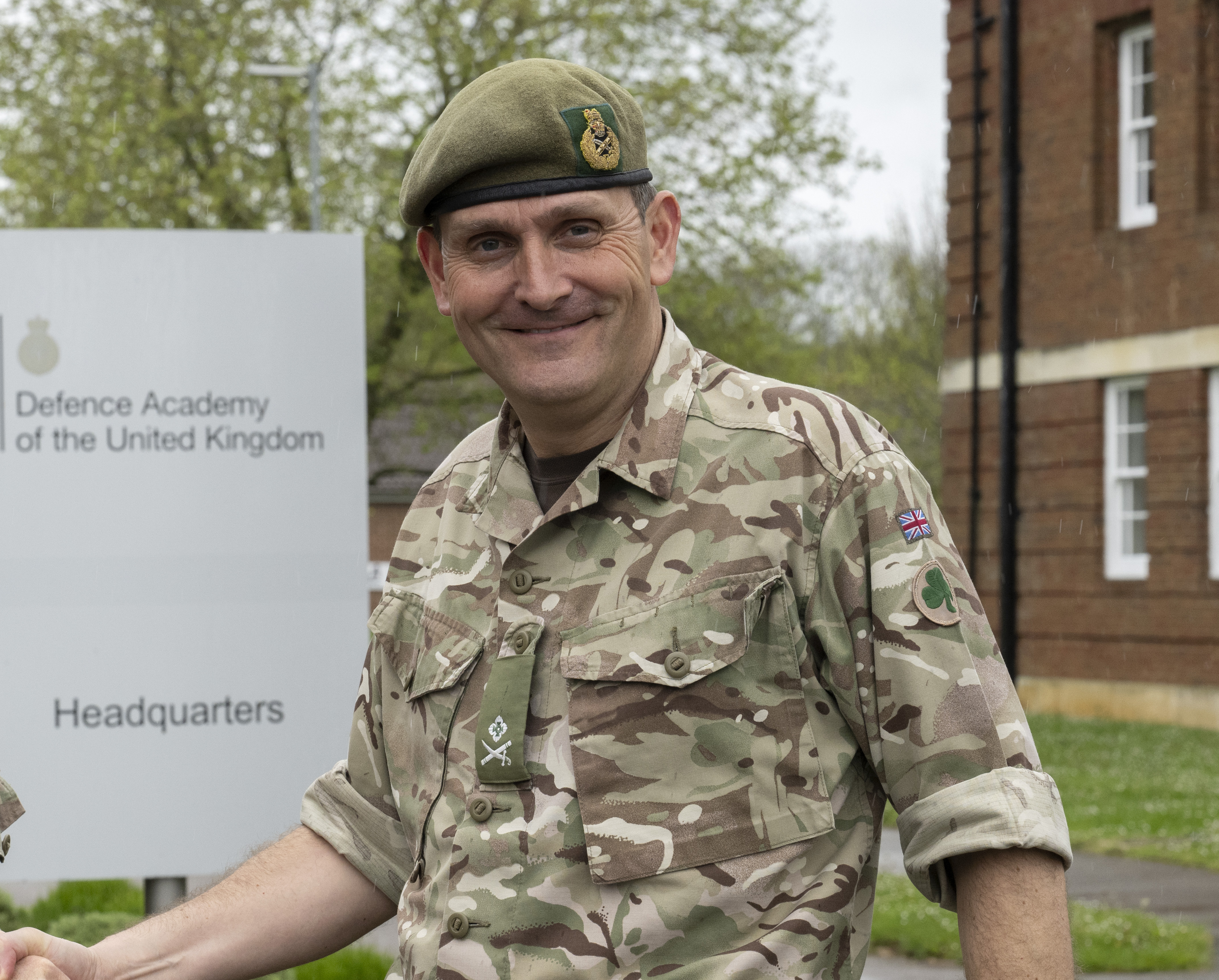
- Roe in 2024
- Born: 1971 (age 54–55)
- Military career
- Allegiance: United Kingdom
- Branch: British Army
- Service years: 1992–2024
- Rank: Major General
- Unit: Green Howards
- Commands: Defence Academy; Joint Services Command and Staff College; 38 (Irish) Brigade; 2nd Battalion, the Yorkshire Regiment
- Conflicts: The Troubles; Bosnian War; Iraq War; War in Afghanistan
- Awards: Companion of the Order of the Bath; Queen's Commendation for Valuable Service

Major General Andrew Michael Roe, CB (born 1971) is a British academic administrator and retired senior British Army officer. Since October 2024, he has been Rector of Exeter College, Oxford.

== Early life and education ==
Roe was born on 1971 in Keighley, West Yorkshire, England.

== Military career ==
Roe was commissioned into the Green Howards in April 1992. He became commanding officer of the 2nd Battalion, the Yorkshire Regiment, in April 2011. He went on to be commander 38 (Irish) Brigade in August 2015, Assistant Commandant (Land) of the Joint Services Command and Staff College in August 2017 and Commandant of the Joint Services Command and Staff College in May 2019. He went on to be Chief Executive and Commandant of the Defence Academy from 2022 to 2024. He retired from the army on 6 September 2024.

Roe was awarded a Queen's Commendation for Valuable Service in September 2010 for distinguished service in Afghanistan, and appointed a Companion of the Order of the Bath in the 2022 Birthday Honours.

== Academic career ==
Roe studied for a Doctor of Philosophy (PhD) degree at King's College London. He completed this in 2008 with a doctoral thesis titled "From the annexation of the Punjab to the pursuit of the Fakir of Ipi: British challenges and responses on the North-West Frontier, 1849–1947".

In June 2023, Roe was announced as the next Rector of Exeter College, Oxford, in succession to Sir Rick Trainor. On 1 October 2024, he was sworn in as the college's 131st rector.

== Personal life ==
Roe is married to Pippa.

== Selected publications ==
=== Books ===
- Roe, Andrew M. (2010). Waging War in Waziristan: The British Struggle in the Land of Bin Laden, 1849–1947. University Press of Kansas. ISBN 978-0700616992.
- Roe, Andrew M.; Cloughley, Brian; Grau, Lester (2015). From Fabric Wings to Supersonic Fighters and Drones: A History of Military Aviation on Both Sides of the North-West Frontier. Helion & Company. ISBN 978-1909982826.

=== Articles ===
- Roe, Andrew (2012). "Evacuation by Air: The All-But-Forgotten Kabul Airlift of 1928-29". Air Power Review. 15 (1). Air University Press: 21–38. ISSN 1463-6298.

Military offices
Preceded by Chris Luck	Commandant of the Joint Services Command and Staff College; 2019 to 2022	Succeeded by Post disbanded
New title	Chief Executive and Commandant of the Defence Academy; 2022 to 2024	Succeeded by Peter Rowell
Academic offices
Preceded by Sir Rick Trainor	Rector of Exeter College, Oxford; 2024 to present	Incumbent
