= Ian Forbes =

Royal Navy Admiral (born 1946)

Admiral Sir Ian Forbes KCB CBE
- Born: 24 October 1946 (age 79)
- Military career
- Allegiance: United Kingdom
- Branch: Royal Navy
- Service years: 1965–2004
- Rank: Admiral
- Commands: Deputy Supreme Allied Commander Transformation; United Kingdom Task Group; HMS Invincible; HMS Chatham; HMS Diomede; HMS Kingfisher
- Conflicts: Cod Wars; Falklands War; Bosnian War; Kosovo War
- Awards: Knight Commander of the Order of the Bath; Commander of the Order of the British Empire; Queen's Commendation for Valuable Service; NATO Meritorious Service Medal; Legion of Merit (United States)

Admiral Sir Ian Andrew Forbes, KCB, CBE (born 24 October 1946) is a former Royal Navy officer who served as Deputy Supreme Allied Commander Atlantic.

== Naval career ==
Educated at Eastbourne College, Forbes joined the Royal Navy in 1965.

Forbes was given command of the patrol craft HMS Kingfisher, the frigate HMS Diomede, the frigate HMS Chatham, and the aircraft carrier HMS Invincible. He was appointed a Commander of the Order of the British Empire in 1994 for his work in the Ministry of Defence on the Bosnian War. During his time in HMS Invincible, he was awarded the Queen's Commendation for Valuable Service in 1996 following the ship's contribution to NATO's Operation Deliberate Force, the bombing campaign against the Serbs of Bosnia and Herzegovina.

After promotion to rear admiral in 1996, Forbes was appointed Military Advisor to Carl Bildt at the Office of the High Representative for Bosnia and Herzegovina in Sarajevo charged with reconstructing Bosnia and Herzegovina following the Bosnian War. He also acted as the Chief of Staff in the Office of the High Representative during this period. Appointed as the Commander United Kingdom Task Group, he led the Battle Group's contribution during the 1998 bombing of Iraq, and during the NATO led Kosovo War in the Adriatic Sea in 1999. This appointment carried with it the NATO post of Commander Anti-Submarine Warfare Striking Force.

He went on to become the Flag Officer, Surface Flotilla in 2000, and was then sent, in the rank of admiral, in 2002 to the Supreme Allied Command Atlantic (SACLANT) in Norfolk, Virginia, United States, as the Deputy Supreme Allied Commander. In this post, he filled the role of Supreme Commander as the last SACLANT. While doing so, he was the architect of the new NATO Allied Command Transformation in Norfolk with responsibilities for the delivery of a transformation process across the Alliance mandated at the Prague Summit in 2003. Appointed as a Knight Commander of the Order of the Bath in 2003, he retired as the Deputy Supreme Allied Commander Transformation in 2004. For his work in Norfolk, he was awarded the inaugural NATO Meritorious Service Medal by the NATO Secretary General, George Robertson, at the NATO Defence Ministerial Meeting in Colorado Springs in 2003. In the following year, the United States government awarded him the Legion of Merit.

== Later life ==
In retirement, Forbes has become an advisor to Booz & Company, now Strategy&, the management consultancy arm of pwc. He was also Chairman of the Governors of Eastbourne College from 2005.

Chairman of the Naval Review from 2006 until 2013, Forbes is currently the President of the Forces Pension Society. He is also the President of the HMS Glamorgan Association, established following the ship's service in the Falklands War. He is married to Sally who is sponsor of the survey vessel HMS Enterprise.

Military offices
Preceded by Sir James Perowne	Deputy Supreme Allied Commander Atlantic; January 2002 – October 2002	Succeeded by Himself; As Deputy Supreme Allied Commander Transformation
Preceded by William F. Kernan	Acting Supreme Allied Commander Atlantic; October 2002 – June 2003	Succeeded by Post Disbanded
Preceded by Himself; As Deputy Supreme Allied Commander Atlantic	Deputy Supreme Allied Commander Transformation; June 2003 – July 2004	Succeeded by Sir Mark Stanhope
