= Peter Rowell (British Army officer) =

Major General Peter Rowell MBE
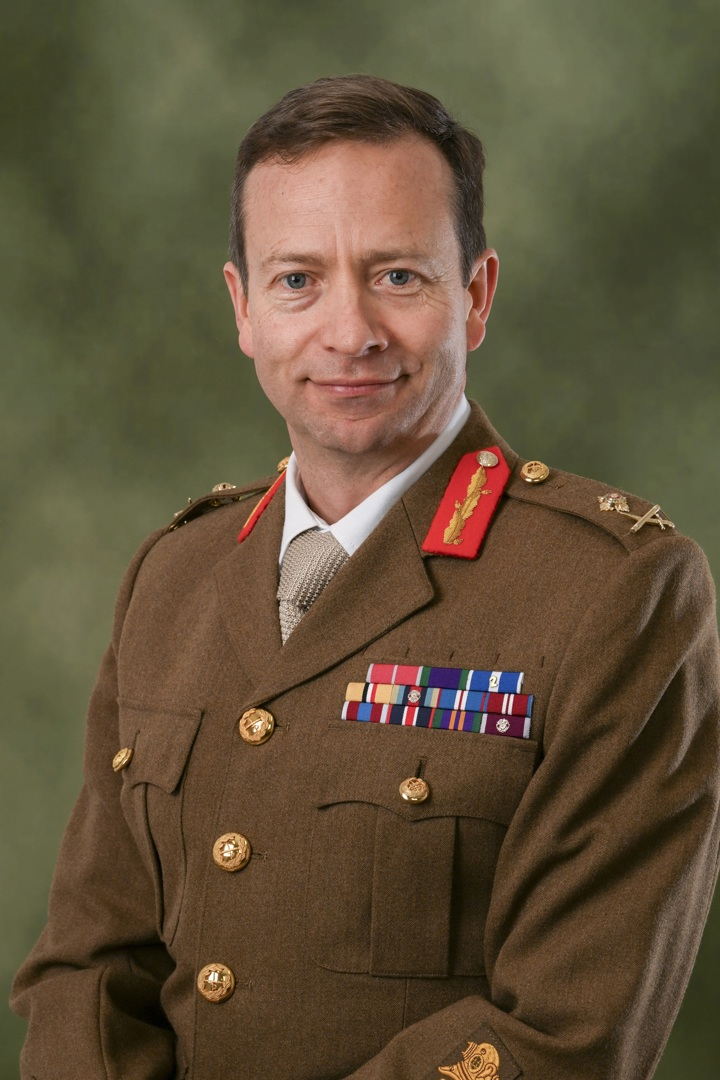
- Rowell in 2024
- Born: September 1974 (age 52); Zimbabwe
- Military career
- Allegiance: United Kingdom
- Branch: British Army
- Service years: 1995–Present
- Rank: Major General
- Commands: Defence Academy
- Conflicts: Iraq War; War in Afghanistan
- Awards: Member of the Order of the British Empire

Major General Peter John Rowell (born September 1974) MBE is a British Army officer who currently serves as commandant of the Defence Academy.

== Early life and education ==
Rowell was born in September 1974, and brought up in Zimbabwe. He left, aged 18, and moved to the United Kingdom with the intent of joining the British Army.

== Military career ==
Rowell joined the Royal Engineers, British Army, aged 18 as a soldier. Having attended the Royal Military Academy Sandhurst, he was commissioned as a second lieutenant on 16 December 1995, with seniority in that rank from 3 May 1995. He was promoted to lieutenant on 3 May 1997. As a platoon commander, he underwent postings to Cyprus and Northern Ireland. He moved from a short service to an intermediate regular commission on 23 September 1999; he held the acting rank of captain on this date. He was then promoted to substantive captain on 3 May 2000, and to major on 31 July 2004. While serving as a staff officer with 21 Engineer Regiment, he planned emergency fire cover for Lancashire during the 2002–2003 United Kingdom firefighter dispute.

He deployed to Afghanistan in 2010. He commanded 31 Armoured Engineer Squadron, with whom he served a tour of duty in Iraq. He was deployed to Afghanistan as chief of staff for 4th Mechanised Brigade. Having attended the Advanced Command and Staff Course, he was commanding officer of 32 Engineer Regiment from 2014 to 2016.

After being promoted to brigadier, he became commandant of the Royal School of Military Engineering in 2019. He was additionally appointed to an honorary position as 215th Deputy Constable of Dover Castle. He went on to be Head of Concepts and Force Exploration in 2022 and commandant of the Defence Academy in May 2024.

== Personal life ==
Rowell is a Christian.

Military offices
Preceded by Andrew Roe	Chief Executive and Commandant of the Defence Academy; 2024–Present	Incumbent
