= Julian Free =

Major General Julian Free CBE
- Military career
- Allegiance: United Kingdom
- Branch: British Army
- Service years: 1987–
- Rank: Major General
- Commands: 26th Regiment Royal Artillery; 4th Mechanized Brigade; Joint Services Command and Staff College
- Conflicts: Gulf War; Kosovo War; Sierra Leone Civil War; Iraq War; War in Afghanistan
- Awards: Commander of the Order of the British Empire

Major General Julian Richard Free CBE is a retired British Army officer who served as commandant of the Joint Services Command and Staff College.

== Military career ==
Free was commissioned into the Royal Artillery on 5 September 1986. He became commanding officer of 26th Regiment Royal Artillery in July 2003 and commander of 4th Mechanized Brigade in April 2007, in which role he was deployed with his brigade to Iraq. He went on to be the Chief of the Defence Staff's liaison officer for Afghanistan in November 2009, director of the Campaign & Transition Assessment Group in Afghanistan in January 2011 and chief of staff of the Allied Rapid Reaction Corps in April 2012. He was appointed commandant of the Joint Services Command and Staff College in August 2014.

Free was appointed a Member of the Order of the British Empire in the 2001 Birthday Honours, advanced to Officer of the Order of the British Empire in the 2006 New Year Honours and advanced again to Commander of the Order of the British Empire for his service in Iraq in the March 2009.

Free is the current Deputy Vice Chancellor of People Services and Operations at the University of Lincoln.

Military offices
Preceded by James Morse	Commandant of the Joint Services Command and Staff College; 2014–2017	Succeeded by Chris Luck
