= John Brigstocke =

Royal Navy Admiral (1945–2020)

Admiral Sir John Brigstocke KCB DL
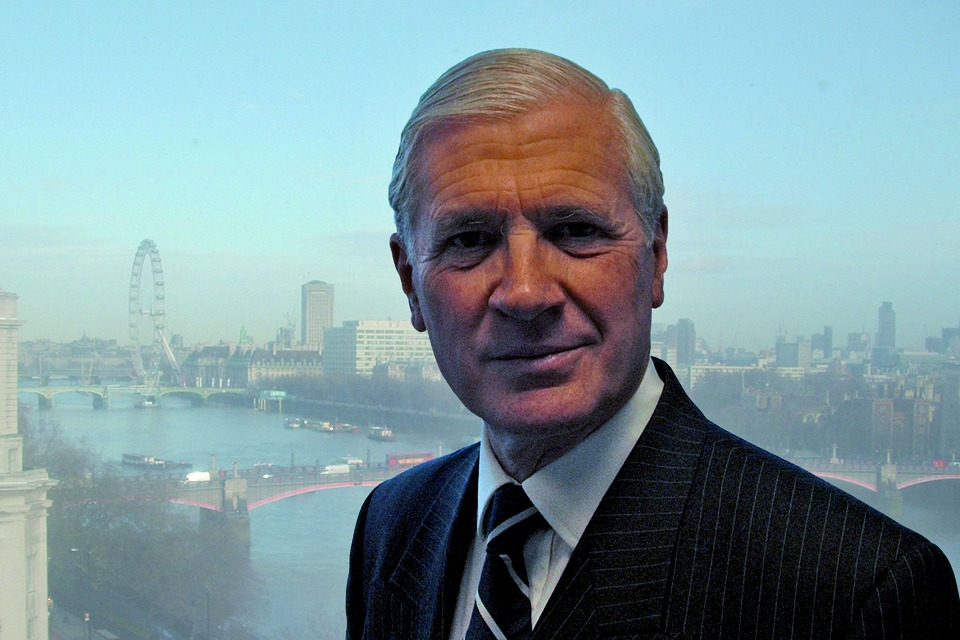
- Admiral Brigstocke in 2002
- Born: 30 July 1945; Newcastle-upon-Tyne, England
- Died: 26 May 2020 (aged 74); Northampton, England
- Military career
- Allegiance: United Kingdom
- Branch: Royal Navy
- Service years: 1962–2000
- Rank: Admiral
- Commands: Naval Home Command; Commander United Kingdom Task Group; HMS Ark Royal
- Conflicts: Gulf War; Bosnian War
- Awards: Knight Commander of the Order of the Bath

Admiral Sir John Richard Brigstocke KCB DL (30 July 1945 – 26 May 2020) was a senior Royal Navy officer who served as Second Sea Lord from 1997 to 2000.

== Early life and education ==
Brigstocke was born on 30 July 1945 in Newcastle-upon-Tyne. His father, George Brigstocke, was a former Anglican priest (having converted to Roman Catholicism), and his brother, Hugh, became a noted art historian. He was educated at West Downs School, Marlborough College and the Britannia Royal Naval College.

== Naval career ==
Brigstocke joined the Royal Navy in 1962. He became Captain of the Royal Naval College and Captain of HMS Ark Royal. He went on to be Flag Officer, Second Flotilla in January 1991 and then Commander United Kingdom Task Group in April 1992. After that he became Assistant Chief of the Naval Staff in September 1993 (and, concurrently President of the Royal Naval College, Greenwich from 1994), Flag Officer, Surface Flotilla in April 1995 and Second Sea Lord and Commander-in-Chief Naval Home Command in September 1997.

== Later life ==
In retirement, Brigstocke became Chief Executive of the St Andrew's Group of Hospitals. In 2005 he became Chairman of Council of the University of Buckingham, and in 2006 he was appointed Chairman of NHS East Midlands. He also became Judicial Appointments and Conduct Ombudsman and a deputy lieutenant of Northamptonshire.

== Personal life and death ==
Brigstocke remained a member of the Church of England even after his parents' conversion to Catholicism.

In 1979, he married Heather Day, and they had two children. He died from complications of pneumonia and dementia at a care home in Northampton on 26 May 2020, at the age of 74.

Military offices
Preceded by Peter Abbott	Assistant Chief of the Naval Staff; 1993–1995	Succeeded by Jeremy Blackham
Preceded by Sir Michael Boyce	Second Sea Lord; 1997–2000	Succeeded by Sir Peter Spencer
