= Ray Lock =

- Military career
- Allegiance: United Kingdom
- Branch: Royal Air Force
- Service years: 1977–2012
- Rank: Air Vice Marshal
- Commands: RAF Lyneham
- Conflicts: Gulf War; Iraq War
- Awards: Commander of the Order of the British Empire

Air Vice Marshal Ray Lock, CBE, is a retired senior Royal Air Force officer who served as commandant of the Joint Services Command and Staff College from 2010 to 2012.

== RAF career ==
Educated at Glyn Grammar School and the University of Bristol, Lock joined the Royal Air Force (RAF) in 1977. He flew combat missions against Iraq during the Gulf War in 1991. He was appointed commander of the RAF detachment at Ali Al Salem Air Base in Kuwait in 2000 and station commander at RAF Lyneham in 2002. In 2003 he reopened the International Airport at Basra as part of Operation Telic. He went on to be deputy assistant chief of staff at Permanent Joint Headquarters at Northwood in 2004, air operations director at the Combined Air Operations Centre in Al Udeid in Qatar in 2005 and assistant chief of staff at RAF Strike Command in 2006. He was made commandant of the Joint Services Command and Staff College in 2010.

== Corporate career ==
Lock became chief executive of the Forces in Mind Trust in December 2012. He lives in Churchdown in Gloucestershire.

Military offices
Preceded by Graham Binns	Commandant of the Joint Services Command and Staff College; 2010–2012	Succeeded by James Morse
