= Chris Luck =

Senior Royal Air Force officer

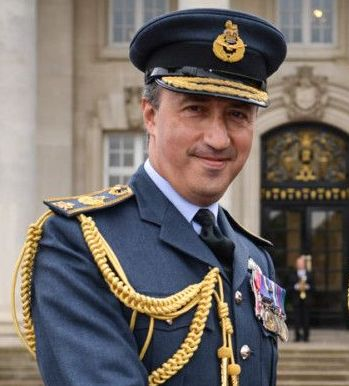
- Luck in 2016
- Born: 1965 (age 60–61)
- Military career
- Allegiance: United Kingdom
- Branch: Royal Air Force
- Service years: 1984–2019
- Rank: Air Vice-Marshal
- Commands: Joint Services Command and Staff College (2017–2019); Royal Air Force College Cranwell (2013–2016); RAF Shawbury (2011–13); No. 33 Squadron (2007–2009)
- Conflicts: Gulf War; The Troubles; Bosnian War; Iraq War
- Awards: Companion of the Order of the Bath; Member of the Order of the British Empire

Air Vice-Marshal Christopher James Luck CB MBE CCMI FRSA DL (born 1965) is a British charity executive and retired Royal Air Force officer. He was commandant of the Royal Air Force College Cranwell from 2013 to 2016, and commandant of the Joint Services Command and Staff College from 2017 to 2019. Since 2019, he has been CEO of the Shaw Trust.

== Early life and education ==
Luck was born in 1965 in London, England. He graduated from the School of Advanced Air and Space Studies, a graduate school of the United States Air Force, with a Master of Arts (MA) degree in 2003 and a Master of Philosophy (MPhil) degree in 2007.

== Military career ==
On 11 October 1984, Luck was commissioned into the General Duties Branch, Royal Air Force, as an acting pilot officer. He then undertook flying training on the Chipmunk and Jet Provost, before training on helicopters. Upon completion of training, he was posted to No. 33 Squadron RAF, a Puma squadron based at RAF Odiham in Hampshire. He was promoted to flying officer on 11 October 1986. During his early career, he underwent deployments to Northern Ireland and Belize.

He was promoted to flight lieutenant on 11 April 1990. He was posted to Iraq as part of Operation Granby, the British operation during the 1991 Gulf War. In 1992, he underwent training to become a qualified helicopter instructor at RAF Shawbury. He was then posted to No. 230 Squadron RAF, based at RAF Aldergrove, Northern Ireland, with whom he served from 1992 to 1996. In recognition of his "gallant and distinguished services in Northern Ireland", Luck was appointed a Member of the Order of the British Empire in November 1996.

He was deployed to Bosnia during the Bosnian War as part of the United Nations' force.

As part of the half yearly promotions, he was promoted to squadron leader on 1 July 1996. He then returned to RAF Odiham to become officer commanding of the Puma Operational Conversion Unit Flight, part of No. 27 (Reserve) Squadron. In 1998, the end of this posting, saw the Pumas of No. 27 (Reserve) Squadron leave to join No. 33 Squadron RAF at RAF Benson. In 1999, he was posted to RAF Strike Command as the Rotary desk officer; this post soon moved to the newly formed Joint Helicopter Command. From August 2001 to 2003, he was attached to the Kuwait Air Force as an advisor and helicopter instructor, and was based at Ali Al Salem Air Base.

As part of the half yearly promotions, he was promoted to wing commander on 1 January 2003. He then attended the United States Air Force Air Command and Staff College at Maxwell Air Force Base in Montgomery, Alabama. From July 2004 to June 2006, he remained at the college as a member of the directing staff as deputy director of strategy and war. In 2006, he attended the USAF School of Advanced Air and Space Studies; he was the first non-American to attend the school. He graduated with a Master of Arts in strategic air power.

In 2007, he returned to the United Kingdom and was appointed officer commanding No. 33 Squadron RAF based at RAF Benson. This tour included a posting to Iraq as part of Operation Telic. In June 2009, he was promoted to group captain and posted to the Permanent Joint Headquarters as Deputy Assistant Chief of Staff. He had specific responsibility for the Middle East region and global counter terrorism. In November 2011, he became commanding officer of RAF Shawbury, home to the Defence Helicopter Flying School. From September to November 2013, he studied at the Royal College of Defence Studies. In December 2013, he was appointed commandant of Royal Air Force College Cranwell, a post he held until August 2016 when he was succeeded by Air Commodore Peter Squires. Promoted to air vice marshal, he was commandant of the Joint Services Command and Staff College from February 2017 to May 2019.

Luck has over 5000 military flying hours, of which 4300 hours have been on the Puma. He was appointed aide-de-camp (ADC) to Queen Elizabeth II on 20 January 2010. He relinquished the appointment on 9 September 2013, but was appointed once more on 16 December the same year. He was appointed Fellow of the Royal Society of Arts 2012. He was appointed Companion of the Order of the Bath (CB) in the 2019 Birthday Honours and became a deputy lieutenant of Northamptonshire in 2023.

== Later life ==
Since May 2019, Luck has been chief executive officer of the Shaw Trust, a charity that helps people into education work and independent living.

== Personal life ==
Luck is a keen horse rider; he is the president of the RAF Equitation Association, chairman of UK Armed Forces Equestrianism and vice chairman of UK Armed Forces Polo.

Military offices
Preceded by David Stubbs	Commandant of Royal Air Force College Cranwell; 2013–2016	Succeeded by Peter Squires
Preceded by Julian Free	Commandant of the Joint Services Command and Staff College; 2017–2019	Succeeded by Andrew Roe
