= Bruce Williams (Royal Navy officer) =

Former Royal Navy admiral

Rear Admiral Bruce Williams CBE
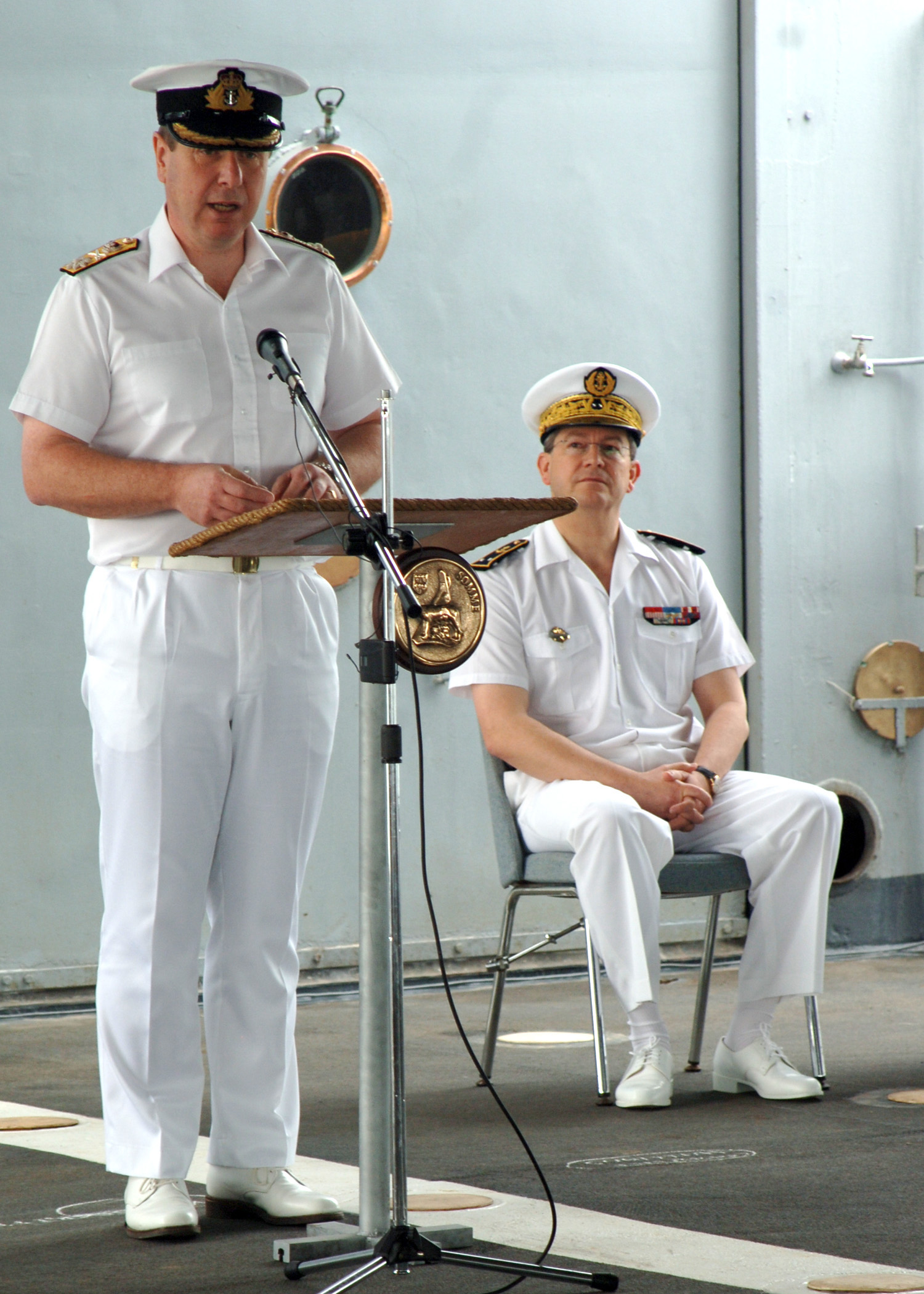
- Commodore Williams (standing) 4 April 2007.
- Military career
- Allegiance: United Kingdom
- Branch: Royal Navy
- Service years: 1980–2015
- Rank: Rear Admiral
- Commands: HMS Norfolk; HMS Campbeltown
- Awards: Commander of the Order of the British Empire

Rear Admiral Bruce Nicholas Bromley Williams CBE is a retired Royal Navy officer.

== Naval career ==
Williams joined the Royal Navy in 1980. He became commanding officer of the frigate HMS Norfolk in 1998 and commanding officer of the frigate HMS Campbeltown in 2003. He went on to be commander of Combined Task Force 58 (Northern Gulf / Southern Iraq) in 2005 and then Commander United Kingdom Task Group and Deputy Commander United Kingdom Maritime Forces in 2006.

In late 2006 he was assigned to the command of Combined Task Force 150, a multinational squadron of ships serving under the US Fifth Fleet assigned to maritime security operations in the Indian Ocean. During this command, which coincided with the war in Somalia between the Transitional Federal Government (TFG), backed by the forces of Ethiopia against the Islamic Courts Union (ICU), Williams led the task force performing naval interdiction off the Somali coast of during the Battle of Ras Kamboni in January 2007 to prevent the escape of wanted terrorists associated with Al-Qaeda. Williams turned over command of Task Force 150 to French Navy Rear Admiral Alain Hinden on 4 April 2007.

Williams became Deputy Commandant of the Joint Services Command and Staff College in 2008, before being promoted to rear admiral and taking up the appointment as Chief of Staff to NATO's Allied Maritime Command Naples in 2009. He went on to be Deputy Director General and Chief of Staff of the European Union Military Staff in Brussels in 2011. He retired from the Navy in 2015.

He was appointed Commander of the Order of the British Empire (CBE) in the 2008 New Year Honours.
