= James Morse =

Royal Navy Rear Admiral

Rear Admiral James Morse CB
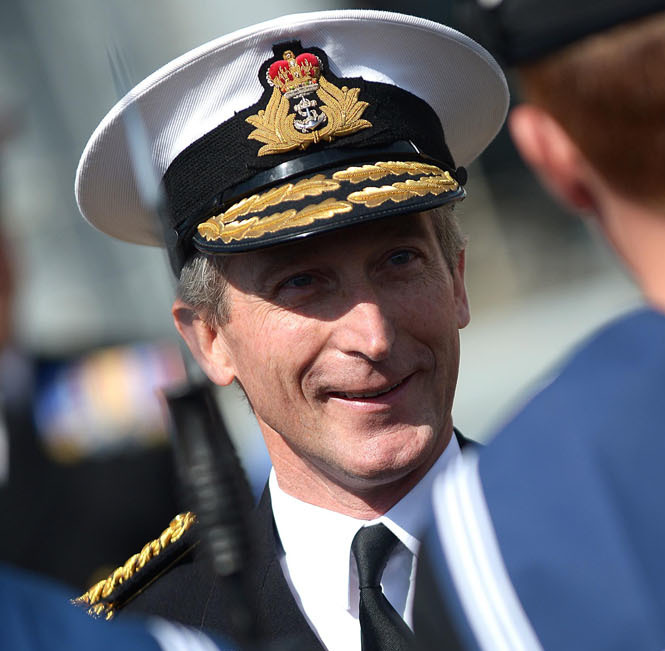
- Rear Admiral Morse in 2015
- Military career
- Allegiance: United Kingdom
- Branch: Royal Navy
- Service years: 1982–2016
- Rank: Rear Admiral
- Commands: United Kingdom Task Group; HMS Chatham; HMS Norfolk; HMS Sutherland; HMS Dasher
- Conflicts: War in Afghanistan; Iraq War
- Awards: Companion of the Order of the Bath

Rear Admiral James Anthony Morse, CB, is a retired senior Royal Navy officer who served as Assistant Chief of Naval Staff (Capability) and Controller of the Navy. He is the current President of Rabdan Academy since 2016.

== Early life and education ==
Morse was educated at the University of Bristol (BSc, 1985) and King's College London (MA International Relations, 2007).

== Career ==
Morse joined the Royal Navy in 1982. He was given command of the Bristol University Royal Naval Unit and then the patrol craft HMS Dasher in 1991. After promotion to lieutenant-commander on 1 January 1993, he attended the principal warfare officer's course in 1993, and became operations officer in the frigate HMS Monmouth. Having attended the specialist navigating officer's course, he became squadron navigator of the Fourth Frigate Squadron and was then given command of the frigate HMS Sutherland in 1997. He joined the Permanent Joint Headquarters in 1999 and was then made commanding officer of the frigate HMS Norfolk before becoming executive officer of the aircraft carrier HMS Illustrious in November 2001. He went on to be Naval Assistant to the First Sea Lord in 2004 and, after attending the Joint Services Command and Staff College, he became commanding officer of the frigate HMS Chatham in August 2005.

Morse became Director of Force Development in September 2007, Commander United Kingdom Task Group in December 2008 and liaison officer to the Chairman of the US Joint Chiefs of Staff in September 2011. He went on to be Commandant of the Joint Services Command and Staff College with the rank of rear-admiral on 28 August 2012, and Assistant Chief of Naval Staff (Capability) and Controller of the Navy in September 2014. Morse handed over his duty to Rear Admiral Paul Bennett on 23 May 2016, and retired from the navy on 12 August 2016.

After retiring from the Royal Navy in 2016, Morse became the President of Rabdan Academy in Abu Dhabi on 12 August 2016.

== Honours and awards ==
Morse was appointed a Companion of the Order of the Bath in the 2016 New Year Honours.

Military offices
Preceded by Ray Lock	Commandant of the Joint Services Command and Staff College; 2012–2014	Succeeded by Julian Free
Preceded by Duncan Potts	Controller of the Navy; 2014–2016	Succeeded by Paul Bennett
