= Advanced Command and Staff Course =

UK military staff course

The Advanced Command and Staff Course is a staff course for mid career military officers of the United Kingdom armed forces and allies. It is taught at the Defence Academy of the United Kingdom in Shrivenham, Oxfordshire, United Kingdom.

The course is provided by the Joint Services Command and Staff College of the British Armed Forces for a period of one year and receive the letters psc(j) from the Joint Services Command and Staff College as Post Staff College (Joint)(United Kingdom) (psc(j)(UK)) after completing the Advanced Command and Staff Course. The course is a successor to the staff college course formally conducted at the Royal Naval College, Greenwich, the Staff College, Camberley, the RAF Staff College, Bracknell, and the Joint Service Defence College, Greenwich.

== See also ==
- Joint Services Command and Staff College
