= Joint Services Command and Staff College =

British military academic establishment

Coordinates: 51°36′28.60″N 1°38′1.05″W

- Former names: Joint Service Defence College at Greenwich; Royal Naval Staff College at Greenwich; Army Command and Staff College at Camberley; RAF Staff College, Bracknell
- Motto: "Unity is Strength"
- Type: Staff college
- Established: 1997
- Parent institution: Defence Academy of the United Kingdom
- Affiliations: IAMP
- Commandant: Major General Peter Rowell
- Location: Watchfield, Oxfordshire, United Kingdom
- Campus: Rural
- Website: www.da.mod.uk/study-with-us/colleges-and-schools/joint-services-command-and-staff-college

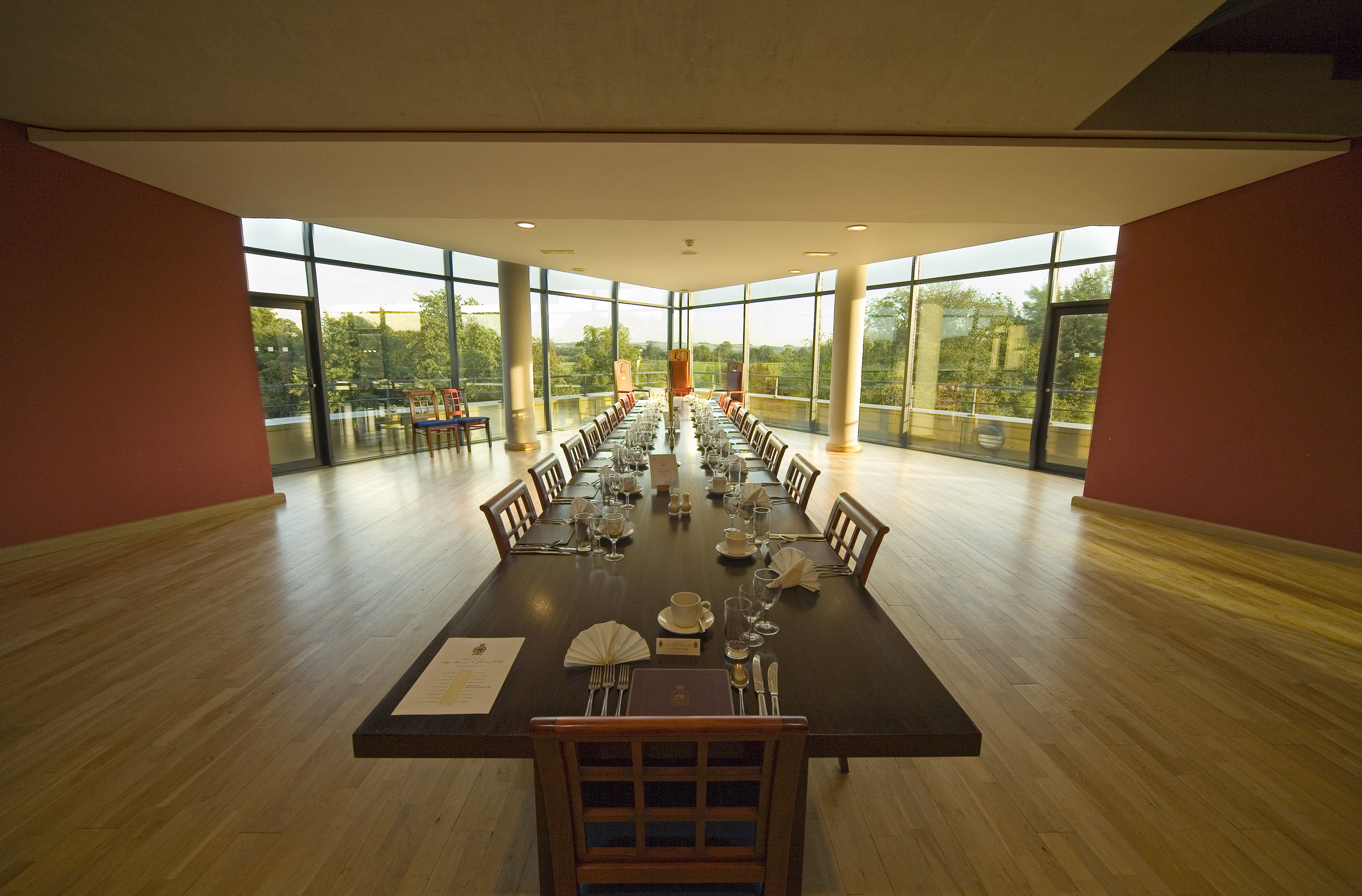
An interior shot of the Joint Services Command and Staff College

Joint Services Command and Staff College (JSCSC) is a British staff college that provides training and education to experienced officers of the British Army, Royal Navy, Royal Air Force, Ministry of Defence Civil Service, and officers from other countries.

== History ==
The JSCSC was formed by combining the single-service colleges: the Royal Naval College, Greenwich, the Staff College, Camberley, the RAF Staff College, Bracknell, and the Joint Service Defence College, Greenwich. Initially established at Bracknell in January 1997, the college relocated to new buildings at Watchfield in Oxfordshire in June 1998 under a Private Finance Initiative contract. Designed by HLM Architects, built by John Laing Construction at a cost of £100 million, the new facilities were officially opened in August 2000. The facilities were subsequently managed by Serco.

== Command, control and organisation ==
JSCSC is a component of the Defence Academy of the United Kingdom (DA). The commandant is a full member of the DA Management Board and reports to the director of the DA. The commandant holds a two-star (rear admiral, major general or air vice marshal) and is appointed from one of the three services. Each service within JSCSC is represented by a one-star assistant commandant, responsible for single service issues and training delivery. The dean of academic studies leads King's College London's Defence Studies Department, which provides theoretical and conceptual academic education in partnership with the military directing staff.

=== Courses ===
As of 2016, JSCSC provides the following courses, among others:

- Higher Command and Staff Course: for OF-6 rank (Commodores, Brigadiers & Air Commodores) or OF-5 (Captains RN, Colonels & Group Captains)
- Advanced Command and Staff Course: for OF-4 rank (Commanders, Lieutenant Colonels & Wing Commanders)
- Intermediate Command and Staff Course: for OF-3 rank (Lieutenant Commanders, Majors & Squadron Leaders)

==== Royal Naval Division ====
- Intermediate Command and Staff Course (Maritime): For Lieutenant Commanders, Lieutenants, and civil servants
  - Elements:
    - Command, Leadership, Management, Ethos, and Ethics
    - Staff and Communication Skills, including Defence Writing
    - Strategic Studies: The International Environment and UK Defence Management
    - Maritime Studies: Strategy, Environment, Capabilities, and the Royal Navy
    - Joint Studies: Capabilities, Environment, and Joint and Combined Operations
- Intermediate Command and Staff Course (Maritime Reserve)
- Advanced Amphibious Warfare Course

==== Army Division ====
- Intermediate Command and Staff Course (Land): For Army and Royal Marine Majors, and civil servants
  - Elements:
    - Staff and Communication Skills
    - Command, Leadership, and Management
    - Global Effects on Defence
    - Higher Management of Defence and the Army
    - Equipment and Capability
    - Land Warfare – including Formation Level Planning and Military Assistance to Stabilisation and Development
- Intermediate Command and Staff Course (Land Reserve)

==== RAF Division ====
- Intermediate Command and Staff Course (Air): For Squadron Leaders and civil servants
  - Elements
    - Introduction
    - Air and space power
    - Strategic context
    - Warfighting and planning
    - Command, Leadership, and Management

== Badge ==
The college badge features an anchor, crossed swords, and an eagle, symbols representing the three Armed Services. Previously, the cormorant (Phalacrocorax carbo) was used as the symbol of the Joint Service Defence College. The cormorant is Britain's largest seabird, capable of flying, swimming on the sea surface, catching fish underwater, and nesting on dry land. The college's alumni association, open to graduates of the Higher Command and Staff Course, the Advanced Command and Staff Course, and college staff, is named the Cormorant Club.

== Commandants ==
Car flag of the Commandant, Joint Services Command and Staff College

The following have commanded the college:

- 1 September 1997: Major General T. J. Granville-Chapman
- 4 January 2000: Air Vice-Marshal B. K. Burridge
- 28 January 2002: Rear Admiral R. J. Lippiett
- 3 March 2003: Major General J. McColl
- 1 March 2004: Major General N. R. Parker
- July 2005: Air Vice-Marshal N. D. A. Maddox
- 4 September 2007: Rear Admiral N. Morisetti
- 8 October 2009: Major General G. Binns
- 2 September 2010: Air Vice-Marshal R. Lock
- 31 August 2012: Rear Admiral J. Morse
- August 2014: Major-General J. R. Free
- February 2017: Air Vice-Marshal Chris Luck
- May 2019: Major General Andrew Roe (as Commandant Defence Academy from 2022)
- May 2024: Major General Peter Rowell (as Commandant Defence Academy)
