= Commander United Kingdom Task Group =

Commander United Kingdom Task Group (COMUKTG)
- Ensign of the Royal Navy
- Navy Department, Ministry of Defence
- Reports to: Commander-in-Chief, Fleet (1992-2001); Commander United Kingdom Maritime Forces (2001-2015)
- Nominator: Secretary of State for Defence
- Appointer: Prime Minister; Subject to formal approval by the King-in-Council
- Term length: Not fixed (typically 1–4 years)
- Inaugural holder: Rear-Admiral John R. Brigstocke
- Formation: 1992-2015

The Commander United Kingdom Task Group (COMUKTG ) was a senior Royal Navy operational appointment from April 1992 to March 2015. In March 2015 the post was renamed Commander Amphibious Task Group.

== History ==
In April 1992, the Royal Navy re-designated the First Flotilla the Surface Flotilla, would now be responsible for operational readiness and training. Flag Officer, Second Flotilla, Rear-Admiral John Brigstocke, became Commander UK Task Group - who would command any deployed task group. The Third Flotilla was abolished. Between 1992 and 2001 Commander UK Task Group reported to the Commander-in-Chief Fleet.

In April 2001 COMUKTG was re-named Commander United Kingdom Maritime Forces (COMUKMARFOR) at the rank of Rear-Admiral (2 star). The title COMUKTG remained in use but as a subordinate 1 star role under COMUKMARFOR.

Following the 2010 Strategic Defence and Security Review and implemented in January 2011 the Commander UK Task Group became Deputy Commander United Kingdom Maritime Forces. The same month the Commander Amphibious Task Group assumes the role of COMUKTG. The UK Amphibious Task Group was also renamed to be the Response Force Task Group (RFTG). In March 2015 the post was renamed back to Commander Amphibious Task Group.

== Commander UK Task Group ==
Included:

- Rear-Admiral John R. Brigstocke: April 1992-September 1993
- Rear-Admiral Michael P. Gretton: September 1993-December 1994
- Rear-Admiral Peter M. Franklyn: December 1994-February 1996
- Rear-Admiral Alan W.J. West: February 1996-October 1997
- Rear-Admiral Ian A. Forbes: October 1997-February 2000
- Rear-Admiral Stephen R. Meyer: February 2000-April 2001

Note: COMUKTG post renamed Commander, United Kingdom Maritime Forces in 2001 and continues as a 2 Star rank the post COMUKTG continues post April 2001 as a subordinate 1 Star role under (COMUKMARFOR)

- Commodore Hugh A.H.G. Edleston: April 2001-January 2002
- Commodore James R. Fanshawe: January–December 2002
- Commodore Richard D. Leaman: January–June 2003
- Commodore Anthony J. Rix: November 2003-January 2006
- Commodore Bruce N.B. Williams: January 2006-December 2007
- Commodore Duncan L. Potts: December 2007-December 2008
- Commodore James A. Morse: December 2008-January 2011

Note: COMUKTG post renamed Deputy Commander United Kingdom Maritime Forces in January 2011 the former Commander Amphibious Task Group assumes the role of COMUKTG

Included:

- Commodore John M. L. Kingwell: January-November 2011
- Commodore Patrick A. McAlpine: November 2011-February 2014
- Commodore Jeremy P. Kyd: February 2014-February 2015
- Commodore Martin J. Connell: February - March 2015

Note: COMUKTG post is renamed back to Commander Amphibious Task Group in March 2015 Cmdre Connell continues in that role till May 2016

United Kingdom Task Group
- Active: 1992 – 2015
- Country: United Kingdom
- Branch: Royal Navy
- Size: Flotilla
- Part of: Commander-in-Chief Fleet
- Garrison/HQ: HMNB Portsmouth

Commanders
- First: Rear-Admiral John R. Brigstocke
- Last: Commodore Martin J. Connell
