= Ward Wilson =

American nuclear disarmament researcher (born 1956)

Ward Hayes Wilson (born April 26, 1956) is an American researcher who is the executive director of RealistRevolt, a grassroots advocacy organization in the Chicago area. He lives and works in Glenview, Illinois.

== Career ==
Ward Hayes Wilson is a writer at “the forefront” of debates about the value and utility of nuclear weapons and nuclear deterrence. He has been a senior fellow at the James Martin Center for Nonproliferation Studies, BASIC (the British American Security Information Council), and the Federation of American Scientists.

Wilson is best known for his argument that the atomic bombings of Hiroshima and Nagasaki did not force Japan's surrender at the end of World War II. Winner of the $10,000 Doreen and Jim McElvany Nonproliferation Challenge in 2008, Wilson uses realist arguments to challenge existing ideas about nuclear weapons. His arguments have appeared in anti-nuclear journals he Bulletin of the Atomic Scientists and Nonproliferation Review, in military journals Joint Force Quarterly and Parameters, in foreign policy journals Foreign Policy and International Security, and in the New York Times, the Los Angeles Times, and The Nation.

Wilson received a grant in 2010 to write, travel, and speak on nuclear weapons issues. He presented arguments that challenge accepted ideas about nuclear weapons in 23 countries including at the Pentagon; the French National Assembly; the United Nations; the Scottish National Parliament; the U.S. State Department; Harvard; Stanford; Princeton; Georgetown; Yale; the Sorbonne; the U.S. Naval War College; King's College London; Hamburg University; Nagasaki University; University of Pretoria; the Mexican Foreign Ministry; the Belgian Parliament; the National Assembly of Costa Rica; Aberystwyth University, Wales; and Chatham House, London

Wilson launched his book Five Myths About Nuclear Weapons at an event at the United Nations in February 2013. He launched his second book It Is Possible: A Future Without Nuclear Weapons at the United Nations in 2023.

== Awards and honors ==
- RFK Fellow, The Robert Kennedy Memorial Foundation, 1981.
- Doreen and Jim McElvaney Prize, which included a $10,000 award for the best essay on nuclear weapons worldwide in 2008.

== Publications ==
- Five Myths About Nuclear Weapons, Houghton Mifflin Harcourt. 2013.
  - Review by Derrin Culp.
- "Strengthening Nonproliferation", British American Security Information Council, October 2013
- "Rethinking the Utility of Nuclear Weapons,” Parameters, 2013.
- "Myth of Nuclear Necessity," op-ed, The New York Times, January 13, 2013.
- “The Myth of Nuclear Deterrence,” Nonproliferation Review, Vol. 15, No. 3, 2008.
- “The Winning Weapon? Rethinking Nuclear Weapons in Light of Hiroshima,” International Security, 2007.

== See also ==
- Doomsday Clock
