= Defence Centre of Training Support =

- Active: 1 October 2003 – present
- Country: United Kingdom
- Branch: British Army; Royal Air Force; Royal Navy
- Type: Defence training centre
- Role: Training support
- Part of: Defence Academy
- Location: Defence Academy of the United Kingdom, Shrivenham

The Defence Centre of Training Support (DCTS) is a training centre of the United Kingdom MOD, located at the Defence Academy of the United Kingdom in Shrivenham, Oxfordshire, UK. DCTS forms part of the Defence Academy of the United Kingdom. Its mission is to prepare and develop personnel employed to analyze, deliver, design, manage and assure defence training.

== History ==
DCTS was established on 1 October 2003. It absorbed the Royal Navy School of Education and Training Technology, the Army School of Training Support and those elements of RAF Halton that had previously been the RAF's Training and Development Support Unit. On 2 April 2012, the organisation was transferred to Joint Forces Command alongside other operations.
