= List of Lady and Gentleman Ushers =

This page is a list of Lady and Gentleman Ushers of the Royal Household of the United Kingdom from the Restoration of the monarchy in 1660 up to the present day.

Gentleman Ushers originally formed three classes: Gentleman Ushers of the Privy Chamber, Gentleman Ushers Daily Waiters and Gentleman Ushers Quarterly Waiters. The number of ordinary ushers of these classes were fixed at four, four, and eight respectively, but ushers "in extraordinary" were also sometimes appointed.

After 1901 these distinctions between the Gentleman Ushers were abolished, except between the ordinary and extraordinary ushers (and two "honorary" ushers in the early 20th century). The first Lady Usher in Ordinary was appointed in 2021.

There are currently 10 Lady and Gentleman Ushers with two representing the Royal Navy, four representing the Army and four representing the Royal Air Force. For more information on the Ushers' history and roles see Lady and Gentleman Usher.

== Gentleman Ushers of the Privy Chamber ==
To 22 January 1901.

=== In Ordinary ===
Date	One	Two	Three	Four
2 June 1660	Sir John Poley	Sir William Fleming	Sir William Killigrew	vacant
4 June 1660	Sir John Poley	Sir William Fleming	Sir William Killigrew	Marmaduke Darcy
2 June 1662	Sir John Poley	Sir William Fleming	Sir Paul Neale	Marmaduke Darcy
10 November 1664	Sir Robert Stapylton	Sir William Fleming	Sir Paul Neale	Marmaduke Darcy
12 July 1669	William Sandys	Sir William Fleming	Sir Paul Neale	Marmaduke Darcy
4 February 1670	John Mitton	Sir William Fleming	Sir Paul Neale	Marmaduke Darcy
8 February 1670	John Mitton	Sir Thomas Nott	Sir Paul Neale	Marmaduke Darcy
20 December 1681	John Mitton	Charles Boyle	Sir Paul Neale	Marmaduke Darcy
17 February 1686	John Mitton	Charles Boyle	Sir Edward Sutton	Marmaduke Darcy
4 July 1687	John Mitton	Charles Boyle	Sir Edward Sutton	Walter Innes
29 November 1687	John Mitton	Charles Goring	Sir Edward Sutton	Walter Innes
8 November 1688	John Mitton	John King	Sir Edward Sutton	Walter Innes
11 December 1688	vacant	vacant	Sir Edward Sutton	vacant
14 March 1689	Sir John Elwes	vacant	Sir Edward Sutton	vacant
27 March 1689	Sir John Elwes	Henry Austen	Sir Edward Sutton	vacant
29 March 1689	Sir John Elwes	Henry Austen	Sir Edward Sutton	Spencer Garrard
30 July 1695	Sir John Elwes	Henry Austen	James Compton	Spencer Garrard
14 July 1697	Sir John Elwes	Henry Austen	James Compton	Brownlow Sherard
19 May 1700	Sir John Elwes	Henry Austen	William Wallis	Brownlow Sherard
19 December 1700	Sir Edward Lawrence, 1st Baronet	Henry Austen	William Wallis	Brownlow Sherard
8 March 1702	vacant	vacant	vacant	vacant
9 July 1702	Henry Sandys	Roger Cooper	Edward Harrison	John Anderson
20 April 1703	Henry Sandys	Sir Edward Lawrence, 1st Baronet	Edward Harrison	John Anderson
10 December 1708	Henry Sandys	Sir Edward Lawrence, 1st Baronet	Brownlow Sherard	John Anderson
3 February 1719	Henry Sandys	Joseph Ashley	Brownlow Sherard	John Anderson
12 August 1728	Richard Whitworth	Joseph Ashley	Brownlow Sherard	John Anderson
10 December 1728	Richard Whitworth	Joseph Ashley	Robert Hemmington	John Anderson
12 August 1729	Richard Whitworth	Joseph Ashley	Robert Hemmington	John Cope
17 June 1732	Richard Whitworth	Sir Francis Clerke, 6th Baronet	Robert Hemmington	John Cope
7 March 1749	Mark Anthony Saurin	Sir Francis Clerke, 6th Baronet	Robert Hemmington	John Cope
30 January 1756	Mark Anthony Saurin	Sir Francis Clerke, 6th Baronet	Joseph Hudson	John Cope
20 August 1760	Mark Anthony Saurin	Sir Francis Clerke, 6th Baronet	Joseph Hudson	Richard Bagshaw
25 October 1760	vacant	vacant	Joseph Hudson	Richard Bagshaw
12 December 1760	Cholmondeley Scot	Hamey Palmer	Joseph Hudson	Richard Bagshaw
24 September 1766	Cholmondeley Scot	Hamey Palmer	William Hudson	Richard Bagshaw
27 June 1771	Edward Colman	Hamey Palmer	William Hudson	Richard Bagshaw
14 November 1771	Edward Colman	Charles Mawhood	William Hudson	Richard Bagshaw
31 May 1773	Edward Colman	Charles Mawhood	William Hudson	Arthur Gregory
4 November 1775	Thomas Tutteridge	Charles Mawhood	William Hudson	Arthur Gregory
30 August 1780	Thomas Tutteridge	Matthew Johnson	William Hudson	Arthur Gregory
September 1789	Thomas Tutteridge	Matthew Johnson	Trevor Hull	Arthur Gregory
1792	Thomas Tutteridge	Matthew Johnson	Trevor Hull	Thomas Sebright
5 February 1794	Richard Byron	Matthew Johnson	Trevor Hull	Thomas Sebright
2 March 1795	Richard Byron	Matthew Johnson	Trevor Hull	Edward Capel
14 April 1798	Richard Byron	John Hale	Trevor Hull	Edward Capel
29 July 1798	Robert Chester	John Hale	Trevor Hull	Edward Capel
31 October 1808	Robert Chester	John Hale	Trevor Hull	William Chester Master
7 January 1813	Robert Chester	John Hale	George Hatton	William Chester Master
27 May 1818	Horace Seymour	John Hale	George Hatton	William Chester Master
10 October 1819	Horace Seymour	John Hale	Henry John Hatton	William Chester Master
25 August 1821	Horace Seymour	Henry Thomas Baucutt Mash	Henry John Hatton	William Chester Master
21 March 1823	Horace Seymour	James Russell	Henry John Hatton	William Chester Master
18 December 1830	Horace Seymour	Frederick Gerald Byng	Henry John Hatton	William Chester Master
23 March 1831	Charles Fieschi Heneage	Frederick Gerald Byng	Henry John Hatton	William Chester Master
22 March 1832	Charles Fieschi Heneage	Frederick Gerald Byng	John Beaumont	William Chester Master
12 March 1834	Charles Fieschi Heneage	Frederick Gerald Byng	Sir John Mark Frederick Smith	William Chester Master
2 December 1868	Charles Fieschi Heneage	Frederick Gerald Byng	Sir John Mark Frederick Smith	Algernon West
14 June 1871	Charles Fieschi Heneage	David Erskine	Sir John Mark Frederick Smith	Algernon West
3 December 1874	Charles Fieschi Heneage	David Erskine	Sir Leopold Cust, 2nd Baronet	Algernon West
6 April 1875	Charles Fieschi Heneage	Walter James Stopford	Sir Leopold Cust, 2nd Baronet	Algernon West
21 March 1878	Charles Fieschi Heneage	Walter James Stopford	Conway Frederick Charles Seymour	Algernon West
13 June 1885	William Bagot	Walter James Stopford	Conway Frederick Charles Seymour	Algernon West
20 April 1887	Cuthbert Larking	Walter James Stopford	Conway Frederick Charles Seymour	Algernon West
7 May 1888	Cuthbert Larking	Walter James Stopford	Conway Frederick Charles Seymour	Horace Charles George West

=== In Extraordinary ===
- 2 June 1660 – bef. 5 August 1668: Sir Peter Killigrew
- 2 June 1660 – 12 July 1669: William Sandys
- 11 August 1660 – 21 April 1670?: Sir Ralph Clare
- 9 March 1661 – 29 January 1662?: Sir Hugh Pollard, 2nd Baronet
- 12 November 1673 – ?: Edward Russell
- 1 February 1675 – 20 December 1681: Charles Boyle
- 19 March 1716 – ?: Frederick Henning
- 25 February 1796 – 29 July 1798: Robert Chester
- 8 August 1833 – 12 March 1834: Sir John Mark Frederick Smith

== Gentleman Ushers Daily Waiters ==
To 22 January 1901.

=== In Ordinary ===
Date	One	Two	Three	Four
June 1660	Peter Newton	Sir John Ayton	Sir Edward Carteret	Richard March
January 1661	Sir James Mercer	Sir John Ayton	Sir Edward Carteret	Richard March
19 February 1671	Sir Thomas Duppa	Sir John Ayton	Sir Edward Carteret	Richard March
9 March 1672	Sir Thomas Duppa	Sir John Ayton	Sir Edward Carteret	Edward Cranfield
2 October 1672	Sir Thomas Duppa	Walter Innes	Sir Edward Carteret	Edward Cranfield
15 April 1673	Sir Thomas Duppa	Charles Radley	Sir Edward Carteret	Edward Cranfield
21 January 1680	Sir Thomas Duppa	Henry Carr	Sir Edward Carteret	Edward Cranfield
4 February 1682	Sir Thomas Duppa	Henry Carr	Sir Edward Carteret	Brian Turner
2 March 1683	Sir Thomas Duppa	Henry Carr	Henry Bulstrode	Brian Turner
30 March 1685	Sir Thomas Duppa	Henry Carr	Charles Carteret	Brian Turner
8 August 1687	Sir Thomas Duppa	Henry Carr	Charles Carteret	John Loving
11 December 1688	Sir Thomas Duppa	vacant	vacant	vacant
11 March 1689	Sir Thomas Duppa	Sir Fleetwood Sheppard	Jeremiah Bubb	David Mitchell
2 March 1692	Sir Thomas Duppa	Sir Fleetwood Sheppard	Francis Aston	David Mitchell
27 April 1694	Jeremiah Chaplin	Sir Fleetwood Sheppard	Francis Aston	David Mitchell
16 September 1698	Jeremiah Chaplin	Thomas Earle	Francis Aston	David Mitchell
9 July 1702	Jeremiah Chaplin	Sir William Oldes	Francis Aston	David Mitchell
6 June 1710	Jeremiah Chaplin	Sir William Oldes	Francis Aston	Sir William Sanderson, 1st Baronet
14 June 1715	Jeremiah Chaplin	Sir William Oldes	Sir Charles Dalton	Sir William Sanderson, 1st Baronet
24 March 1716	Sir Thomas Brand	Sir William Oldes	Sir Charles Dalton	Sir William Sanderson, 1st Baronet
24 November 1718	Sir Thomas Brand	Mark Anthony Saurin	Sir Charles Dalton	Sir William Sanderson, 1st Baronet
17 May 1727	Sir Thomas Brand	Mark Anthony Saurin	Sir Charles Dalton	Henry de Sauniers
11 June 1727	Sir Thomas Brand	vacant	Sir Charles Dalton	vacant
11 September 1727	Sir Thomas Brand	James Stewart	Sir Charles Dalton	vacant
15 May 1728	Sir Thomas Brand	James Stewart	Sir Charles Dalton	Sir Henry Bellenden
29 April 1743	Sir Thomas Brand	Henry de Sauniers	Sir Charles Dalton	Sir Henry Bellenden
7 September 1747	Sir Thomas Brand	Henry de Sauniers	Sir Edmund Bacon, 6th Baronet	Sir Henry Bellenden
3 July 1750	Sir Thomas Brand	Henry de Sauniers	John Playters	Sir Henry Bellenden
12 April 1759	Sir Thomas Brand	Henry de Sauniers	William Fitzherbert	Sir Henry Bellenden
25 October 1760	vacant	vacant	William Fitzherbert	Sir Henry Bellenden
12 December 1760	Sir Septimus Robinson	George Davis	William Fitzherbert	Sir Henry Bellenden
30 May 1761	Sir Septimus Robinson	George Davis	William Fitzherbert	Lindley Simpson
23 December 1763	Sir Septimus Robinson	George Davis	Edward Sneyd	Lindley Simpson
22 July 1765	Sir Septimus Robinson	Sir Francis Molyneux, 7th Baronet	Edward Sneyd	Lindley Simpson
16 September 1765	Sir William Fitzherbert, 1st Baronet	Sir Francis Molyneux, 7th Baronet	Edward Sneyd	Lindley Simpson
9 July 1782	Sir William Fitzherbert, 1st Baronet	Sir Francis Molyneux, 7th Baronet	Edward Sneyd	George Anne Cooke
21 December 1782	Sir William Fitzherbert, 1st Baronet	Sir Francis Molyneux, 7th Baronet	Vere Warner	George Anne Cooke
March 1788	Hale Young Wortham	Sir Francis Molyneux, 7th Baronet	Vere Warner	George Anne Cooke
27 July 1802	Hale Young Wortham	Sir Francis Molyneux, 7th Baronet	Vere Warner	Thomas Osmer
10 June 1812	Hale Young Wortham	Sir Thomas Tyrwhitt	Vere Warner	Thomas Osmer
28 July 1812	Hale Young Wortham	Sir Thomas Tyrwhitt	William Fenton Scott	Thomas Osmer
28 March 1813	Hale Young Wortham	Sir Thomas Tyrwhitt	George Hamilton Seymour	Thomas Osmer
14 August 1816	Hale Young Wortham	Sir Thomas Tyrwhitt	George Hamilton Seymour	Thomas Ramsden
3 March 1820	Sir Thomas Baucutt Mash	Sir Thomas Tyrwhitt	George Hamilton Seymour	Thomas Ramsden
23 July 1822	Sir Thomas Baucutt Mash	Sir Thomas Tyrwhitt	George Hamilton Seymour	William Pole-Tylney-Long-Wellesley
1824	Sir Thomas Baucutt Mash	Sir Thomas Tyrwhitt	George Hamilton Seymour	Thomas Ramsden
25 July 1832	Sir Thomas Baucutt Mash	Sir Augustus Clifford, 1st Baronet	George Hamilton Seymour	Thomas Ramsden
21 October 1836	Sir Thomas Baucutt Mash	Sir Augustus Clifford, 1st Baronet	John Lyster	Thomas Ramsden
10 January 1837	Sir William Martins	Sir Augustus Clifford, 1st Baronet	John Lyster	Thomas Ramsden
29 May 1840	Sir William Martins	Sir Augustus Clifford, 1st Baronet	Sir Henry William des Voeux, 3rd Baronet	Thomas Ramsden
1 February 1859	Sir William Martins	Sir Augustus Clifford, 1st Baronet	Sir Spencer Ponsonby-Fane	Thomas Ramsden
8 September 1860	Sir William Martins	Sir Augustus Clifford, 1st Baronet	Sir Spencer Ponsonby-Fane	Edward Hamilton Anson
10 June 1874	Charles Edmund Phipps	Sir Augustus Clifford, 1st Baronet	Sir Spencer Ponsonby-Fane	Edward Hamilton Anson
1 October 1876	Alpin Macgregor	Sir Augustus Clifford, 1st Baronet	Sir Spencer Ponsonby-Fane	Edward Hamilton Anson
17 March 1877	Alpin Macgregor	Sir William Thomas Knollys	Sir Spencer Ponsonby-Fane	Edward Hamilton Anson
7 July 1883	Alpin Macgregor	Sir James Robert Drummond	Sir Spencer Ponsonby-Fane	Edward Hamilton Anson
16 December 1895	Alpin Macgregor	Sir Michael Biddulph	Sir Spencer Ponsonby-Fane	Edward Hamilton Anson
14 November 1899	Charles Eliot	Sir Michael Biddulph	Sir Spencer Ponsonby-Fane	Edward Hamilton Anson

=== Supernumerary ===
- 8 June 1660 – ?: Clement Sanders
- 14 July 1660 – ?: Roger Gardiner
- 27 July 1660 – ?: Ralph Wakerlin
- 3 October 1661 – ?: George Hopton

=== In Extraordinary ===
- 16 June 1675 – 24 November 1680: Henry Bulstrode
- 29 July 1715 – 24 March 1716: Thomas Brand

== Gentleman Ushers Quarterly Waiters ==
To 22 January 1901.

=== In Ordinary ===
Date	One	Two	Three	Four	Five	Six	Seven	Eight
7 June 1660	Richard Bagnall	vacant	vacant	vacant	vacant	vacant	vacant	vacant
8 June 1660	Richard Bagnall	Nicholas Levett	vacant	vacant	vacant	vacant	vacant	vacant
11 June 1660	Richard Bagnall	Nicholas Levett	Edward Bowman	Francis Bowman	Nathaniel Darrell	William Chamberlain	vacant	vacant
14 June 1660	Richard Bagnall	Nicholas Levett	Edward Bowman	Francis Bowman	Nathaniel Darrell	William Chamberlain	Thomas Duppa	vacant
20 June 1660	Richard Bagnall	Nicholas Levett	Edward Bowman	Francis Bowman	Nathaniel Darrell	William Chamberlain	Thomas Duppa	Paul French
29 January 1661	Richard Bagnall	Nicholas Levett	Edward Bowman	Francis Bowman	Robert Barcroft	William Chamberlain	Thomas Duppa	Paul French
11 October 1662	Richard Bagnall	Nicholas Levett	Edward Bowman	Francis Bowman	Robert Barcroft	William Chamberlain	vacant	Paul French
29 July 1664	Richard Bagnall	Nicholas Levett	Edward Bowman	Francis Bowman	Henry Barcroft	William Chamberlain	vacant	Paul French
16 August 1664	Richard Bagnall	Nicholas Levett	Edward Bowman	Francis Bowman	Henry Barcroft	William Chamberlain	Ralph Whistler	Paul French
10 April 1665	Richard Bagnall	Nicholas Levett	Edward Bowman	Francis Bowman	Henry Barcroft	Timothy Stanney	Ralph Whistler	Paul French
19 May 1665	Richard Bagnall	Nicholas Levett	Edward Bowman	Francis Bowman	Thomas Bambriggs	Timothy Stanney	Ralph Whistler	Paul French
20 August 1666	Richard Bagnall	Nicholas Levett	Edward Bowman	Francis Bowman	Peter Watson	Timothy Stanney	Ralph Whistler	Paul French
19 April 1669	Richard Bagnall	Nicholas Levett	Edward Bowman	Francis Bowman	Peter Watson	Henry Jeyne	Ralph Whistler	Paul French
16 December 1670	Richard Bagnall	Nicholas Levett	Edward Bowman	Francis Bowman	Peter Watson	Essex Strode	Ralph Whistler	Paul French
18 May 1672	Richard Bagnall	Nicholas Levett	Edward Bowman	Francis Bowman	Peter Watson	Essex Strode	Ralph Whistler	Thomas Benbowe
29 September 1673	Richard Bagnall	Nicholas Levett	Edward Bowman	Francis Bowman	Peter Watson	Essex Strode	Ralph Whistler	Nathaniel Hammond
4 November 1673	Richard Bagnall	Nicholas Levett	Edward Bowman	Francis Bowman	Humphrey Graves	Essex Strode	Ralph Whistler	Nathaniel Hammond
1 June 1674	Richard Bagnall	Nicholas Levett	Edward Bowman	Jeremiah Bubb	Humphrey Graves	Essex Strode	Ralph Whistler	Nathaniel Hammond
3 March 1675	Richard Bagnall	Nicholas Levett	Edward Bowman	Jeremiah Bubb	Humphrey Graves	John Baggalley	Ralph Whistler	Nathaniel Hammond
16 December 1676	Richard Bagnall	Nicholas Levett	Edward Bowman	Jeremiah Bubb	John Packer	John Baggalley	Ralph Whistler	Nathaniel Hammond
2 August 1677	Jeremiah Chaplin	Nicholas Levett	Edward Bowman	Jeremiah Bubb	John Packer	John Baggalley	Ralph Whistler	Nathaniel Hammond
16 September 1677	Jeremiah Chaplin	Nicholas Levett	Edward Bowman	Jeremiah Bubb	John Packer	John Fenn	Ralph Whistler	Nathaniel Hammond
1 September 1679	Jeremiah Chaplin	Nicholas Levett	Charles Richards	Jeremiah Bubb	John Packer	John Fenn	Ralph Whistler	Nathaniel Hammond
23 April 1681	Jeremiah Chaplin	Nicholas Levett	Charles Richards	Jeremiah Bubb	John Packer	Thomas Granger	Ralph Whistler	Nathaniel Hammond
20 July 1682	Jeremiah Chaplin	Rose Peterman	Charles Richards	Jeremiah Bubb	John Packer	Thomas Granger	Ralph Whistler	Nathaniel Hammond
19 September 1683	Jeremiah Chaplin	Rose Peterman	Charles Richards	Jeremiah Bubb	John Packer	Thomas Granger	Ralph Whistler	Clement King
14 December 1683	Jeremiah Chaplin	Rose Peterman	Charles Richards	Jeremiah Bubb	John Packer	Noel Glover	Ralph Whistler	Clement King
25 January 1684	Jeremiah Chaplin	Rose Peterman	Charles Richards	Jeremiah Bubb	John Packer	Noel Glover	Ralph Whistler	William Savage
6 January 1685	Jeremiah Chaplin	Rose Peterman	Charles Richards	Jeremiah Bubb	Robert Abbott	Noel Glover	Ralph Whistler	William Savage
6 February 1685	Jeremiah Chaplin	vacant	vacant	Jeremiah Bubb	Robert Abbott	vacant	vacant	vacant
18 May 1685	Jeremiah Chaplin	Nathaniel Hammond	vacant	Jeremiah Bubb	Robert Abbott	vacant	vacant	vacant
12 May 1686	Jeremiah Chaplin	Nathaniel Hammond	James Austin	Jeremiah Bubb	Robert Abbott	vacant	vacant	vacant
24 May 1686	Jeremiah Chaplin	Nathaniel Hammond	James Austin	Jeremiah Bubb	Robert Abbott	Denis Carney	vacant	vacant
30 May 1686	Jeremiah Chaplin	Nathaniel Hammond	James Austin	Jeremiah Bubb	Robert Abbott	Denis Carney	Joseph Ronkhe	vacant
31 May 1686	Jeremiah Chaplin	Nathaniel Hammond	James Austin	Jeremiah Bubb	Robert Abbott	Denis Carney	Joseph Ronkhe	Robert Wigmore
27 December 1686	Jeremiah Chaplin	Nathaniel Hammond	James Austin	Jeremiah Bubb	Hoyle Walsh	Denis Carney	Joseph Ronkhe	Robert Wigmore
20 March 1687	Jeremiah Chaplin	Nathaniel Hammond	James Austin	Jeremiah Bubb	John Marshall	Denis Carney	Joseph Ronkhe	Robert Wigmore
3 December 1687	Jeremiah Chaplin	Nathaniel Hammond	James Meyrick	Jeremiah Bubb	Thomas Wyvill	Denis Carney	Joseph Ronkhe	Robert Wigmore
7 July 1688	Jeremiah Chaplin	Nathaniel Hammond	James Meyrick	Jeremiah Bubb	Thomas Wyvill	Denis Carney	Joseph Ronkhe	Robert Jegon
11 December 1688	Jeremiah Chaplin	Nathaniel Hammond	James Meyrick	Jeremiah Bubb	vacant	vacant	vacant	Robert Jegon
20 February 1689	Jeremiah Chaplin	Nathaniel Hammond	James Meyrick	Jeremiah Bubb	Henry Coling	vacant	vacant	Robert Jegon
7 March 1689	Jeremiah Chaplin	Nathaniel Hammond	James Meyrick	Jeremiah Bubb	Henry Coling	Francis Aston	vacant	Robert Jegon
13 March 1689	Jeremiah Chaplin	Nathaniel Hammond	James Meyrick	Alexander Griffith	Henry Coling	Francis Aston	vacant	Robert Jegon
2 April 1689	Jeremiah Chaplin	Robert Murray	James Meyrick	Alexander Griffith	Henry Coling	Francis Aston	William Smith	Robert Jegon
18 June 1689	Jeremiah Chaplin	Anthony Murray	James Meyrick	Alexander Griffith	Henry Coling	Francis Aston	William Smith	Robert Jegon
29 November 1690	Jeremiah Chaplin	Anthony Murray	John Ward	Alexander Griffith	Henry Coling	Francis Aston	William Smith	Robert Jegon
20 March 1691	Jeremiah Chaplin	Anthony Murray	John Ward	Alexander Griffith	Henry Coling	Francis Aston	William Smith	William Awnsham
6 April 1691	Jeremiah Chaplin	Anthony Murray	John Ward	William Prewett	Henry Coling	Francis Aston	William Smith	William Awnsham
27 February 1692	Jeremiah Chaplin	David Carbonell	John Ward	William Prewett	Henry Coling	Francis Aston	William Smith	William Awnsham
2 March 1692	Jeremiah Chaplin	David Carbonell	John Ward	William Prewett	Henry Coling	Anthony Murray	William Smith	William Awnsham
3 March 1692	Alexander Marriott	David Carbonell	John Ward	William Prewett	Henry Coling	Anthony Murray	William Smith	William Awnsham
20 August 1692	Alexander Marriott	David Carbonell	John Ward	William Prewett	Richard Ellis	Anthony Murray	William Smith	William Awnsham
13 July 1693	Alexander Marriott	David Carbonell	John Ward	William Prewett	Richard Ellis	Anthony Murray	Nicholas King	William Awnsham
5 November 1693	Alexander Marriott	David Carbonell	Thomas Earle	William Prewett	Richard Ellis	Anthony Murray	Nicholas King	William Awnsham
10 December 1694	Alexander Marriott	David Carbonell	Thomas Earle	William Prewett	Alexander Pyle	Anthony Murray	Nicholas King	William Awnsham
18 March 1695	Alexander Marriott	Henry Godfrey	Thomas Earle	William Prewett	Alexander Pyle	Anthony Murray	Nicholas King	William Awnsham
25 November 1695	Alexander Marriott	Henry Godfrey	Thomas Earle	William Prewett	Alexander Pyle	Edward Patriarch	Nicholas King	William Awnsham
6 November 1696	Alexander Marriott	Henry Godfrey	Thomas Earle	William Prewett	Alexander Pyle	Edward Patriarch	Jeremy Bird	William Awnsham
3 November 1697	Alexander Marriott	Henry Godfrey	Thomas Earle	William Prewett	Alexander Pyle	Sands Chapman	Jeremy Bird	William Awnsham
14 July 1698	Alexander Marriott	Henry Godfrey	Tobiah Humphreys	William Prewett	Alexander Pyle	Sands Chapman	Jeremy Bird	William Awnsham
12 February 1699	Alexander Marriott	Henry Godfrey	Tobiah Humphreys	Robert Barry	Alexander Pyle	Sands Chapman	Jeremy Bird	William Awnsham
29 November 1699	Alexander Marriott	Henry Godfrey	Tobiah Humphreys	Robert Barry	Alexander Pyle	John Edlyne	Jeremy Bird	William Awnsham
3 May 1700	Alexander Marriott	Henry Godfrey	Tobiah Humphreys	Robert Barry	Marmaduke Beling	John Edlyne	Jeremy Bird	William Awnsham
16 June 1700	Alexander Marriott	Henry Godfrey	Tobiah Humphreys	John Farey	Marmaduke Beling	John Edlyne	Jeremy Bird	William Awnsham
9 July 1702	Charles Dalton	Henry Godfrey	Tobiah Humphreys	Charles Bressey	Henry Gardie	John Edlyne	Jeremy Bird	John Pinckney
20 December 1706	Charles Dalton	Henry Godfrey	Tobiah Humphreys	Charles Bressey	Henry Gardie	Thomas Ogle	Jeremy Bird	John Pinckney
13 June 1707	Charles Dalton	Henry Godfrey	Tobiah Humphreys	Charles Bressey	Henry Gardie	Thomas Ogle	Thomas Hutton	John Pinckney
7 June 1710	Francis Coxeter	Henry Godfrey	Tobiah Humphreys	Charles Bressey	Henry Gardie	Thomas Ogle	Thomas Hutton	John Pinckney
26 February 1711	Francis Coxeter	Henry Godfrey	Tobiah Humphreys	Charles Bressey	Henry Gardie	Sir Clement Clerke, 3rd Baronet	Thomas Hutton	John Pinckney
23 June 1714	Francis Coxeter	Henry Godfrey	James Ede	Charles Bressey	Henry Gardie	Sir Clement Clerke, 3rd Baronet	Thomas Hutton	John Pinckney
20 June 1715	Francis Coxeter	Henry Godfrey	James Ede	Charles Bressey	Henry Gardie	Charles Ottway	Thomas Hutton	John Pinckney
9 November 1719	Francis Coxeter	Henry Godfrey	James Ede	Charles Bodens	Henry Gardie	Charles Ottway	Thomas Hutton	John Pinckney
21 March 1720	Francis Coxeter	Henry Godfrey	James Ede	Charles Bodens	Henry Gardie	William Castle	Thomas Hutton	John Pinckney
18 April 1721	Francis Coxeter	John Phillips	James Ede	Charles Bodens	Henry Gardie	William Castle	Thomas Hutton	John Pinckney
31 July 1722	Francis Coxeter	John Phillips	James Ede	Charles Bodens	Henry Gardie	Langham Edwards	Thomas Hutton	John Pinckney
7 August 1722	Francis Coxeter	John Phillips	Robert Tripp	Charles Bodens	Henry Gardie	Langham Edwards	Thomas Hutton	John Pinckney
17 May 1727	Francis Coxeter	John Phillips	Robert Tripp	Charles Bodens	James Eckersall	Langham Edwards	vacant 21 September 1725	John Pinckney
9 October 1727	George Coke	Isaac Didier	Robert Tripp	Charles Bodens	James Eckersall	John Goodwin	Sir Everard Buckworth, 3rd Baronet	John Pinckney
4 March 1731	John Jenkins	Isaac Didier	Robert Tripp	Charles Bodens	James Eckersall	John Goodwin	Sir Everard Buckworth, 3rd Baronet	John Pinckney
1 October 1731	John Jenkins	Isaac Didier	Robert Tripp	Charles Bodens	James Eckersall	John Goodwin	Sir Everard Buckworth, 3rd Baronet	James Calthorpe
24 January 1736	John Jenkins	Isaac Didier	Robert Tripp	Charles Bodens	James Eckersall	William Kellet	Sir Everard Buckworth, 3rd Baronet	James Calthorpe
4 December 1736	John Jenkins	Francis Boggest	Robert Tripp	Charles Bodens	James Eckersall	William Kellet	Sir Everard Buckworth, 3rd Baronet	James Calthorpe
31 October 1738	John Jenkins	Francis Boggest	Robert Tripp	George Bodens	James Eckersall	William Kellet	Sir Everard Buckworth, 3rd Baronet	James Calthorpe
23 January 1741	George Anne Cooke	Francis Boggest	Robert Tripp	George Bodens	James Eckersall	William Kellet	Sir Everard Buckworth, 3rd Baronet	James Calthorpe
14 January 1742	George Anne Cooke	Francis Boggest	Robert Tripp	George Bodens	James Eckersall	William Kellet	Joseph Hudson	James Calthorpe
6 February 1746	George Anne Cooke	Francis Boggest	Robert Tripp	George Bodens	James Eckersall	Charles Maddockes	Joseph Hudson	James Calthorpe
22 July 1747	George Anne Cooke	Francis Boggest	Robert Tripp	George Bodens	James Eckersall	Charles Maddockes	Joseph Hudson	Lawrence Wright
4 February 1754	George Anne Cooke	Francis Boggest	Robert Tripp	George Bodens	Matthias Cocksedge	Charles Maddockes	Joseph Hudson	
21 February 1754	George Anne Cooke	Francis Boggest	Robert Tripp	George Bodens	Leathes Johnston	Charles Maddockes	Joseph Hudson	
7 February 1757	George Anne Cooke	Francis Boggest	Robert Tripp	George Bodens	Leathes Johnston	Thomas Evans	Joseph Hudson	
7 May 1757	George Anne Cooke	Francis Boggest	Robert Tripp	George Bodens	Leathes Johnston	Thomas Evans	Robert Jackson	Richard Poley
13 May 1758	George Anne Cooke	Francis Boggest	William Wilkinson	George Bodens	Leathes Johnston	Thomas Evans	Robert Jackson	Richard Poley
9 July 1759	George Anne Cooke	Francis Boggest	William Wilkinson	George Bodens	Leathes Johnston	Thomas Evans	Robert Griffin	Richard Poley
9 May 1760	George Anne Cooke	John Fremantle	William Wilkinson	George Bodens	Leathes Johnston	Thomas Evans	Robert Griffin	Richard Poley
7 November 1761	George Anne Cooke	John Fremantle	Thomas Cox	George Bodens	Leathes Johnston	Thomas Evans	Robert Griffin	Richard Poley
24 November 1764	George Anne Cooke	John Fremantle	Frederick Chapman	George Bodens	Leathes Johnston	Thomas Evans	Robert Griffin	Richard Poley
5 February 1765	George Anne Cooke	John Fremantle	Frederick Chapman	George Bodens	Leathes Johnston	Thomas Evans	Edward Mainwaring	Richard Poley
15 June 1765	George Anne Cooke	John Fremantle	Frederick Chapman	George Bodens	William Plaxon	Thomas Evans	Edward Mainwaring	Richard Poley
21 May 1767	George Anne Cooke	John Fremantle	Frederick Chapman	George Bodens	William Plaxon	John Larpent	Edward Mainwaring	Richard Poley
8 February 1770	George Anne Cooke	John Fremantle	Frederick Chapman	George Bodens	William Plaxon	John Larpent	Edward Mainwaring	William Newton
22 January 1771	George Anne Cooke	John Fremantle	Frederick Chapman	George Bodens	William Plaxon	John Larpent	Edward Mainwaring	Francis Bartlam
23 July 1774	George Anne Cooke	John Fremantle	Frederick Chapman	George Bodens	William Plaxon	Edward Whitehouse	Edward Mainwaring	Francis Bartlam
5 September 1776	George Anne Cooke	John Fremantle	Frederick Chapman	George Bodens	William Plaxon	Edward Whitehouse	Edward Mainwaring	Henry Baines
8 February 1779	John Welsh	John Fremantle	Frederick Chapman	George Bodens	William Plaxon	Edward Whitehouse	Edward Mainwaring	Henry Baines
7 June 1779	John Welsh	John Fremantle	Frederick Chapman	Edmund Armstrong	William Plaxon	Edward Whitehouse	Edward Mainwaring	Henry Baines
20 April 1782	John Welsh	John Edward Fremantle	Frederick Chapman	Edmund Armstrong	William Plaxon	Edward Whitehouse	Edward Mainwaring	Henry Baines
17 October 1782	John Welsh	John Edward Fremantle	Frederick Chapman	Edmund Armstrong	Charles Moore	Edward Whitehouse	Edward Mainwaring	Henry Baines
5 December 1782	John Welsh	John Edward Fremantle	Frederick Chapman	Edmund Armstrong	Charles Moore	Edward Whitehouse	Edward Mainwaring	John Savile Dobyns
4 April 1783	John Welsh	John Edward Fremantle	Frederick Chapman	Edmund Armstrong	Charles Moore	Edward Whitehouse	James Meller	John Savile Dobyns
1788	John Welsh	John Edward Fremantle	Frederick Chapman	Edmund Armstrong	Robert Browne	Edward Whitehouse	James Meller	John Savile Dobyns
5 February 1794	John Welsh	John Edward Fremantle	Frederick Chapman	Robert Chester	Robert Browne	Edward Whitehouse	James Meller	John Savile Dobyns
6 February 1797	John Welsh	John Edward Fremantle	Frederick Chapman	Thomas Osmer	Robert Browne	Edward Whitehouse	James Meller	John Savile Dobyns
29 July 1798	John Welsh	John Edward Fremantle	Frederick Chapman	Thomas Osmer	Robert Browne	Edward Whitehouse	William Lewis	John Savile Dobyns
6 March 1801	Thomas Baucutt Mash	John Edward Fremantle	Frederick Chapman	Thomas Osmer	Robert Browne	Edward Whitehouse	William Lewis	John Savile Dobyns
27 July 1802	Thomas Baucutt Mash	John Edward Fremantle	Frederick Chapman	James Singer Burton	Robert Browne	Edward Whitehouse	William Lewis	John Savile Dobyns
22 March 1805	Thomas Baucutt Mash	Heneage Legge	Frederick Chapman	James Singer Burton	Robert Browne	Edward Whitehouse	William Lewis	John Savile Dobyns
20 March 1806	Thomas Baucutt Mash	Heneage Legge	Frederick Chapman	James Singer Burton	Robert Browne	John Bowdler	William Lewis	John Savile Dobyns
20 August 1808	Thomas Baucutt Mash	Heneage Legge	Edward Ash	James Singer Burton	Robert Browne	John Bowdler	William Lewis	John Savile Dobyns
2 February 1815	Thomas Baucutt Mash	Heneage Legge	Edward Ash	James Singer Burton	Robert Browne	William Barnard Clarke	William Lewis	John Savile Dobyns
6 January 1819	Thomas Baucutt Mash	Heneage Legge	Edward Ash	Samuel Randall	Robert Browne	William Barnard Clarke	William Lewis	John Savile Dobyns
4 March 1820	Henry Meynell	Heneage Legge	Edward Ash	Samuel Randall	Robert Browne	William Barnard Clarke	William Lewis	John Savile Dobyns
11 March 1829	Henry Meynell	Heneage Legge	Edward Ash	Samuel Randall	Robert Browne	William Barnard Clarke	William Lewis	William Martins
30 March 1829	Henry Meynell	Heneage Legge	Sir John Strachan, 10th Baronet	Samuel Randall	Robert Browne	William Barnard Clarke	William Lewis	William Martins
23 March 1831	Thomas Shiffner	Heneage Legge	Sir John Strachan, 10th Baronet	Samuel Randall	Robert Browne	William Barnard Clarke	William Lewis	William Martins
23 April 1833	Henry William Greville	Heneage Legge	Sir John Strachan, 10th Baronet	Samuel Randall	Robert Browne	William Barnard Clarke	William Lewis	William Martins
20 May 1833	Henry William Greville	Heneage Legge	Sir John Strachan, 10th Baronet	Samuel Randall	Robert Browne	John George Green	William Lewis	William Martins
4 April 1836	Henry William Greville	Heneage Legge	Sir John Strachan, 10th Baronet	Samuel Randall	John Lyster	John George Green	William Lewis	William Martins
21 October 1836	Henry William Greville	Heneage Legge	Sir John Strachan, 10th Baronet	Samuel Randall	William FitzGerald-de Ros	John George Green	William Lewis	William Martins
10 January 1837	Henry William Greville	Heneage Legge	Sir John Strachan, 10th Baronet	Samuel Randall	William FitzGerald-de Ros	John George Green	William Lewis	Charles Diggle
11 June 1838	Henry William Greville	Heneage Legge	Sir John Strachan, 10th Baronet	Samuel Randall	William FitzGerald-de Ros	John George Green	Alfred Montgomery	Charles Diggle
7 June 1839	Henry William Greville	Heneage Legge	Sir John Strachan, 10th Baronet	Samuel Randall	Edward Hobhouse	John George Green	Alfred Montgomery	Charles Diggle
27 December 1844	Henry William Greville	Mortimer Sackville-West	Sir John Strachan, 10th Baronet	Samuel Randall	Edward Hobhouse	John George Green	Alfred Montgomery	Charles Diggle
1 March 1852	Henry William Greville	Wilbraham Taylor	Sir John Strachan, 10th Baronet	Samuel Randall	Edward Hobhouse	John George Green	Alfred Montgomery	Charles Diggle
13 July 1852	Henry William Greville	Wilbraham Taylor	Sir John Strachan, 10th Baronet	Henry Sykes Stephens	Edward Hobhouse	John George Green	Alfred Montgomery	Charles Diggle
24 February 1854	Henry William Greville	Wilbraham Taylor	Robert Tench Bedford	Henry Sykes Stephens	Edward Hobhouse	John George Green	Alfred Montgomery	Charles Diggle
22 May 1854	Henry William Greville	Wilbraham Taylor	Robert Tench Bedford	Henry Sykes Stephens	George Howard Vyse	John George Green	Alfred Montgomery	Charles Diggle
26 June 1862	Henry William Greville	Wilbraham Taylor	Robert Tench Bedford	Henry Sykes Stephens	George Howard Vyse	William Ross	Alfred Montgomery	Charles Diggle
27 October 1862	Henry William Greville	Wilbraham Taylor	Robert Tench Bedford	Henry Sykes Stephens	George Howard Vyse	William Ross	Alfred Montgomery	Charles Gudgeon Nelson
9 March 1868	Henry William Greville	Wilbraham Taylor	Francis Knollys	Henry Sykes Stephens	George Howard Vyse	William Ross	Alfred Montgomery	Charles Gudgeon Nelson
1 March 1873	Raglan George Henry Somerset	Wilbraham Taylor	Francis Knollys	Henry Sykes Stephens	George Howard Vyse	William Ross	Alfred Montgomery	Charles Gudgeon Nelson
2 February 1874	Raglan George Henry Somerset	Wilbraham Taylor	Francis Knollys	Henry Sykes Stephens	George Howard Vyse	Charles Wylde	Alfred Montgomery	Charles Gudgeon Nelson
29 August 1878	Raglan George Henry Somerset	Wilbraham Taylor	Francis Knollys	Arthur John Loftus	George Howard Vyse	Charles Wylde	Alfred Montgomery	Charles Gudgeon Nelson
28 April 1883	Raglan George Henry Somerset	Wilbraham Taylor	Francis Knollys	Henry Julian Stonor	George Howard Vyse	Charles Wylde	Alfred Montgomery	Charles Gudgeon Nelson
21 January 1884	Raglan George Henry Somerset	Wilbraham Taylor	Francis Knollys	Henry Julian Stonor	George Howard Vyse	Aubrey FitzClarence	Alfred Montgomery	Charles Gudgeon Nelson
4 June 1890	Raglan George Henry Somerset	Wilbraham Taylor	Francis Knollys	Henry Julian Stonor	Charles James Innes Ker	Aubrey FitzClarence	Alfred Montgomery	Charles Gudgeon Nelson
1 May 1892	Raglan George Henry Somerset	Wilbraham Taylor	Francis Knollys	Henry Julian Stonor	Charles James Innes Ker	Aubrey FitzClarence	Alfred Montgomery	Arthur Collins
18 May 1895	Raglan George Henry Somerset	Brook Taylor	Francis Knollys	Henry Julian Stonor	Charles James Innes Ker	Aubrey FitzClarence	Alfred Montgomery	Arthur Collins
15 April 1896	Raglan George Henry Somerset	Brook Taylor	Francis Knollys	Henry Julian Stonor	Charles James Innes Ker	Aubrey FitzClarence	Arthur Hay	Arthur Collins
27 November 1899	Raglan George Henry Somerset	Brook Taylor	Wyndham Frederick Tufnell	Henry Julian Stonor	Charles James Innes Ker	Aubrey FitzClarence	Arthur Hay	Arthur Collins

=== Supernumerary ===
- 14 September 1664 – ?: John Mercer
- 10 March 1665 – ?: Samuell Price
- 23 March 1666 – ?: Francis Burghill
- 16 March 1669 – ?: William Batterlee
- 10 July 1671 – ?: Francis Harris
- 17 July 1671 – ?: George Sanderson
- 23 July 1673 – ?: Thomas Skarlett

=== In Extraordinary ===
- 14 July 1660 – ?: John Cleeland
- 21 December 1660 – ?: Thomas Webb
- 14 February 1661 – ?: William Wakerfield
- 6 May 1661 – 10 July 1671?: Francis Harris
- 14 May 1662 – ?: Samuell Norrice
- 2 July 1662 – ?: James Bridgman
- 30 August 1662 – ?: Charles Gouldsmyth
- 30 September 1662 – ?: Isaack Page
- 2 February 1663 – ?: William Mercer
- 27 February 1663 – ?: John Rowe
- 28 February 1663 – ?: Martin Trott
- 9 March 1663 – ?: John Taylor
- 2 April 1663 – ?: Nicholas Coleburne
- 3 April 1663 – ?: Anderson Achley
- 6 July 1663 – ?: John Colemore
- 29 July 1663 – ?: William Rattrey
- 10 December 1663 – ?: James Jenever
- 27 January 1664 – ?: Uriah Babbington
- 20 August 1664 – ?: John Boys
- 20 August 1664 – ?: John Backhouse
- 12 November 1664 – 23 July 1673?: Thomas Skarlett
- 6 February 1665 – ?: Joshua Meriton
- 24 June 1665 – ?: Edward Bedill
- 9 December 1665 – ?: Henry Pate
- 19 January 1666 – aft. 1680?: Robert Marriell
- 1 March 1666 – ?: Edmund Cowse
- 6 March 1666 – ?: Daniell Skymer
- 5 May 1718 – 9 November 1719: Charles Bodens
- 11 December 1719 – 7 August 1722: Robert Tripp
- 5 February 1861 – 5 January 1882: John George Green

== Extra Gentleman Ushers ==
Extra Gentleman Ushers gazetted without indicating them to be daily or quarterly waiters.

- 9 January 1850 – 1 March 1852: Wilbraham Taylor
- 5 April 1855 – ?: Norman Hilton Macdonald
- 8 December 1857 – 1 February 1859: Sir Spencer Ponsonby-Fane
- 13 July 1892 – 1901?: Alexander Nelson Hood
- 1 January 1899 – 27 November 1899: Wyndham Frederick Tufnell

== Lady & Gentleman Ushers (post-1901) ==
=== In Ordinary ===
- 23 July 1901 – 1 December 1915?: Sir Spencer Ponsonby-Fane
- 23 July 1901 – 16 September 1925: Arthur Hay
- 23 July 1901 – 11 February 1911: Otway Frederick Seymour Cuffe
- 23 July 1901 – 7 February 1902: Aubrey FitzClarence
- 23 July 1901 – 1935?: Henry Julian Stonor
- 23 July 1901 – 26 January 1909: John Palmer Brabazon
- 23 July 1901 – 21 November 1911: Arthur Collins
- 23 July 1901 – 1 February 1928: Sir Lionel Cust
- 23 July 1901 – 30 November 1908: Montague Charles Eliot
- 23 July 1901 – 1 April 1919: Sir David Erskine
- 23 July 1901 – 14 November 1905: Charles James Innes-Ker
- 23 July 1901 – 7 May 1910?: Cuthbert Larking (not renewed 7 May 1910)
- 23 July 1901 – bef. 1919: Arnold Royle
- 23 July 1901 – 13 June 1903: John Ramsay Slade
- 23 July 1901 – 14 June 1908: Walter James Stopford
- 23 July 1901 – 1 April 1919: Brook Taylor
- 23 July 1901 – 24 June 1925: Horace Charles George West
- 7 February 1902 – 14 November 1905: Arthur Henry John Walsh (replacing FitzClarence)
- 13 June 1903 – 2 May 1927: Percy Armytage (replacing Slade)
- 14 November 1905 – 1913: Sir John Ramsay Slade (replacing Innes-Ker)
- 14 November 1905 – 18 July 1907?: Harry Lloyd-Verney (replacing Walsh)
- 18 July 1907 – 20 May 1916: Charles Windham (replacing Verney, who res. by 1 August 1907)
- 26 June 1908 – 13 October 1908: Charles Elphinstone Fleeming Cunninghame Graham (replacing Stopford)
- 13 October 1908 – 1 April 1919: Thomas Arthur Fitzhardinge Kingscote (replacing Graham)
- 30 November 1908 – 1 April 1919: Gerald Montagu Augustus Ellis (replacing Eliot)
- 26 January 1909 – 1 April 1919: Henry Fludyer (replacing Brabazon)
- 17 June 1910 – 2 January 1911: Seymour John Fortescue (replacing Larking?)
- 2 January 1911 – 21 July 1936: Montague Charles Eliot (replacing Fortescue)
- 11 February 1911 – 3 November 1924: Lord William Cecil (replacing Cuffe)
- 13 February 1912 – 15 February 1927: John Chaytor Brinton (replacing Collins)
- 30 September 1913 – 1914: William Leslie Davidson (replacing Slade)
- 1 April 1919 – 21 July 1936: Philip Nelson-Ward (replacing Erskine)
- 1 April 1919 – 4 May 1922: Charles Dormer, 14th Baron Dormer (replacing Royle)
- 1 April 1919 – 14 October 1932: Edmund Moore Cooper Cooper-Key
- 1 April 1919 – bef. 1936: Gerald Trotter (replacing Kingscote)
- 1 April 1919 – 22 April 1927: Montagu Grant Wilkinson (replacing Ellis)
- 1 April 1919 – 1 December 1931: Berkeley John Talbot Levett (replacing Fludyer)
- 1 April 1919 – 24 October 1928: Henry Peter Hansell (replacing Davidson)
- 6 June 1922 – 21 May 1934: Sir Hamnet Share (replacing Dormer)
- 1 March 1924 – 21 July 1936: Louis Leisler Greig
- 24 June 1925 – 13 February 1950?: Edmund Vivian Gabriel (replacing West)
- 16 September 1925 – 19 April 1966: Sir Humphrey Clifford Lloyd (replacing Hay)
- 15 February 1927 – 21 February 1964: Henry Valentine Bache de Satgé (replacing Brinton)
- 22 April 1927 – 21 July 1936: Sir Smith Hill Child, 2nd Baronet (replacing Wilkinson)
- 2 May 1927 – 12 January 1961: Sir Arthur Bromley, 8th Baronet (replacing Armytage)
- 1 February 1928 – 2 March 1937?: George Sidney Herbert (replacing Cust)
- 24 October 1928 – 21 July 1936: Sir Arthur Bannerman, 12th Baronet (replacing Hansell)
- 1 December 1931 – 7 May 1946: John Coldbrook Hanbury-Williams (replacing Levett)
- 14 October 1932 – 21 November 1939: John Lamplugh Wickham (replacing Cooper-Key)
- 21 May 1934 – 1 January 1952: Frederick Edward Packe (replacing Share)
- 21 July 1936 – 5 August 1952: Charles Alexander Lindsay Irvine
- 1 March 1937 – 5 August 1952?: Russell Lister-Kaye
- 1 March 1937 – 3 August 1951: Neville Tufnell
- 1 March 1937 – 1 January 1967: Geoffrey Ronald Codrington
- 1 March 1937 – 17 January 1964: William Duncan Phipps
- 1 March 1937 – 1 September 1954: Sir Frank Todd Spickernell
- 1 March 1937 – 1 January 1967: Philip Lloyd Neville
- 1 March 1937 – 1 December 1938: John Spencer Coke
- 1 December 1938 – 3 September 1955?: Guy Elland Carne Rasch (replacing Coke)
- 1 January 1952 – 10 November 1959: Sir George Ranald Macfarlane Reid (replacing Packe)
- 14 November 1952 – 1 July 1969: Sir John Mandeville Hugo
- 8 May 1953 – 1 April 1967: John Sidney North FitzGerald
- bef. 1959: Frederick Robert Joseph Mack
- 10 November 1959 – 1 April 1967: Frederick Beaumont-Nesbitt (replacing Mack)
- 10 November 1959 – 18 January 1966: Arthur Ledger (replacing Reid)
- 9 May 1961 – 22 February 1995: Carron Greig
- 27 October 1964 – 25 July 1969: Richard Frank Sherlock Gooch
- 16 March 1965 – 28 January 1984: Michael Neville Tufnell
- 1 November 1966 – 9 June 1975: Sir James Newton Rodney Moore
- 1 November 1966 – 12 August 1979: Sir Maurice Heath
- 1 January 1967 – ?: John Arundell Holdsworth (replacing Codrington)
- 1 January 1967 – ?: William Henry Gerard Leigh (replacing Neville)
- 1 April 1967 – 1979: Sir Ronald Brockman (replacing FitzGerald)
- 3 October 1967 – 1979: Peter Vanneck
- 29 March 1971 – 12 July 1991: Sir Julian Paget, 4th Baronet
- ? – 20 April 1976: Sir James Bowes-Lyon
- 17 February 1978 – 20 October 1989: Sir Neville Stack
- 21 November 1978 – 14 August 1995: John Arthur Guinness Slessor
- 1 October 1979 – 1 October 1982: Sir David Williams
- ? 1979 – ? 1997: Major Nigel Chamberlayne-Macdonald
- ? – 1 January 1980: Sir Peter Gillett
- 1 January 1980 – 1 December 1989: Sir Desmond Hind Garrett Rice (replacing Gillett)
- 2 November 1982 – 28 June 1994: Sir Roy Austen-Smith
- 2 November 1982 – 24 July 1994: Sir David Loram
- 1984 – 2002: Captain Michael Ernest Barrow
- 5 November 1985 – 3 October 1999: Captain Michael Fulford-Dobson
- 28 February 1986 – 20 August 1998: Sir Richard Vickers
- 20 October 1989 – 31 January 2001: Barry Hamilton Newton (replacing Stack)
- 12 July 1991 – 17 June 2004: Henry Malcolm Chitty Havergal
- 28 June 1994 – 2009: Colin Herbert Dickinson Cooke-Priest (replacing Austen-Smith)
- 10 November 1994 – 4 April 2007: Air Vice-Marshal David Hawkins, later Hawkins-Leth (replacing Loram)
- 22 February 1995 – 1 January 2008: Major General Brian Pennicott
- 14 August 1995 -31 January 2011: Group Captain Hugh Rolfe (replacing Slessor)
- 1997 – 15 January 2017: Lieutenant Colonel Gordon Thomas Riddell Birdwood (d. 15 January 2017)
- 20 August 1998 – 29 July 1999: Robert Cartwright (replacing Vickers)
- 29 July 1999 – 5 July 2016: Lieutenant Colonel Oliver Breakwell (replacing Cartwright)
- 3 October 1999 – 31 July 2011: Captain Paddy McKnight (replacing Fulford-Dobson)
- 2002 – 30 April 2013: Air Vice-Marshal Richard Henry Kyle (Replacing Newton)
- 2002 – 31 December 2015: Commodore John Hance(replacing Barrow)
- 17 June 2004 – 31 March 2015: Major General George Kennedy (replacing Havergal)
- 4 April 2007 – 22 April 2022: Air Vice-Marshal David Anthony Hobart (replacing David Hawkins-Leth)
- 1 January 2008 – 19 December 2023: Major Grant Baker (replacing Pennicott)
- 1 August 2009 – 5 December 2017: Commodore Laurie Hopkins (replacing Cooke-Priest)
- 1 February 2011 – 22 April 2022: Air Commodore Malcolm Fuller (replacing Rolfe)
- 1 August 2011 – 5 April 2024: Commodore Christopher Laurence Palmer (replacing McKnight)
- 4 January 2013 – 5 December 2023: Air Vice Marshal Richard Lacey (replacing Kyle)
- 31 March 2015 – 26 August 2024: Lieutenant Colonel Sir Alexander Matheson of Matheson Bt (replacing Kennedy)
- 1 January 2016 – 26 August 2024: Commodore Jonathan Handley (replacing Hance)
- 6 July 2016 – 15 July 2025: Major General Matthew Sykes (replacing Breakwell)
- 4 May 2017 – present: Brigadier Jonathan Bourne-May (replacing Birdwood)
- 6 December 2017 – present: Captain David Lilley (replacing Hopkins)
- 1 October 2021 – present: Air Vice-Marshal Elaine West (replacing Fuller)
- 1 October 2021 – present: Air Vice-Marshal David Murray (replacing Hobart)
- 6 December 2023 – present: Colonel Susan Wright (replacing Lacey)
- 1 January 2024 – present: Colonel Jeremy Bagshaw (replacing Baker)
- 6 April 2024 – present: Air Vice-Marshal Gary Waterfall (replacing Palmer)
- 27 August 2024 – present: Air Commodore Catherine Coton (replacing Matheson)
- 15 July 2025 – present: Commodore Stuart Wright (replacing Sykes)

=== Extra ===
- 1 April 1919 – bef. 1936: Brook Taylor
- 1 April 1919 – 1935?: Thomas Arthur Fitzhardinge Kingscote
- 1 April 1919 – aft. 1937: Gerald Montagu Augustus Ellis (d. 1953)
- 1 April 1919 – 1920: Henry Fludyer
- 3 November 1924 – 1937: Lord William Cecil
- 16 September 1925 – bef. 1936: Arthur Hay
- 22 April 1927 – aft. 1937: Montagu Grant Wilkinson
- 2 May 1927 – bef. 1936: Percy Armytage
- 1 February 1928 – 12 October 1929?: Sir Lionel Cust
- 24 October 1928 – bef. 1936: Henry Peter Hansell
- 1 December 1931 – aft. 1937: Berkeley John Talbot Levett
- 14 October 1932 – bef. 1936: Edmund Moore Cooper Cooper-Key
- 21 May 1934 – 1937: Sir Hamnet Holditch Share
- 21 July 1936 – bef. 1952: Philip Nelson-Ward
- 21 July 1936 – 27 April 1955: Sir Arthur Bannerman, 12th Baronet
- 1 March 1937 – 1 March 1953: Louis Leisler Greig
- 1 December 1938 – aft. 1952: John Spencer Coke
- 21 November 1939 – bef. 1952: John Lamplugh Wickham
- 7 May 1946 – aft. 1952: Sir John Coldbrook Hanbury-Williams
- 1 August 1950 – aft. 1952: Sir John Berkeley Monck
- 8 December 1950 – aft. 1952: Sir Algar Howard
- 2 March 1951 – aft. 1952: Andrew Vavasour Scott Yates
- 2 March 1951 – aft. 1952: Thomas Cockayne Harvey
- 1 January 1952 – aft. 1952: Frederick Edward Packe
- 5 August 1952 – aft. 1952: Charles Alexander Lindsay Irvine
- 1 September 1954 – ?: Sir Frank Todd Spickernell
- 24 May 1955 – ?: Ernest Frederick Orby Gascoigne
- 24 May 1955 – ?: Charles Richard Britten
- 8 November 1955 – 11 September 1964: Frederic Hudd
- 8 November 1955 – 29 March 1957: Valston Hancock
- 8 November 1955 – 6 June 1958: John Graham Hale
- 8 November 1955 – 23 April 1957: Shaukat Ali Shah
- 8 November 1955 – 1 April 1960: Christopher Fernando
- 29 March 1957 – 14 October 1958: Edmund John Buchanan Foxcroft (replacing Hancock)
- 23 April 1957 – 6 January 1961: Sultan Mohammed (replacing Shah)
- 24 May 1957 – 1961: Sir Marcus Cheke
- 6 June 1958 – 27 April 1962: John Vivian Scott (replacing Hale)
- 2 August 1958 – 9 July 1966: Sir John Dashwood, 10th Baronet
- 14 October 1958 – 5 January 1960: Robert William Knights (replacing Foxcroft)
- 10 November 1959 – 1991?: Sir George Ranald Macfarlane Reid
- 10 November 1959 – ?: Esmond Butler
- 5 January 1960 – 1960: Robert Durie (replacing Knights) (d. 1960)
- 1 April 1960 – ?: Mirisiya Ananda Jeewasoma (replacing Fernando)
- 27 May 1960 – 6 March 1962: Alister Murray Murdoch (replacing Durie)
- 6 January 1961 – ?: Irshad Ahmad Khan (replacing Mohammed)
- 24 January 1961 – 27 December 1970: Brigadier Sir Ivan de la Bere
- 14 November 1961 – ?: Sir Henry Austin Strutt
- 6 March 1962 – 30 September 1966: William Richard Cumming
- 27 April 1962 – 13 March 1964: Donald Geoffrey Harper (replacing Scott)
- 12 June 1962 – 27 October 1964: Richard Frank Sherlock Gooch
- 21 February 1964 – 1964: Henry Valentine Bache de Satgé
- 13 March 1964 – 23 March 1965: John Malcolm Kirk Hill (replacing Harper)
- 21 April 1964 – ?: Geoffrey Clark Hartnell
- 11 September 1964 – 22 October 1965: Alain Chartier Edmond Joly de Lotbinière (replacing Hudd)
- 23 March 1965 – 21 March 1967: Jeremy Paul Axford Commons (replacing Hill)
- 22 October 1965 – 23 August 1966: Michel de Goumois (replacing de Lotbinière)
- 18 January 1966 – ?: Arthur Ledger
- 19 April 1966 – ?: Sir Humphrey Clifford Lloyd
- 23 August 1966 – ?: Jacques Claude Noiseux (replacing de Goumois)
- 30 September 1966 – 2 February 1968: Francis George Hassett (replacing Cumming)
- 1 January 1967 – ?: Geoffrey Ronald Codrington
- 1 January 1967 – ?: Philip Lloyd Neville
- 21 March 1967 – 31 July 1970: Bruce Walter Middleton (replacing Commons)
- 1 April 1967 – ?: John Sidney North FitzGerald
- 1 April 1967 – ?: Frederick George Beaumont-Nesbitt
- 2 February 1968 – 17 November 1970: Andrew Leslie Moore (replacing Hassett)
- 20 August 1968 – ?: Sir Cyril Colquhoun
- 1 July 1969 – 2000: Sir John Mandeville Hugo
- 25 July 1969 – 6 June 1973: Richard Frank Sherlock Gooch
- 25 November 1969 – 6 February 1975: Sir John Wilson, 2nd Baronet
- 31 July 1970 – ?: Nicholas William Bridge (replacing Middleton)
- 17 November 1970 – 5 June 1971: Air Vice-Marshal Frank Headlam (replacing Moore)
- 5 June 1971 – 1 November 1974: William Richard Cumming (replacing Headlam)
- 1 November 1974 – 1 December 1977: John Wilkins Hubble (replacing Cumming)
- 9 June 1975 – 1985: Sir Rodney Moore
- 20 April 1976 – 1977: Sir James Bowes-Lyon
- 1 December 1977 – 30 June 1981: Francis Conynghame Murray (replacing Hubble)
- 12 August 1979 – 9 July 1988: Sir Maurice Lionel Heath
- 30 June 1981 – 3 August 1982: Richard Malcolm Baird (replacing Murray)
- 30 June 1981 – 26 July 2010: Sir James Henry Scholtens
- 30 June 1981 – 2010: Sir Patrick Jerad O'Dea
- 30 June 1981 – ?: Percy Stewart Cooper
- 3 August 1982 – ?: Robert John Whitten (replacing Baird)
- 1 October 1982 – 16 July 2012: Sir David Williams
- 28 January 1984 – ?: Michael Neville Tufnell
- 1984 – ?: Henry Francis Davis
- 2 December 1986 – 2009: Sir Russell Dillon Wood
- 25 June 1985 – 5 February 1988: Captain Peter Volney Blackman
- 5 February 1988 – ?: David Robert Lawrence (replacing Blackman)
- 20 October 1989 – January 1994: Sir Neville Stack
- 1 December 1989 – 14 July 2020: Sir Desmond Hind Garrett Rice
- 12 July 1991 – 25 September 2016: Sir Julian Paget, 4th Baronet
- 1 January 1993 – present: Stanley William Frederick Martin
- 1 October 1993 – ?: John Haslam
- 1 December 1993 – 7 September 2006: Sir Norman Blacklock
- 28 June 1994 – 27 March 2021: Sir Roy Austen-Smith
- 24 July 1994 – 30 June 2011: Sir David Loram
- 22 February 1995 – 11 July 2012: Sir Henry Louis Carron Greig
- 14 August 1995 – 11 March 2008: Group Captain John Arthur Guinness Slessor
- ? 1997 - 15 August 2013: Major Nigel Chamberlayne-Macdonald
- 20 August 1998 - 5 February 2024: Sir Richard Maurice Hilton Vickers
- 1999 – present: Captain Michael Fulford-Dobson
- 2002 – 2013: Captain Michael Ernest Barrow Royal Navy
- 1 February 2002 – 25 August 2020: Air Vice Marshal Barry Hamilton Newton
- 17 June 2004 – 20 June 2025: Colonel Henry Malcolm Chitty Havergal
- 4 April 2007 – 31 January 2019: Air Vice Marshal David Hawkins-Leth
- 13 November 2007 – present: Surgeon Captain David Swain
- 1 January 2008 – 18 June 2025: Major General Brian Pennicott
- 1 August 2009 – 6 April 2020: Rear Admiral Colin Herbert Dickinson Cooke-Priest
- 1 February 2011 – present: Group Captain Hugh Rolfe
- 1 August 2011 – present: Captain Paddy McKnight Royal Navy
- 4 January 2013 – present: Air Vice Marshal Richard Kyle
- 1 April 2015 – present: Major General George Kennedy
- 1 January 2016 – present: Commodore John Hance Royal Navy
- 7 July 2016 – 25 May 2021: Lieutenant Colonel Oliver Breakwell
- 5 December 2017 – 6 June 2024: Commodore Laurie Hopkins Royal Navy
- 22 April 2022 – present: Air Commodore Malcolm Fuller
- 22 April 2022 – present: Air Vice Marshal David Hobart
- 1 February 2024 – present: Air Vice Marshal Richard Lacey
- 1 February 2024 – present: Major Grant Baker
- 6 April 2024 – present: Commodore Christopher Laurence Palmer Royal Navy
- 27 August 2024 – present: Lieutenant Colonel Sir Alexander Matheson of Matheson Bt
- 15 July 2025 – present: Major General Matthew Sykes

=== Honorary ===
- 9 July 1903 – 13 October 1908: Thomas Arthur Fitzhardinge Kingscote
- 11 June 1909 – 11 February 1911: Lord William Cecil
