= 1974 New Zealand Royal Visit Honours =

Awards list for New Zealand

1974 Royal Visit Honours
- Previous: 1974 New Year Honours; Next: 1974 bravery awards
- Type: New Zealand royal honours: Royal Victorian Order
- Date: 29 January – 8 February 1974
- Country: New Zealand
- Total recipients: 18

The 1974 New Zealand Royal Visit Honours were appointments by Elizabeth II to the Royal Victorian Order, to mark her visit to New Zealand that year. The Queen was accompanied by Prince Philip, Duke of Edinburgh, the Prince of Wales (now Charles III), Anne, Princess Royal and Mark Phillips on the tour, and attended the 10th British Commonwealth Games in Christchurch and celebrations at Waitangi to mark New Zealand Day. The honours were announced during the tour on 29 January, and 7 and 8 February 1974.

The recipients of honours are listed here as they were styled before their new honour.

== Royal Victorian Order ==
=== Knight Grand Cross (GCVO) ===
- Sir Denis Blundell GCMG KBE – governor-general of New Zealand
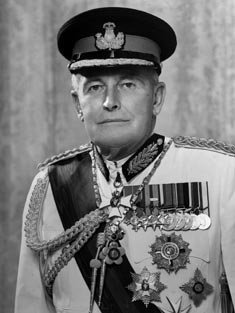
Sir Denis Blundell

=== Knight Commander (KCVO) ===
- Patrick Jerad O'Dea CVO

=== Commander (CVO) ===
- Bryan David Crompton MVO

=== Member, fourth class (MVO) ===
- Desmond James Cummings MVO
- Lieutenant-Colonel Michael John Dudman – Royal New Zealand Infantry Regiment
- James Joseph Warnell Little
- Donald Francis Ross
- Robert Samuel Straight
- Lieutenant Kevin Frederick Wilson RNZN
- Francis Eamonn Wilson MVO

In 1984, Members of the Royal Victorian Order, fourth class, were redesignated as Lieutenants of the Royal Victorian Order (LVO).

=== Member, fifth class (MVO) ===
- Andrew George Berriman – superintendent, New Zealand Police Force
- Richard Butler
- Donald Claude Gordon
- Christine Ann Major
- Katherine Maclean Wood

== Royal Victorian Medal ==
=== Silver (RVM) ===
- Raymond George Hawthorn
- Arthur Trevor Humphrey Broughton
- Sergeant Peter Forbes Orr – New Zealand Police Force
