= R72 =

R72 may refer to:

- R72 (South Africa), a road
- R72, the service on the Aigle–Ollon–Monthey–Champéry railway line
- HMS Wizard (R72), a destroyer of the Royal Navy
- R-72 Fürstenfeldbruck, a former United States Army Air Corps airfield in Germany
- Small nucleolar RNA R72
