= Platinum Jubilee Act of Loyalty Parade =

June 2022 military parade in Edinburgh, Scotland

The Platinum Jubilee Act of Loyalty Parade was a military parade held at the Palace of Holyroodhouse in Edinburgh, Scotland on 28 June 2022, organised as part of the Queen's Platinum Jubilee celebrations. Performed as a tribute to the Queen as Head of the British Armed Forces, on behalf of all three branches of the British Armed Forces, it featured all three services, with each of the single service Senior Representatives in Scotland present, together with Service Cadets.

The Act of Loyalty also marked the 200th anniversary of King George IV's visit to Scotland in 1822, known as the "King's Jaunt", which included General Sir Robert Abercromby, the then Governor of Edinburgh Castle, presenting the castle key to the Sovereign for the first time.

== The ceremony ==
The Armed Forces conducted a parade and Presentation of the Key for Edinburgh Castle in the gardens of the Palace of Holyroodhouse. A Royal Salute took place as the Queen arrived in the gardens via the Equerry's Door. Lord Lyon King of Arms then presented three Senior Representatives from the Royal Navy, Army and Royal Air Force in Scotland to the Queen. Three cadets, also representing each Service, then paraded the key to Edinburgh Castle across the gardens, which was received by Major General Alastair Bruce of Crionaich, Governor of Edinburgh Castle.

The Governor, assisted by three Service Cadets, then proceeded to the Equerry's Door and presented key to the Queen, saying:

"We, representatives of all ranks in the Armed Forces serving in Scotland, bound by our Oath to serve Your Majesty, your heirs and successors, and marking the 200th anniversary of the presentation of the key to George IV in 1822 and this 70th anniversary of Your reign, I offer this key for your acceptance to your Royal Fortress of Edinburgh Castle."

The Queen returned the key and said:

"I return the key to the safekeeping of My Governor of Edinburgh Castle, in gratitude for the symbolic Act of Loyalty of Our Armed Forces, confident of your faithful allegiance to your oath."

Three cheers for the Queen were then given by members of the Armed Forces before a pipe tune composed for the Platinum Jubilee called Diu Regnare was played, as she returned to the palace.

On completion of the parade, the ceremonial troops dispersed and the Key to Edinburgh Castle was returned to lie in the Great Hall. A new marker was added to the Chain to the Key representing its formal presentation to the Sovereign.

== Music ==
Musical support was provided by the Band of the Royal Marines Scotland and the Pipes and Drums of The Royal Regiment of Scotland.

== See also ==
- Diamond Jubilee Armed Forces Parade and Muster
