= David Murray (RAF officer) =

Retired senior Royal Air Force officer

Air Vice-Marshal The Honourable David Murray CVO OBE DL
- Born: 1960 (age 65–66)
- Relatives: Len Murray, Baron Murray of Epping Forest (father)
- Military career
- Allegiance: United Kingdom
- Branch: Royal Air Force
- Service years: 1980–2013
- Rank: Air Vice-Marshal
- Service number: 8023715
- Commands: Defence College of Police and Personnel Administration; RAF Halton
- Conflicts: Bosnia; Sierra Leone Civil War
- Awards: Commander of the Royal Victorian Order; Officer of the Order of the British Empire

Air Vice-Marshal David Paul Murray, CVO, OBE, DL (born 1960) is a retired senior Royal Air Force officer. He served as Defence Services Secretary in the Royal Household from 2010 to 2012. He is currently a member of the Veterans Advisory Board and a Vice Lord Lieutenant for the County of Suffolk.

== Military career ==
The son of Baron Murray of Epping Forest, the former TUC General Secretary Len Murray, Murray was commissioned into the Royal Air Force on 27 March 1980 in the rank of acting pilot officer. He was promoted to pilot officer on 27 September, and to flying officer on 5 July 1982. Murray served as station commander RAF Halton and then at Worthy Down Camp before becoming garrison commander at Winchester and then commandant of the Defence College of Police and Personnel Administration. Murray served on operational tours in the Falkland Islands, on UN peace-keeping duties in Bosnia and Sierra Leone. He also served in Africa, Australia, Cyprus and Germany. He became assistant chief of staff training in the RAF in 2006 and head of Ministry of Defence Personnel Strategy and Programmes in 2009 before he was promoted to air vice marshal in 2010 and appointed as Defence Services Secretary and Assistant Chief of the Defence Staff (Personnel). Murray led the Diamond Jubilee Armed Forces Parade and Muster in 2012.

Having been appointed a Member of the Order of the British Empire in the 1996 New Year Honours and an Officer of the Order of the British Empire in the 1999 Birthday Honours, Murray was invested as a Commander of the Royal Victorian Order (CVO) for his services as Defence Services Secretary in October 2012. He officially retired from the Royal Air Force on 21 January 2013.

== Later life ==
In October 2012, Murray became chief executive of national Armed Forces charity SSAFA.

As chief executive of SSAFA, Murray led an organisation with an annual turnover of more than £55m, 900 paid staff (mainly medical professionals and social workers) and over 7500 volunteers, providing practical support and assistance to more than 50,000 people each year, from D-Day veterans to young soldiers wounded in Afghanistan.

In September 2016, Murray was appointed controller/chief executive of the RAF Benevolent Fund. Founded in 1919, the RAF Benevolent Fund is the RAF's leading welfare charity supporting serving and former members of the RAF as well as their families. Annually, the charity spends over £18m supporting more than 41,000 members of the RAF family. Murray stepped down from the RAF Benevolent Fund in April 2020, succeeded by Air Vice Marshal Chris Elliot.

In October 2020, Murray was appointed to the Veterans Advisory Board. In February 2021 he was named a Deputy Lieutenant for the County of Suffolk, and in August 2026 he was appointed Vice Lord-Lieutenant of Suffolk until 31 December 2029.

In September 2021, Murray was appointed to the Royal Household as a Gentleman Usher.

Military offices
Preceded by Matthew Sykes	Defence Services Secretary; 2010–2012	Succeeded by Simon Williams
