= General Sykes =

General Sykes may refer to:

- Frederick Sykes (1877–1954), Royal Air Force major general
- George Sykes (1822–1880), Union Army major general
- Matthew Sykes (born 1955), British Army major general
- Percy Sykes (1867–1945), British Indian Army brigadier general
