= James Jungius =

Royal Navy Admiral (1923–2020)

Vice-Admiral Sir James Jungius KBE DL
- Born: 15 November 1923
- Died: 14 October 2020 (aged 96)
- Military career
- Allegiance: United Kingdom
- Branch: Royal Navy
- Service years: 1943–1980
- Rank: Vice-Admiral
- Commands: HMS Wizard; HMS Albion
- Conflicts: World War II: Operation Devon; Suez Crisis
- Awards: Knight Commander of the Order of the British Empire; Mentioned in dispatches

Vice-Admiral Sir James George Jungius KBE DL (15 November 1923 – 14 October 2020) was a Royal Navy officer who became Deputy Supreme Allied Commander Atlantic.

== Naval career ==
Educated at the Royal Naval College, Dartmouth, Jungius was commissioned a sub-lieutenant on 1 February 1943. He served in the Royal Navy during World War II and took part on commando operations in the Adriatic Sea. During the Italian Campaign, he took part in the capture of Termoli in Operation Devon, for which he was mentioned in dispatches.

He was promoted to lieutenant-commander on 1 December 1951, and to commander on 31 December 1955. He took command of the destroyer HMS Wizard during the Suez Crisis in 1956. Promoted to captain on 30 June 1963, he was appointed Assistant Naval attaché in Washington D. C. in 1968 and Captain of the aircraft carrier HMS Albion in 1971.

Jungius was promoted to rear admiral on 7 July 1972 and appointed Assistant Chief of the Naval Staff (Operational Requirements) the same year. He was promoted to vice-admiral on 8 September 1974, and was appointed Deputy Supreme Allied Commander Atlantic from January 1975. He was knighted as a Knight Commander of the Order of the British Empire (KBE) in the 1977 New Year Honours, and was appointed the Supreme Allied Commander Atlantic's Representative in Europe in 1978. He retired on 21 April 1980.

In retirement he became Deputy Lieutenant of Cornwall.

He died on 14 October 2020 at the age of 96.

== Family ==
In 1949, he married Rosemary Frances Turquand Matthey: they have three sons. Lady Jungius died in 2005.

Military offices
Preceded by Sir Gerard Mansfield	Deputy Supreme Allied Commander Atlantic; 1975–1977	Succeeded by Sir David Loram
