= David Loram =

Roual Navy Vice-Admiral (1924-2011)

Vice-Admiral Sir David Loram KCB CVO
- Born: 24 July 1924; London, England
- Died: 30 June 2011 (aged 86)
- Military career
- Allegiance: United Kingdom
- Branch: Royal Navy
- Rank: Vice-Admiral
- Commands: National Defence College
- Conflicts: World War II
- Awards: Knight Commander of the Order of the Bath; Commander of the Royal Victorian Order

Vice-Admiral Sir David Anning Loram KCB CVO (24 July 1924 – 30 June 2011) was a Royal Navy officer who became Deputy Supreme Allied Commander Atlantic.

== Naval career ==
Educated at the Royal Naval College, Dartmouth, Loram served in the Royal Navy during World War II and was involved as a junior officer in Operation Tungsten, the action against the German battleship Tirpitz in April 1944. He was also the officer who fired the torpedo which in 1942 scuttled the cruiser HMS Edinburgh, the Royal Navy ship carrying five tons of Russian gold. He was appointed Aide-de-Camp to the Governor-General of New Zealand in 1946 and Equerry to the Queen in 1954. He was appointed Director of Naval Operations and Trade under the Ministry of Defence Naval Staff from May 1970 to March 1971. He went on to be Flag Officer, Malta in 1973, Commandant of the National Defence College in 1975 and Deputy Supreme Allied Commander Atlantic in 1977 before retiring in 1980.

In retirement he became a Gentleman Usher to the Queen.

== Family ==
In 1958 he married Fiona Beloe; they had three sons. Following the dissolution of his first marriage he married Diana Keigwin. That marriage was also subsequently dissolved and he married third Sara Stead-Ellis, who survives him.

Military offices
Preceded by John Templeton-Cotill	Flag Officer, Malta; 1973–1975	Succeeded by Nigel Cecil
Preceded by Sir James Jungius	Deputy Supreme Allied Commander Atlantic; 1977–1980	Succeeded by Sir Cameron Rusby
