= Diamond Jubilee Armed Forces Parade and Muster =

2012 event in England

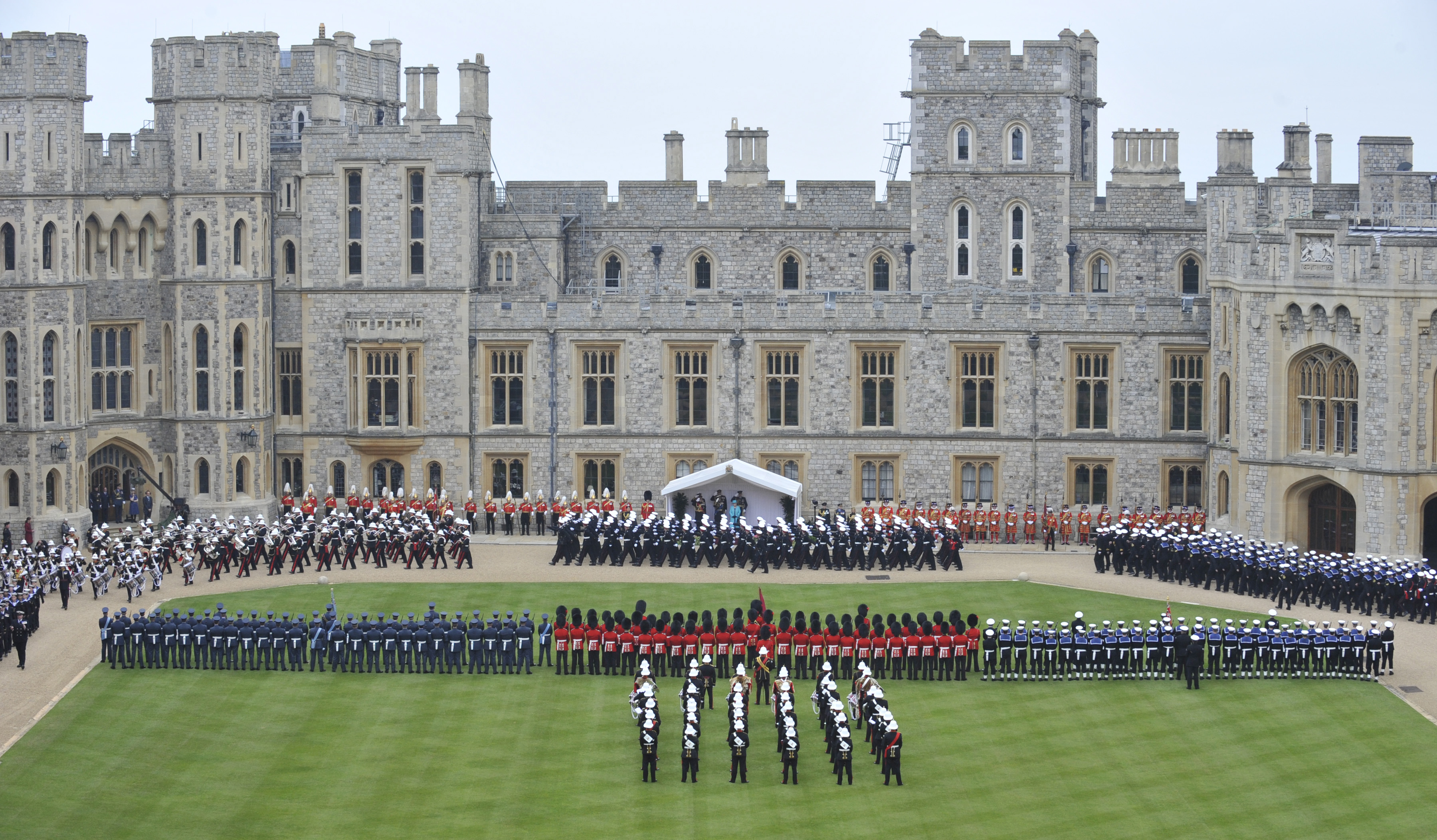
Sailors of the Royal Navy and marines of the Royal Marines, pass in review in front of Queen Elizabeth II as troops from all three services form on parade during the Diamond Jubilee Parade and Muster.

The Diamond Jubilee Armed Forces Parade and Muster was a military parade held at Windsor Castle and Home Park in Windsor, Berkshire, England, organised as part of the Queen Elizabeth II's Diamond Jubilee celebrations. Performed as a tribute to the Queen on behalf of all three branches of the British Armed Forces, it featured a review of members of all three services by the monarch (known as a muster), a military parade through the town, and flypasts by current and historic military aircraft.

== Background ==
The event followed the long-standing tradition of having an armed forces tribute to the monarch during a jubilee year, although this event was the first time all three services, the Royal Navy, the British Army, and the Royal Air Force, had visited Elizabeth II for such an event at the same time.

According to military historian Peter Craddick-Adams, a muster is an opportunity to show the monarch what they do and what they look like at a point in history, dating back to reviews of the preparedness of local militia in Tudor times. He ascribed an extra significance to this event as a thank you from the monarch to the military for their recent combat missions, given the actions in Afghanistan, Iraq and Libya.

== Preparation and organisation ==
In charge of the event was Air Vice-Marshal David Murray. Planning for it began 18 months beforehand, after the Queen accepted the request for a muster to be brought to her for the first time. With the venue chosen, 2,500 servicemen and women were selected to take part in the parade, including personnel who had recently served in the NATO operation in Afghanistan and on board HMS Liverpool during the Libyan Civil War.

With a high standard of drill required for the event, refresher training for the participants began two weeks beforehand. Massed personnel of the Navy prepared at Longmoor Training Camp, Hampshire, while the RAF practiced at RAF Halton. The guard of honour practiced at Wellington Barracks in London.

== Date, location and ceremony order ==
The Armed Forces Diamond Jubilee Parade and Muster took place on Saturday, 19 May 2012. It was the first major national event of the Diamond Jubilee celebrations for Queen Elizabeth II taking place in 2012. It preceded the programme of Spring & Summer celebrations in the UK which will culminate in an extended bank holiday weekend in June.

The event started inside Windsor Castle and ending in the private grounds of Home Park, part of the royal Windsor estate. It was opened with an initial flypast of Typhoon aircraft, followed by a march-past in front of the Queen and the Duke of Edinburgh through the castle quadrangle. From there, the various parading formations proceeded to march through the town in order to form up at a second location in Home Park. The royal party then followed by car along the parade route to the park. After the parade in the park, finishing the event was a main flypast of various aircraft, ending with the Red Arrows to close the ceremony. Following the ceremony, the Queen attended a marquee reception alongside 200 guests.

== Parade elements ==
=== Marchpast and parade to Home Park ===
The Castle Quadrangle was selected for the march past to provide a close proximity between the Queen and the parading service personnel. As the senior service, the Royal Navy were the first to march past the Queen. From the castle, the parade proceeded down Castle Hill, along Thames Street and Datchet Road, to enter Home Park via the Town Gate. An estimated 20,000 members of the public watched the parade go through the town.

For the Queen's subsequent car journey from the castle to the park, a tri-service guard of honour was formed along the parade route, drawn from personnel of the RAF Regiment, Coldstream Guards and Royal Navy. Mounted escorts of both the Blues and Royals and the Life Guards of the Household Cavalry Mounted Regiment provided a cavalry escort for the car journey, accompanied by music from the Mounted Band of the Life Guards with drum horse Achilles.

=== Parade in Home Park ===
The parade in Home Park took place in an arena with a grandstand looking over a parade ground, faced on the opposite side by a stage designed to look like Buckingham Palace (erected for the earlier Diamond Jubilee Pageant). A private arena, this parade took place in front of 3,800 invited guests, including 3,000 military personnel, their families and veterans and the monarchs of Brunei, Denmark, Lesotho, Luxembourg, Norway, Swaziland, Sweden, Thailand and Tonga (the Queen having hosted a luncheon for foreign monarchs in the castle the day before).

The parade opened with a drumhead service. The Chief of the Defence Staff, General Sir David Richards then made a speech to the Queen, to which the Queen responded. She was then given three cheers by the assembled ranks.

=== Flypasts ===
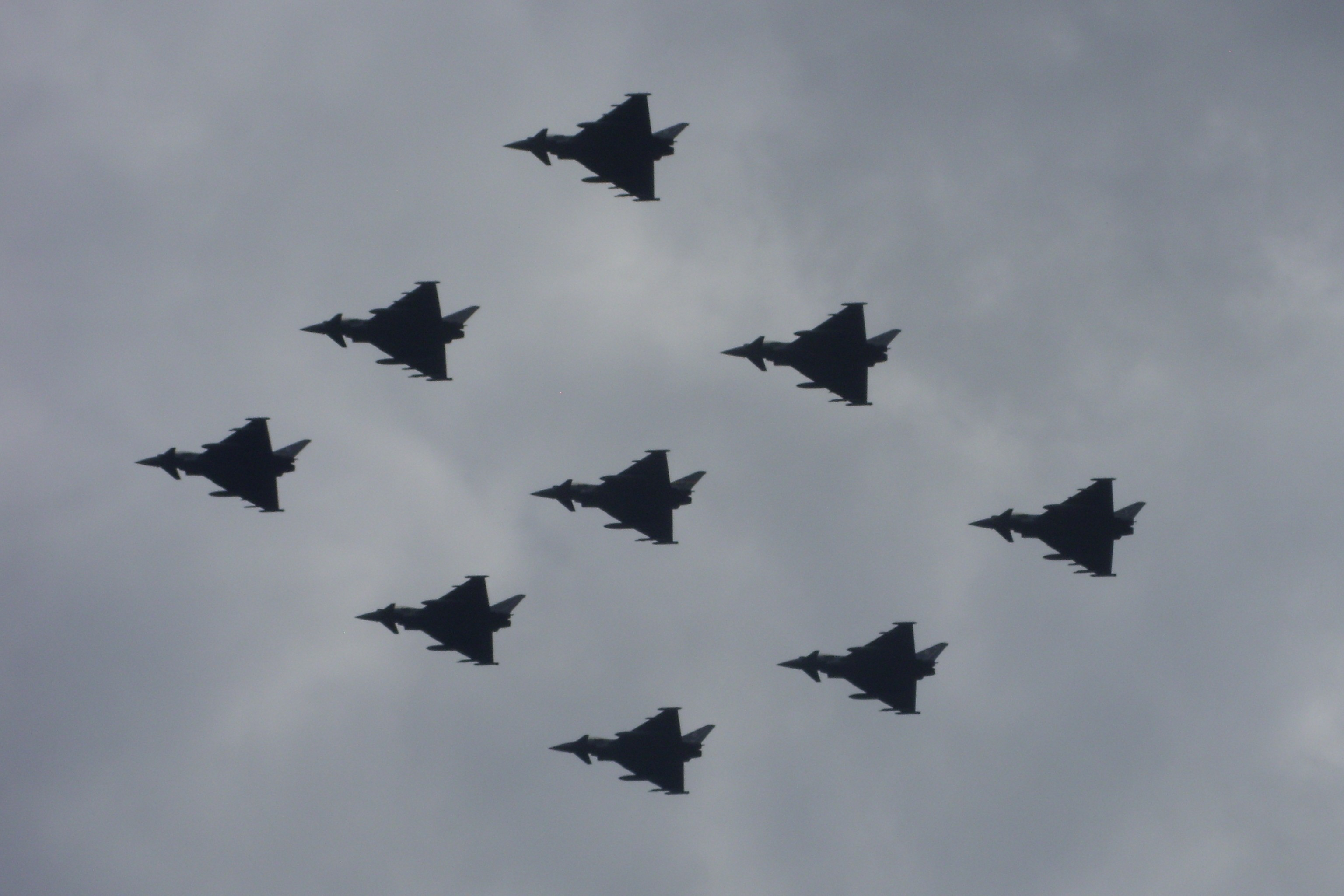
Eurofighter Typhoons in diamond formation

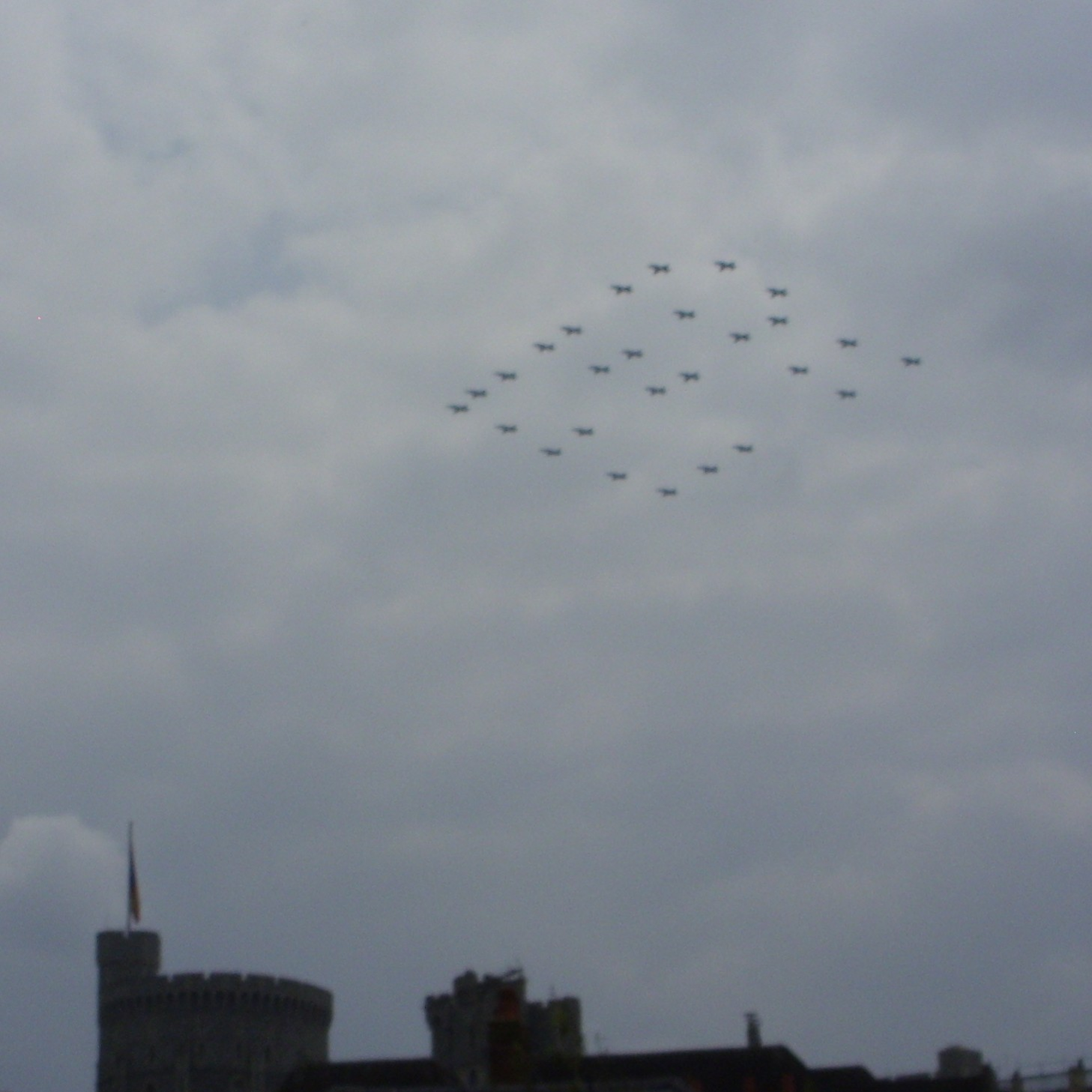
Hawk trainers in "E II R" formation

The flypast route was up the Long Walk and over the Castle. The initial flypast over the castle was by nine Royal Air Force Typhoons flying in diamond formation. The main flypast over Home Park featured 78 current and historic aircraft.

The main flypast formation was as follows: 13 helicopters from all three services led by a Merlin and including Chinook transports and Apache gunships, all flying from RAF Odiham; the Battle of Britain Memorial Flight historic aircraft with Lancaster bomber PA474 leading 4 Spitfires, all flying from RAF Coningsby; 20 Short Tucano RAF trainers flying from RAF Linton-on-Ouse in a '60' formation reflecting the Queen's 60-year reign; two Hercules RAF transports flying one behind the other and a VC10 RAF tanker (with fuel hoses deployed) flanked by two Tornado bombers, all flying from RAF Brize Norton; 27 Hawk RAF/Navy trainers flying from RAF Valley in an 'E II R' formation reflecting the Royal cypher, and finally 9 Hawks of the Red Arrows RAF display team flying in a three-dimensional diamond formation arranged especially for the Diamond Jubilee.

=== Music ===
The parade included six military bands. It featured both traditional music including performances of Rule Britannia and Land of Hope and Glory, as well as three new pieces written especially for the event. These were performed for the Queen prior to the main flypast.

== Broadcasting ==
The event was broadcast live on BBC One. Titled The Diamond Jubilee Armed Forces Tribute, it was presented by Fiona Bruce, Dan Snow, Eddie Butler and Julie Heptonstall.
