= Muster (military) =

Process of accounting for members of a military unit

In military organization, the term muster is the process or event of accounting for members in a military unit. This practice of inspections led to the coining of the English idiom pass muster, meaning being sufficient. When a unit is created, it is "mustered in" and when it is disbanded, it is "mustered out". If a unit "musters" it is generally to take account of who is present and who is not.

A muster roll is the list of members of a military unit, often including their rank and the dates they joined or left. A roll call is the reading aloud of the names on the muster roll and the responses, to determine who is present.

== United Kingdom ==
In Tudor England, musters were periodic assessments of the availability of local militia to act as a defence force. To some extent, the system was an outdated remnant of the feudal system where local lords had their own armies, which they provided for the King as required.

The British Armed Forces have a tradition of performing a muster for the reigning monarch during a jubilee year. For the first time all three service branches were present at the same time during the 2012 Diamond Jubilee Armed Forces Parade and Muster, held in celebration of the Diamond Jubilee of Elizabeth II.

== United States ==
Within the United States Army National Guard and the Army Reserve, muster is an annual event used for screening purposes of soldiers not otherwise required to perform any duties.
