= Elaine West =

English Royal Air Force officer

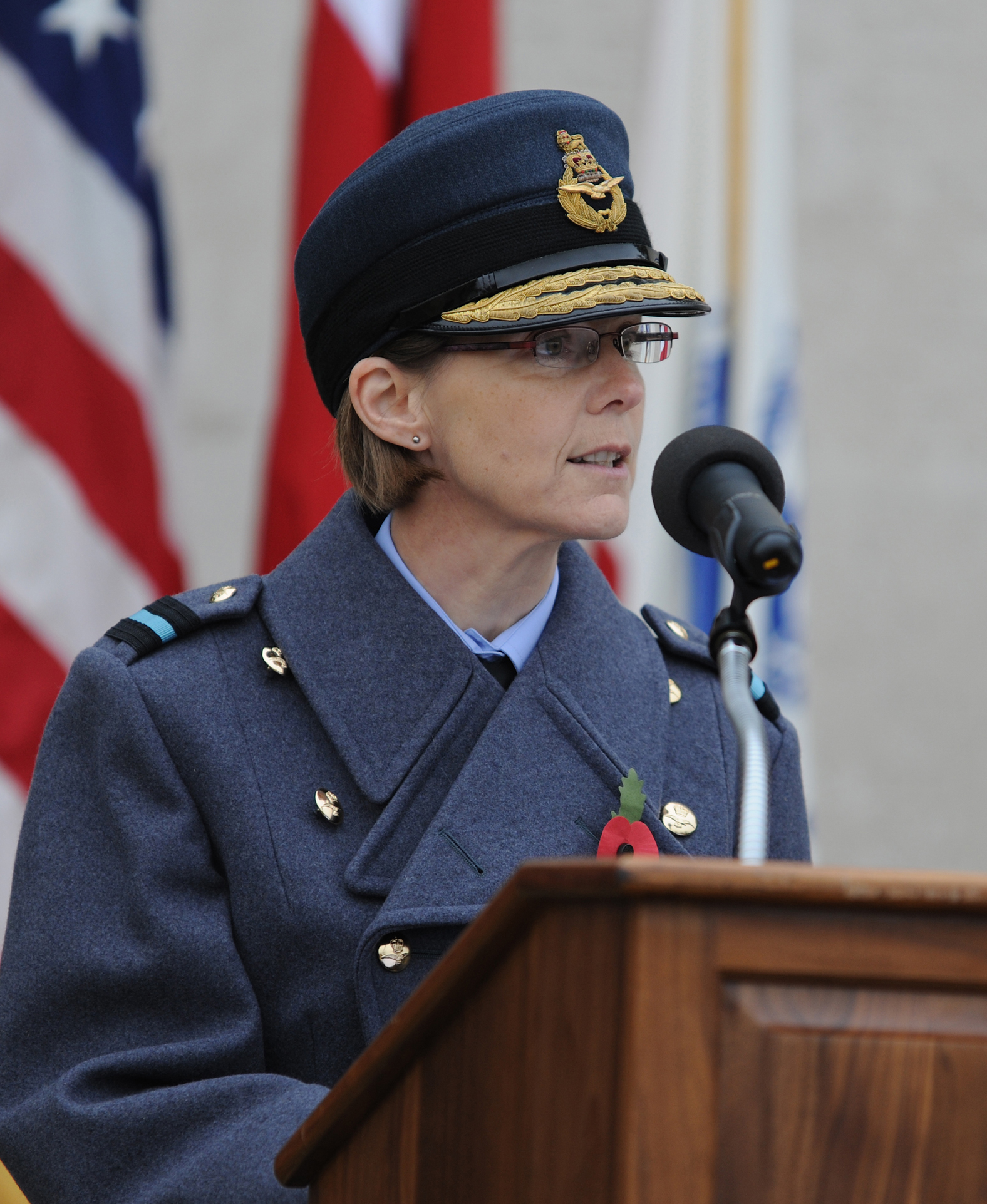
- Air Commodore Elaine West in 2011
- Born: Margaret Elaine Brindle
- Military career
- Allegiance: United Kingdom
- Branch: Royal Air Force
- Service years: 1978–present
- Rank: Air vice-marshal
- Awards: Commander of the Order of the British Empire

Air Vice-Marshal Margaret Elaine West, CBE (née Brindle; born September 1961) is a senior Royal Air Force officer. She was the first woman to hold a non-honorary air vice-marshal or equivalent rank in the British Armed Forces since the Second World War, and the first to achieve that rank in the regular forces. In September 2021, West was appointed to the Royal Household as a Lady Usher.

== Early life ==
West was born in September 1961. She was brought up in the Lake District.

== Military career ==
West joined the Women's Royal Air Force as an aircraftwoman in 1978 at the age of 17. She ended her service in the other ranks as a senior aircraftwoman. She was commissioned on 25 February 1982 in the rank of pilot officer with seniority from 8 December 1980. She was promoted to flying officer on 8 December 1982. On 21 March 1983, she transferred from the General Duties (Ground) Branch to the Administrative Branch of the RAF. She was promoted to flight lieutenant on 8 December 1986. On 26 October 1990, she transferred from a Short Service Commission to a Permanent Commission. As a part of the half-yearly promotions, she was promoted to squadron leader on 1 January 1991, to wing commander on 1 January 1997, and to group captain on 1 July 2003.

She was promoted to air commodore on 1 July 2008. She served as head of the Defence Estates' Operations Housing, thereby being in charge of the renovation of service accommodation. With her promotion to air vice-marshal on 1 August 2013, she became the highest ranking female in the British Armed Forces and the first regular to hold a two-star rank. She has been appointed director of Projects and Programme Delivery at the Defence Infrastructure Organisation. West was replaced by Tony Gosling in 2016. She is now an officer in the RAF Reserve.

== Personal life ==
West married an RAF Tornado navigator. He has since retired. Together they have one son.

== Honours and decorations ==

In the 2013 New Year Honours, West was appointed Commander of the Order of the British Empire (CBE). She is a recipient of the Queen Elizabeth II Golden Jubilee Medal and the Queen Elizabeth II Diamond Jubilee Medal. In 2018, she was awarded the Royal Air Force Long Service and Good Conduct Medal with two clasps: the medal represents 15 years service and each clasp is awarded for a further ten.
