= Matthew Sykes =

British Army general

Major General Matthew Sykes CVO
- Born: 1955 (age 70–71)
- Military career
- Allegiance: United Kingdom
- Branch: British Army
- Service years: 1976 – 2010
- Rank: Major General
- Commands: 3rd Regiment Royal Horse Artillery; Royal Artillery
- Conflicts: Northern Ireland; Bosnian War; Kosovo War
- Awards: Commander of the Royal Victorian Order

Major General Richard Matthew McQueen Sykes CVO is a retired senior British Army officer. He served for 35 years in the British Army, rising to the rank of Major General, with senior appointments in the Ministry of Defence and the Royal Household. On leaving the Army, he was for 14 years Chief Executive of UK-based charities. He now holds a range of consultancy, non-executive and voluntary roles.

== Military career ==
Sykes was commissioned into the Royal Artillery in 1976. He became Commanding Officer of 3rd Regiment Royal Horse Artillery in 1994. He went on to be Strategic Policy Chief at NATO's Supreme Headquarters Allied Powers Europe in 1997, Chief Co-ordinator of Joint Firepower for the Allied Rapid Reaction Corps in 2000 and Director of Corporate Communications for the Army at the Ministry of Defence in 2002. After that he became Director Royal Artillery in 2005 and then Defence Services Secretary in 2007 as well as Assistant Chief of Defence Staff (Personnel) from 2009 before retiring from the Army in 2010. He served on operations in Northern Ireland, Bosnia-Herzegovina and Kosovo. During his time as Defence Services Secretary, he was responsible for the introduction of the Elizabeth Cross awarded to families of the British Armed Forces killed in action or as a result of a terrorist attack since the Second World War.

== Post military career ==
After leaving the Army, from 2010 to 2014 he was Group Chief Executive of Elizabeth Finn Care, now called Turn2us, a British charity helping people in the UK struggling with financial hardship. During the same period he was a non-executive director of Elizabeth Finn Homes Limited, a company owned by the charity, responsible for the running of 9 care homes and 11 almshouses.

From 2015 to 2024, he was Chief Executive of the Sir Simon Milton Foundation, a charity based in the City of Westminster helping disadvantaged younger people in training and education and supporting older people, especially those who are lonely and socially isolated.

His voluntary posts have included: from 2007 to 2012 he was a Colonel Commandant of the Royal Regiment of Artillery; from 2007 to 2016 he was a Trustee of the Armed Forces Memorial Trust; in 2010 he was made a Freeman of the City of London; from 2010 to 2019 he was Honorary Regimental Colonel of the King's Troop, Royal Horse Artillery and, in this capacity, he was involved in the carriage of Margaret Thatcher's coffin to St Paul's Cathedral during her funeral; from 2015 to 2025 he was Gentleman Usher to Queen Elizabeth II and then to King Charles III; he remains an Extra Gentleman Usher.

His current roles include history and heritage consultant to St John's Wood Square Ltd, the company developing the former barracks St John's Wood Barracks, President of the Past Members of 3rd Regiment Royal Horse Artillery, Vice Chairman and then Chairman of the Royal National Lifeboat Institution South Wiltshire branch.

Military offices
Preceded by Peter Wilkinson	Defence Services Secretary; 2007–2010	Succeeded by David Murray
