= Jonathan Handley =

English Royal Navy commodore

Commodore Jonathan Handley
- Military career
- Allegiance: United Kingdom
- Branch: Royal Navy
- Rank: Commodore
- Commands: HMS Portland; CJOS-COE

Commodore Jonathan Handley is the Deputy Director, Combined Joint Operations from the Sea Center of Excellence.

== Early life ==
Handley was born in Southsea, and was educated at Felsted School in Essex.

== Naval career ==
Initially commissioned into submarines as the Cold War was drawing to a close, he transferred back to the surface navy in 1989 and qualified as a Principal Warfare Officer. Following a period in HMS SHEFFIELD during the first Gulf War and with the Joint Maritime Operational Training Staff, Handley joined HMS LONDON as the Executive Officer in 1994. This appointment saw two operational deployments, including one to the Balkans.

After a year on the staff of NATO's Standing Naval Force Atlantic, Handley was promoted to Commander in 1996 and, having completed the Joint Services Defence College, he became a member of the directing staff for the fledgling Joint Services Command and Staff College at Bracknell and instructed on courses 1 and 2. After a spell at the Maritime Warfare Centre as the Under Water Warfare specialist, he took command of a new Type 23 frigate, HMS PORTLAND, in 2000. Operational in just 10 months from leaving BAE systems on the Clyde, PORTLAND deployed to the Persian Gulf in early 2002 for 7 months.

After 2 years in command, Handley joined the Ministry of Defence in the Policy for Overseas Operations Directorate. Closely involved in the Head Office's Policy and Commitments reorganization in 2003, he moved to the Directorate of Strategic Plans for his last year in London before being promoted to Captain in 2004 and appointed to UK's Permanent Joint Headquarters as one of the two DACOS in the J3 Division. Supporting UK operations in Afghanistan, the Balkans and the UN, he oversaw relief efforts for both the tsunami in SE Asia and the earthquake in Pakistan, the build-up of UK forces in Op HERRICK and latterly the NEO from Beirut. In 2006 Handley assumed the duties of Assistant Director at the Higher Command and Staff Course at the UK Defence Academy before being appointed to Bahrain as the Deputy UKMCC in 2008. Promoted to Commodore on his return, Handley was appointed to the Navy Command Headquarters in Portsmouth as ACOS Warfare, bringing together and prioritising cross-maritime capabilities. In December 2009, Handley was appointed as the Deputy Director of the Combined Joint Operations from the Sea Centre of Excellence in Norfolk, Virginia, the only COE based in the United States.

Military offices
Preceded by	Deputy Director, CJOS-COE; December 2009-Present	Succeeded by incumbent
