= Patrick O'Dea (public servant) =

New Zealand public servant (1918–2010)

Sir Patrick Jerad O'Dea KCVO (18 April 1918 – 28 August 2010) was a senior New Zealand public servant who organised royal tours of New Zealand. He was educated in Dunedin at the Christian Brothers School (now called Kavanagh College)

== Death ==
O'Dea died on 28 August 2010, aged 92, after a long retirement in Waikanae, where he is buried.

== See also ==
- List of Lady & Gentleman Ushers
