= HMS Wizard (R72) =

W-class destroyer converted to Type 15 frigate of the Royal Navy

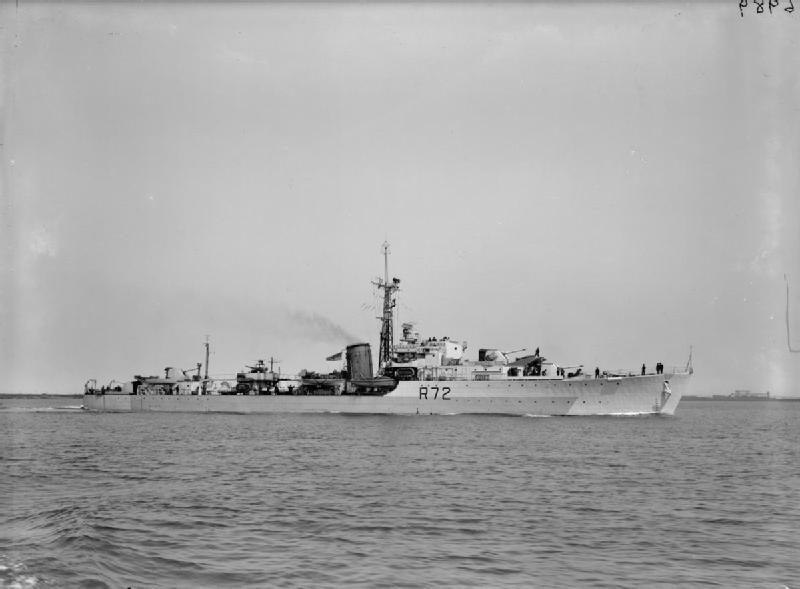
- Wizard in May 1945

History

United Kingdom
- Name: HMS Wizard
- Ordered: December 1941
- Builder: Vickers Armstrong, Barrow-in-Furness
- Yard number: 833
- Laid down: 14 September 1942
- Launched: 29 September 1943
- Commissioned: 30 March 1944
- Reclassified: Converted to Type 15 frigate 1954
- Identification: Pennant number R72/F72
- Motto: Endless endeavour
- Fate: Sold for scrap 16 February 1967

General characteristics as W class
- Class & type: W-class destroyer
- Displacement: 1,710 tons (1,730 tonnes); 2,530 tons full (2,570 tonnes)
- Length: 362.75 ft (110.57 m) o/a
- Beam: 35.75 ft (10.90 m)
- Draught: 10 ft (3.0 m)
- Propulsion: 2 Admiralty 3-drum boilers, Parsons single-reduction geared steam turbines, 40,000 shp (30 MW), 2 shafts
- Speed: 36 knots (67 km/h; 41 mph) / 32 knots (59 km/h; 37 mph) full
- Range: 4,675 nautical miles (8,658 km; 5,380 mi) at 20 knots (37 km/h; 23 mph)
- Complement: 179 (225 as leader)
- Sensors & processing systems: Radar Type 272 target indication; Radar Type 291 air warning; Radar Type 285 fire control on director Mk.III(W); Radar Type 282 fire control on 40 mm mount Mk.IV
- Armament: 4 × QF 4.7-inch (120-mm) L/45 Mk.IX, single mounts CP Mk.XXII; 4 × QF 2 pdr Mk.VIII, quad mount Mk.VII, or; 2 × QF 40 mm Bofors, twin mount "Hazemeyer" Mk.IV; 4 × A/A mountings; twin 20 mm Oerlikon Mk.V; single Bofors 40 mm Mk.III or "Boffin" Mk.V; single QF 2 pdr Mk.XVI; 8 (4x2) tubes for 21 inch (533 mm) torpedoes Mk.IX; 2 racks & 4 throwers for 70 depth charges

General characteristics Type 15 frigate
- Class & type: Type 15 frigate
- Displacement: 2,300 tons (standard)
- Length: 358 ft (109 m) o/a
- Beam: 37.75 ft (11.51 m)
- Draught: 14.5 ft (4.4 m)
- Propulsion: 2 × Admiralty 3-drum boilers, steam turbines on 2 shafts, 40,000 shp (30 MW)
- Speed: 31 knots (57 km/h; 36 mph) (full load)
- Complement: 174
- Sensors & processing systems: Radar; Type 293Q target indication.; Type 277Q surface search; Type 974 navigation; Type 262 fire control on director CRBF; Type 1010 Cossor Mark 10 IFF; Sonar: Type 174 search; Type 162 target classification; Type 170 attack
- Armament: 1 × twin 4 in gun Mark 19; 1 × twin 40mm Bofors Mk.5; 2 × Squid A/S mortar or; 2 × Limbo Mark 10 A/S mortar

HMS Wizard was a W-class destroyer of the British Royal Navy that saw service during World War II.

== Second World War service ==
In 1942, as part of Warship Week, Wizard was adopted by the Borough of Wood Green in London. The plaque from this adoption is held by the National Museum of the Royal Navy in Portsmouth.

Wizard was initially deployed to the Home Fleet, before joining a mixed destroyer group on 6 May 1944, assigned to screen for aircraft carriers Furious and Searcher. These duties continued until 9 June 1944, when she sustained major damage from an explosion of her own depth charges, which caused considerable compartment flooding. The ship was towed to Lyness on the following day for emergency dry dock repair, later being towed to Middlesbrough for further repairs which lasted until April 1945. Over this period Wizard was reassigned for deployment to the British Pacific Fleet. After a period of sea-trials and preparation, it made passage to the Pacific, with a final resupply in Sydney, before joining the 27th Destroyer Flotilla in August. Although arriving in theatre before the end of the war, and being listed as part of the British Pacific Fleet present in Tokyo Bay when the surrender was signed on 2 September 1945, Wizard did not receive a Battle Honour as she had not been deployed operationally during the short time she was with the flotilla.

== Post War service ==
From 1946 until 1951 Wizard served in the Plymouth local flotilla. During 1953 and 1954 she was converted at Devonport Dockyard into a Type 15 fast anti-submarine frigate, with the new pennant number F72. After the completion of her trials in November 1954 "Wizard" was deployed to Londonderry, Northern Ireland [3rd Training Squadron]. In October 1955 "Wizard" took part in retrieving the bodies of nine crew members of a Royal Air Force Neptune aircraft that had crashed into the Atlantic off Ireland. The aircraft and "Wizard" were going to the aid of an Icelandic Trawler [Einar Olfson] In 1956 Wizard was part of the 5th Frigate Squadron and was deployed to the eastern Mediterranean as part of the Royal Navy force which took part in the Suez Crisis. On return to UK in May 1957 the frigate refitted at Chatham before joining the Dartmouth Training Squadron for two years before being deployed in the West Indies with the 8th Frigate Squadron until 1964. On return she resumed Cadet training and remained with the Dartmouth Squadron until 1966.

== Decommissioning and disposal ==
In 1966 she was paid-off and was reduced to Reserve status. She was then placed on the Disposal List and sold to Thos. W. Ward for demolition on 16 February 1967. Taken in tow to Inverkeithing she arrived at the breaker's yard on 7 March that year.

== Commanding officers ==
From	To	Captain
1950	1951	
1953	1954	Under conversion to Type 15 Frigate
1956	1956	Commander J Jungius RN
1962	1963	Commander W D Jenks RN

== Publications ==
- Colledge, J. J.; Warlow, Ben (2006) [1969]. Ships of the Royal Navy: The Complete Record of All Fighting Ships of the Royal Navy from the 15th Century to the Present (3rd Rev ed.). London: Chatham Publishing. ISBN 978-1-86176-281-8. OCLC 67375475.
- Raven, Alan; Roberts, John (1978). War Built Destroyers O to Z Classes. London: Bivouac Books. ISBN 0-85680-010-4.
- Whitley, M. J. (1988). Destroyers of World War 2. Annapolis, Maryland: Naval Institute Press. ISBN 0-87021-326-1.
