= Small nucleolar RNA R72 =

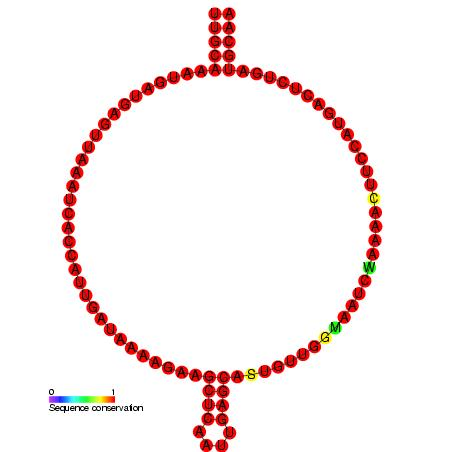
- Predicted secondary structure and sequence conservation of snoR72

Identifiers
- Symbol: snoR72
- Rfam: RF00208

Other data
- RNA type: Gene; snRNA; snoRNA; CD-box
- Domain: Eukaryota
- GO: GO:0006396 GO:0005730
- SO: SO:0001263
- PDB structures: PDBe

In molecular biology, Small nucleolar RNA R72 (also known as snoR72) is a non-coding RNA (ncRNA) molecule identified in plants which functions in the modification of other small nuclear RNAs (snRNAs). This type of modifying RNA is usually located in the nucleolus of the eukaryotic cell which is a major site of snRNA biogenesis. It is known as a small nucleolar RNA (snoRNA) and also often referred to as a guide RNA.

snoR72 belongs to the C/D box class of snoRNAs which contain the conserved sequence motifs known as the C box (UGAUGA) and the D box (CUGA). Most of the members of the box C/D family function in directing site-specific 2'-O-methylation of substrate RNAs.

snoR72 was originally identified in Arabidopsis thaliana and is predicted to acts as a methylation guide for 25S ribosomal RNA rRNA.
