= 1974 New Zealand bravery awards =

The 1974 New Zealand bravery awards were announced via a Special Honours List dated 29 March 1974, and recognised one person for an act of bravery the previous year.

== Order of the British Empire ==
=== Member (MBE) ===
Civil division, for gallantry

- Joseph Dennis Farrow – inspector, New Zealand Police.

On 30th November 1973, following a report of a robbery, Inspector Farrow went to the Evening Post Building in Wellington where, with other members of the police, he came into confrontation with a man armed with a .303 rifle which was loaded and cocked.

The man was in an extremely disturbed emotional state and had already fired one shot to demonstrate determination in his purpose which was to shoot his recently divorced wife. Such was his mental state that he had made up his mind to shoot anyone who got in his way. On at least four occasions the armed man reacted violently to incidents to the point where it was feared that he was going to shoot. Almost throughout the incident, involving some four hours, Inspector Farrow was in immediate personal danger of being shot but nevertheless he conversed in placatory terms with the man and managed to soothe him to the extent that it was eventually possible to approach close enough to disarm him.

The display of courage and astuteness by Inspector Farrow in effecting the arrest of an armed and dangerously emotional offender prevented what could have developed into a violent rampage in which death or injury to members of the public or police would have been probable.
