= Arthur Collins (courtier) =

Arthur Collins CB MVO (26 June 1845 – 21 November 1911) was Equerry and Comptroller for Princess Louise, Queen Victoria's 4th daughter and Gentleman Usher in the households of Queen Victoria and King Edward VII. He attended Princess Louise in her role as the wife of John Campbell, 9th Duke of Argyll (at that time Marquis of Lorne), who was Governor General and Vice Regent of Canada between 1878 and 1883. Collins represented Princess Louise at the funerals of Lord Beaconsfield, Benjamin Disraeli, and William Ewart Gladstone, the two competing Prime Ministers during Queen Victoria's reign. Collins attended as a Gentleman Usher the coronation of King Edward VII and probably Victoria's funeral.

== Birth and early life ==
Collins was born on 26 June 1845, in Berkshire to Reverend John Ferdinando Collins (1812–1889) and Sarah Hawthorne Collins (1809–1906), who was born in Jamaica. His father was Landed Proprietor Curate of Lockinge, and served Lord Wantage, whose estate contained one of the ancient Anglo-Saxon sites in England. The Collinses lived at Betterton House, Lockinge, "an estate which had descended from father to son since the time of Henry VI" and which passed into the hands of Baron Wantage on the death of Collins's father in 1889.

Collins was the seventh of eight children: John Ferdinando (1837–1910), Henry (1839–1914), Charles (1841–1907), Robert Hawthorne, K.C.B., K.C.V.O. (1841–1908), Emley Jane, later Emily (1842–1900), Fanny Katherine (1844–1850), Arthur and Francis (1851–1878). Robert was tutor to the Prince Leopold, Duke of Albany, living in Windsor Castle, and later comptroller and equerry to the Duke and, after his death, to the Duchess of Albany.

Collins was educated at Marlborough College, matriculating in 1859 and graduating in 1863.

== Military career ==
As was common at the time, Collins purchased his position as ensign or second lieutenant on 23 December 1864 in the 57th (West Middlesex) Regiment of Foot, or the Duke of Cambridge's Own (Middlesex Regiment). He advanced through the ranks, gaining the appointments of lieutenant in 1869, captain in 1873, and major in 1881. He served in the British Colony of Natal in South Africa during the Anglo-Zulu War of 1879, receiving a medal for his service.

He retired from the army on 25 February 1885 with the honorary rank of lieutenant colonel.

Because of his successful military career, he was eligible to serve as equerry in the Royal households, and he spent the rest of life serving Victoria and Edward VII, both as the Prince of Wales and King of England. Called Lieutenant Colonel Collins, he served as Gentleman at Arms, Gentleman Usher to Queen Victoria, and Gentleman Usher Quarterly Waiter. By 1901 he was styled Lieutenant-Colonel Arthur Collins, M.V.O., C.B., Commander, Hohelzollern Order.

== Career as courtier ==
In 1882 Collins was Comptroller and Equerry of the Household of H.R.H. Princess Louise (Marchioness of Lorne). After Princess Louise's husband, John Campbell, 9th Duke of Argyll, then the Marquis of Lorne, was appointed Regent of Canada, the couple traveled back and forth between England and Canada (and, in the winter, Bermuda for Louise). Collins was appointed Equerry to Princess Louise partway through their term, and for a short time served as Acting Equerry to the Governor General and Vice Regent, John Campbell.

Collins was also an Equerry in Victoria's and Edward VII's households and a Gentleman Usher to Queen Victoria. In that capacity he travelled with the royal family. In Osborne, according to Frederick Ponsonby, Collins and Alec Yorke were both "outstanding actors," and they "alternately drilled the members of the Household and produced plays."

He represented Princess Louise at the funeral of Benjamin Disraeli on 26 April 1881, marching in the procession with the members of the Queen's household, including Edward Albert, Prince of Wales (later King Edward VII), Prince Arthur, Duke of Connaught and Strathearn, and Prince Leopold, Duke of Albany, as well as the representatives of Victoria's other children. He represented Princess Louise at Gladstone's funeral as well. He was a "Gold Officer" at the coronation of King Edward VII, conducting "the company to their seats and [performing] similar services within Westminster Abbey," and Gentleman Usher to the King.

As a courtier in London, Collins had access to levels of society that would not likely to have been open to him without his royal appointment. Besides representing Princess Louise at official functions, he formed friendships with Constance and Cyril Flower, 1st Baron Battersea) and Lady Battersea, Arthur Bigge, 1st Baron Stamfordham, Sir Algernon West (Gladstone's private secretary, 1861-1894), and Alick (Alexander Graham) Yorke.

== Personal life ==
Collins met Mark Twain twice while he was in Canada. James Abbott McNeill Whistler records meeting him twice, but clearly they had already met, as they recognized each other, with Whistler emphasizing how "correct" Collins was.

Among his friends was George William Spencer Lyttelton, who assisted Gladstone in several capacities from 1874 to 1892. From musical and theatrical circles his friends included Arthur Sullivan, John Hare, Alfred Cellier, George du Maurier and Arthur Cecil Blunt. He was one of the pallbearers at Sullivan's funeral. His friends among the landed gentry included people whose estates offered outstanding golf: Mr. and Mrs. Asquith (Collins visited the golf course at St. Andrews); Lord Dartmouth, who had an "excellent private [golf] course at Patshull"; and Sir Edward Lawson, who hosted "week-end parties at the private links at Hall Barn."

He was a friend of American short-story writer Bret Harte from 1885 until Harte's death in 1902. According to Axel Nissen, Collins was Harte's "closest male companion during the last seventeen years of his life." Harte described Collins as "a very charming 'Warrington sort of fellow,'" apparently a reference to the character in Thackeray's Pendennis, who is a "woman-hater" and a "professed misogynist." What may have been Collins's interest in men may have extended to boys as well; Nissen offers as evidence a friendship with the then 11-year-old "painter-prodigy Brian Hatton," photographs with Collins's "gardener boy," cut out and saved poems idealizing boys, Collins's "concern for the welfare of the District Messenger Boys" mentioned in his obituary in The Times, and a "'bronze statuette of a nude boy' given to him by the artist" William Goscombe John mentioned in his will.

Collins was also Justice of the peace in Hampshire. He was also Comptroller for Princess Louise and Acting Equerry for John Campbell, Marquis of Lorne, Governor General of Canada for a short time. He was a Commander of the House Order of Hohenzollern.
