= Air vice-marshal =

Two-star air-officer rank

Air vice-marshal (Air Vce Mshl or AVM) is an air officer rank used by some air forces, with origins from the Royal Air Force. The rank is also used by the air forces of many countries which have historical British influence and it is sometimes used as the English translation of an equivalent rank in countries which have a non-English air force-specific rank structure.

Air vice-marshal is usually equivalent to the naval rank of rear admiral or a rank of major general in an army. The rank of air vice-marshal is immediately senior to the rank of air commodore and immediately subordinate to the rank of air marshal. Since before the Second World War it has been common for air officers commanding RAF groups to hold the rank of air vice-marshal. In small air forces such as the Royal New Zealand Air Force and the Ghana Air Force, the head of the air force holds the rank of air vice-marshal.

The equivalent rank in the Women's Auxiliary Air Force, Women's Auxiliary Australian Air Force, Women's Royal Air Force (until 1968) and Princess Mary's Royal Air Force Nursing Service (until 1980) was "air chief commandant".

== Australia ==
The Australian Air Corps adopted the RAF rank system on 9 November 1920 and this usage was continued by its successor, the Royal Australian Air Force. However, the rank of air vice-marshal was not used by the Australian Armed Forces until 1935 when Richard Williams, the Australian Chief of the Air Staff, was promoted. Margaret Staib of the Royal Australian Air Force served in the rank of air vice-marshal from 2009 to 2012 when she retired from the Australian Defence Force.

== Canada ==
In 1920, Sir Willoughby Gwatkin, the former Canadian Chief of the General Staff, was granted the rank of air vice-marshal and appointed the inspector-general of the newly established Canadian Air Force. The rank was used until the 1968 unification of the Canadian Forces, when army-type rank titles were adopted. Canadian air vice-marshals then became major-generals. In official Canadian French usage, the rank title was vice-maréchal de l'air.

== United Kingdom ==
Air vice-marshal
- Shoulder board and sleeve insignia

- Masthead distinguishing flag

- Motor car star plate
- Country: United Kingdom
- Service branch: Royal Air Force
- Abbreviation: AVM / Air Vce Mshl
- Rank group: Officers of air rank
- Rank: Two-star rank
- NATO rank code: OF-7
- Formation: 1 August 1919
- Next higher rank: Air marshal
- Next lower rank: Air commodore
- Equivalent ranks: Rear admiral (RN); Major general (British Army; RM)

=== Origins ===
On 1 April 1918, the newly created RAF adopted its officer rank titles from the British Army, with officers at what is now air vice-marshal level holding the rank of major general. In response to the proposal that the RAF should use its own rank titles, it was suggested that the RAF might use the Royal Navy's officer ranks, with the word "air" inserted before the naval rank title. For example, the rank that later became air vice-marshal would have been air rear admiral. The Admiralty objected to any use of their rank titles, including this modified form, and so an alternative proposal was put forward: air officer ranks would be based on the term "ardian", which was derived from a combination of the Gaelic words for "chief" (ard) and "bird" (eun), with the term "third ardian" or "squadron ardian" being used for the equivalent to rear admiral and major general. However, air vice-marshal was preferred and was adopted in August 1919. The following officers were the first to be appointed to the rank, and their former service ranks are also shown:

Officer	Rank in RAF	Rank in Army	Rank in Navy
Edward Ashmore	Major general	Major general	None
Sir Sefton Brancker	Major general	Major general	None
Edward Ellington	Major general	Brigadier	None
John Higgins	Major general	Brigadier	None
Sir Godfrey Paine	Major general	None	Rear admiral
Sir Geoffrey Salmond	Major general	Major general	None
Sir John Salmond	Major general	Major general	None
Sir Frederick Sykes	Major general	Major general	Wing captain
Sir Hugh Trenchard	Major general	Major general	None

=== RAF insignia, command flag and star plate ===
The rank insignia consists of a narrow light blue band (on a slightly wider black band) over a light blue band on a broad black band. This is worn on both the lower sleeves of the dress uniform or on the shoulders of the flying suit or working uniform.

The command flag of an air vice-marshal has two narrow red bands running through the centre.

The vehicle star plate for an air vice-marshal depicts two white stars (air vice-marshal is a two-star rank) on an air force blue background.

An RAF air vice-marshal's sleeve mess insignia

An RAF air vice-marshal's shoulder board

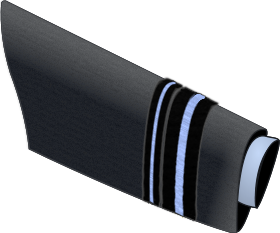
An RAF air vice-marshal's sleeve on No. 1 service dress uniform

An RAF air vice-marshal's star plate

As of August 2014, air vice-marshal was the highest uniformed military rank currently held by a woman in the British Armed Forces when Air Vice-Marshal Elaine West was awarded the position in August 2013.

== Gallery ==
(Royal Australian Air Force)

(Bangladesh Air Force)

(Ghana Air Force)

(Indian Air Force)

(Namibian Air Force)

(Nigerian Air Force)

(Pakistan Air Force)

(Sri Lanka Air Force)

(Royal Air Force)

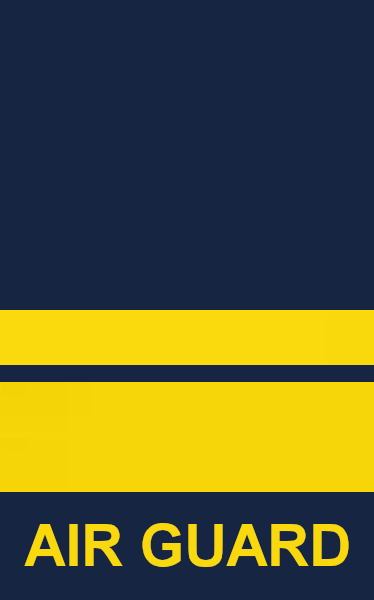
(Trinidad and Tobago Air Guard)

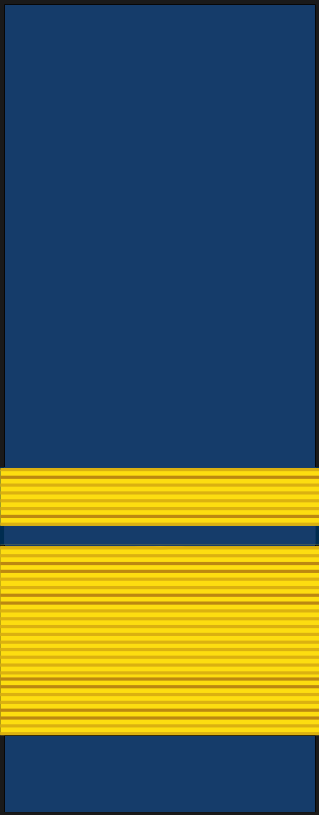
(Air Force of Zimbabwe)

== See also ==
- Air force officer rank insignia
- Air vice marshal (Australia)
- British and US military ranks compared
- Comparative military ranks
- RAF officer ranks
- Ranks of the RAAF
