= Royal Auxiliary Air Force =

Part-time reserve of the Royal Air Force

- Badge of the Royal Auxiliary Air Force
- Founded: October 1924; 102 years ago
- Country: United Kingdom
- Branch: Royal Air Force
- Type: Volunteer Reserve, Auxiliaries
- Size: 1,940 personnel
- Part of: British Armed Forces
- Mottos: "Comitamur Ad Astra" (Latin) (We go with them to the stars)
- Colors: Red, white, blue
- Website: Royal Air Force Auxiliary

Commanders
- Commandant General of the RAuxAF: Air Vice-Marshal Joanne Lincoln
- Inspector of the RAuxAF: Group Captain Andy Calame
- Command Warrant Officer: Warrant Officer Chris Peacock
- Honorary Air Commodore in Chief: Prince Richard, Duke of Gloucester

Insignia
- Roundel

- Fin flash

- Ensign

The Royal Auxiliary Air Force (RAuxAF), formerly the Auxiliary Air Force (AAF), together with the Air Force Reserve, is a component of His Majesty's Reserve Air Forces (Reserve Forces Act 1996, Part 1, Para 1,(2),(c)). It provides a primary reinforcement capability for the regular service, and consists of paid volunteers who give up some of their weekends, evenings and holidays to train at one of a number of squadrons around the United Kingdom. Its current mission is to provide trained personnel in support of the regular Royal Air Force (RAF).

== Formation ==
The Royal Auxiliary Air Force owes its origin to Lord Trenchard's vision of an elite corps of civilians who would serve their country in flying squadrons in their spare time. Instituted by the Auxiliary Air Force Order 1924 (SR&O 1924/1212), an Order in Council, on 9 October 1924, the first Auxiliary Air Force squadrons were formed the following year. The pilots of AAF squadrons were generally formed from the wealthier classes, as applicants were expected to already have, or be prepared to obtain, their pilot's licence at their own expense, at a cost of £96, about £5,000 today. The Royal Air Force Reserve (RAFR) differs in that its members were trained in the RAF and left, but are obliged to return to service if required. Pilots of the AAF were expected to join for a period of no less than five years, and were required to fly a few hours every quarter and attend annual training for 15 days. Each squadron was provided with a town base for training, and facilities at an aerodrome. All serving members were required to wear the letter A on their uniforms.

== Second World War ==
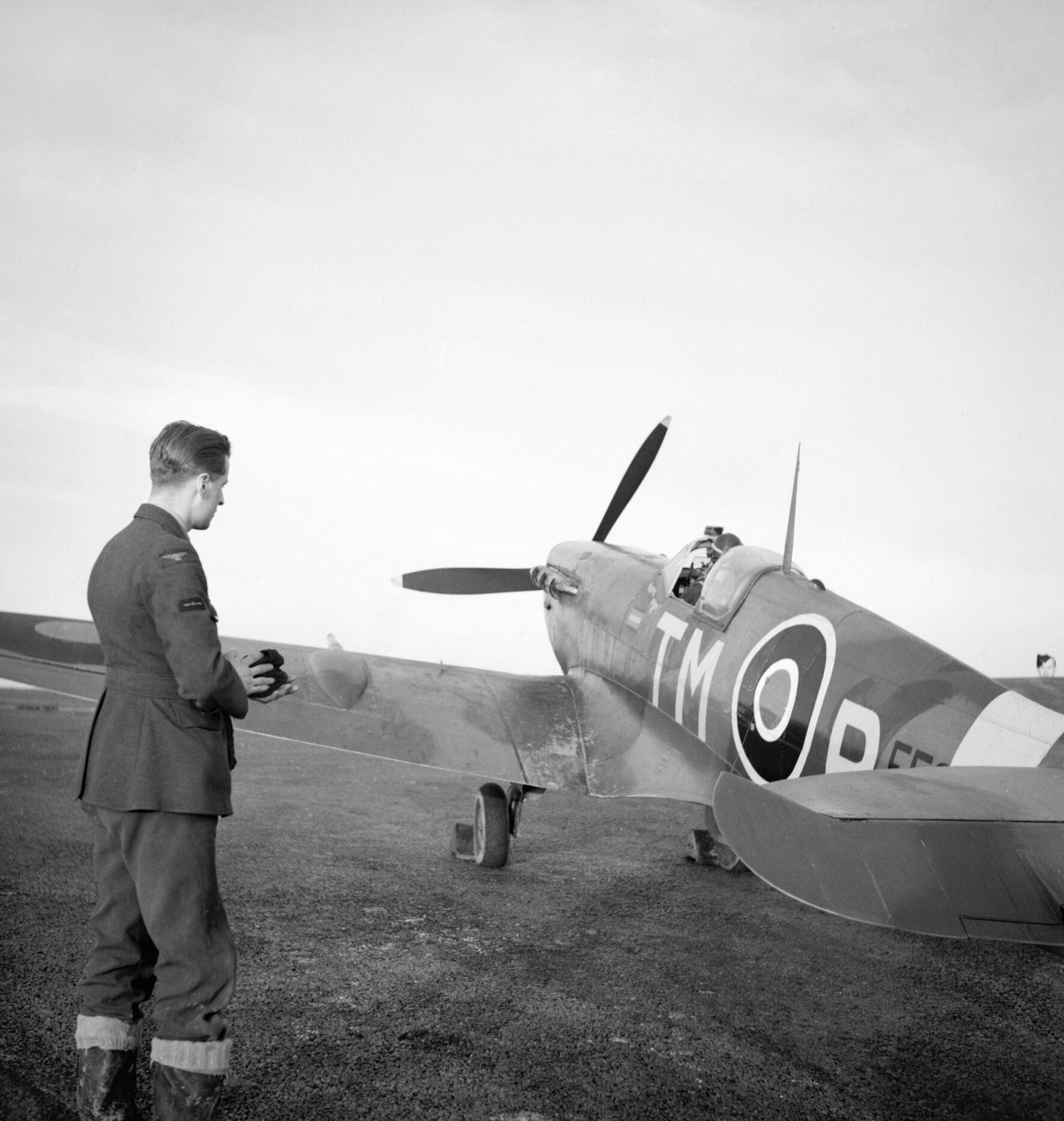
A No. 504 (County of Nottingham) Squadron Supermarine Spitfire during WWII

By March 1939, 21 flying squadrons had been formed, the 20 surviving units being 'embodied' (included) with the Royal Air Force at the outbreak of war. Notably, all enlisted men continued to serve under their auxiliary conditions of service until they expired when they were required to transfer to the RAFVR. The squadrons were equipped with a variety of operational aircraft which included Hurricanes and Spitfires. The squadrons scored a number of notable successes before and during the Second World War: the first flight over Mount Everest, undertaken by auxiliary pilots from 602 Squadron, the first German aircraft destroyed over British territorial waters – and over the mainland, the first U-boat to be destroyed with the aid of airborne radar, the first kill of a V-1 flying bomb; the first to be equipped with jet-powered aircraft, and the highest score of any British night fighter squadron. In the Battle of Britain, the AAF provided 14 of the 62 squadrons in RAF Fighter Command's Order of Battle and accounted for approximately 30% of the accredited enemy kills. Indeed, in 11 Group Fighter Command, that saw the heaviest fighting over South East England in 1940, of the 15 top scoring squadrons, eight were auxiliary. The losses sustained during the Battle of Britain, as with all other squadrons, were replaced by drafting in regular and RAFVR pilots. In fact, the volunteer reserves of the RAF outnumbered the regular RAF pilots in the Battle of Britain.

The Tactical Air Force squadrons were chosen to carry out several successful ultra low-level raids on key 'pin-point' targets in occupied Europe. The Balloon Squadrons also played their part, downing and deterring many hostile aircraft, and were accredited with the destruction of 279 V-1 flying bombs.

The Auxiliary Air Force was also responsible for the anti-aircraft balloon defences of the UK. At the outbreak of war in 1939 there were about 42 Squadrons operating barrage balloons, with the number of squadrons peaking at about 102 in 1944.

== Cold War ==
These achievements were honoured by the prefix "Royal", conferred by King George VI in 1947. Twenty of the pre-war squadrons were reformed postwar as fighter units. Events after the Second World War heralded a time of great danger for the UK: the onset of the Cold War with the Communist Bloc leading to the Berlin Air Lift and ultimately the outbreak of the Korean War in June 1950. During these crises the RAuxAF fighter squadrons, the five newly formed air observation post (AOP) squadrons and other RAuxAF units, played their part in the UK's air defence and participated in many NATO air exercises. In 1951, at the height of the Korean War, all 20 RAuxAF fighter squadrons (representing one third of Fighter Command strength) were called up for three months full-time service; they were required for home defence in place of regular squadrons earmarked for deployment to Korea. In the event RAF fighter squadrons were not needed in Korea, but the RAuxAF squadrons were retained for intensive refresher training at their home bases.

On 10 March 1957 all 20 RAuxAF fighter squadrons were disbanded, along with the five post-war AOP squadrons and the Light Anti-Aircraft ground-based squadrons of the Royal Auxiliary Air Force Regiment. In the following two years or so, the Auxiliary Fighter Control Units associated with them were also disbanded. On 16 March 1960, the Air Commodore-in-Chief and Prince Philip, Duke of Edinburgh, invited the Squadron Commanders and Flight Commanders of all the disbanded Royal Auxiliary Air Force units to a reception at Buckingham Palace. All were given the following letter from the Air Commodore-in-Chief:

BUCKINGHAM PALACE

I have welcomed this opportunity of taking leave of the Commanding Officers and senior Auxiliary officers of the squadrons of the Royal Auxiliary Air Force which are being disbanded and of sending through them this message of appreciation and thanks to all their officers, airmen and airwomen.

The history of the Auxiliary Air Force has been a glorious one. The first Auxiliary squadrons were included in the Air Defence of Great Britain in 1925. By the outbreak of war in 1939 the Auxiliary fighter, coastal and balloon squadrons formed an integral and vital part of our forces. It was aircraft of these squadrons which shot down the first enemy bomber over this country; and Auxiliary squadrons were heavily engaged in the air over Dunkirk and throughout the Battle of Britain. Later they were to win battle honours over the Atlantic, in Malta, North Africa, Sicily and Italy, the Arakan and Burma, and in Normandy, France and Germany.

After the war, the fighter squadrons were reconstituted as the Royal Auxiliary Air Force and the traditional spirit of voluntary service found new outlets with the formation of Regiment, Air OP, Fighter Control and Radar reporting Units, some of which are to remain in being and provide further opportunities for voluntary service.

The association of the Force with my family has always been close. I was proud to become Honorary Air Commodore of Nos 603, 2603 and 3603 (City of Edinburgh) Squadrons in 1951 and to succeed my father as Honorary Air Commodore-in-Chief of the Royal Auxiliary Air Force in 1952. Members of my family have always treasured their association with Auxiliary squadrons as Honorary Air Commodores.

I wish as Air Commodore-in-Chief to thank officers, airmen and airwomen of the Royal Auxiliary Air Force for all that they have given to the service of the country by their enthusiasm, their spirit and their devotion to duty in peace and war. It is a sad day when it is necessary to tell so many that it is no longer possible to use their services on the duties they have assumed so willingly. I wish them to know that they can look back with pride and satisfaction to service well done.

16 March 1957

Elizabeth R

The renaissance of the RAuxAF began in 1959 with the formation of three Maritime Headquarters Units and one Maritime Support Unit. The MSU in Belfast was short-lived, but No 1 (County of Hertford) MHU in Northwood, No 2 (City of Edinburgh) MHU in Edinburgh and No 3 (County of Devon) MHU in Mountbatten continued in existence until No 3 was amalgamated into No 1 in 1999. Later that year No 1 was renumbered 600 (City of London) Squadron and No 2 was renumbered 603 (City of Edinburgh) Squadron. These three units formed the entirety of the RAuxAF for twenty years until expansion starting in 1979, with the formation of three Regiment Field Squadrons, continuing with a Movements Squadron in 1982, and, following lessons learned during the Falklands conflict, an Aeromedical Evacuation Squadron in 1983. A later addition, in 1987, was an auxiliary element (The Grampian Troop) formed within a regular RAF Regiment Rapier Air Defence Squadron. Another step forward was taken in 1986, with the raising of four Defence Force Flights with the role of ground defence of key points on air bases. In 1984, the RAuxAF's Diamond Jubilee was marked by the award to the Service of its own badge, which forms the basic motif of the Sovereign's Colour for the Royal Auxiliary Force presented by Queen Elizabeth II in 1989. The words of the badge motto are COMITAMUR AD ASTRA – Latin "We go with them to the stars".

== Gulf War and beyond ==
During the Gulf War in 1991, the Aeromedical and Movements Squadrons were mobilised and performed with great distinction in theatre and at other locations in the UK and overseas.

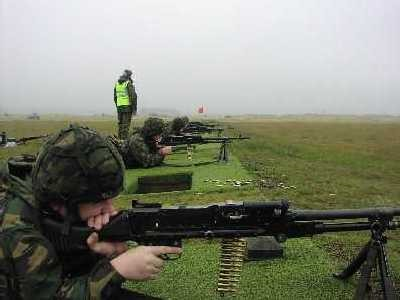
2623sqn RAuxAF Regiment Shooting GPMG on range

On 5 April 1997, all of the four war-appointable flights of the then Royal Air Force Volunteer Reserve were fully amalgamated into the RAuxAF, each with squadron status. In recognition of their origins, and in the absence of direct county or city territorial affiliations, they were each given the honour of retaining the letters "VR" within their squadron titles. The remaining non-active support elements of the RAFVR were and remain unaffected by this amalgamation, namely the RAFVR(T), the RAFVR(UAS), and at its point of formation, the RAFVR(DTUS) (being the branches for Training, University Air Squadron, and the Defence Technical Undergraduate Scheme, respectively).

The 2622sqn RAuxAF Regiment standard is presented to an officer on 30 September 2006.

During 2003 the RAuxAF was involved in the first large-scale mobilisation for over 50 years. More than 900 personnel, over 70% of its trained strength, were called into full-time service and were deployed to support RAF operations in Cyprus, Kuwait, Iraq, Afghanistan and the Falkland Islands, as well as those in the UK.

The Royal Auxiliary Air Force establishment (liability) is set at 2,920 – though recruitment difficulties mean the RAuxAF is currently at a strength well below that. The RAuxAF comprised 1,510 personnel as of April 2014.

On 19 July 2007, Senior Aircraftman Chris Dunsmore, aged 29, of 504 (County of Nottingham) Sqn RAuxAF was one of three men killed by a rocket attack on the RAF base at Basrah Airport, Iraq. He was the first serving RAuxAF member killed by enemy action since the Second World War.

On 13 April 2008, Senior Aircraftman Gary Thompson, aged 51, of 504 (County of Nottingham) Sqn RAuxAF was killed by a roadside bomb while on patrol in Kandahar. SAC Thompson was the oldest British serviceman killed in Afghanistan.

In November 2014 the Ministry of Defence announced the creation of six new RAuxAF units: No 502 Squadron to be based at RAF Aldergrove, No. 505 Squadron to be based at RAF St Mawgan in Cornwall, No. 605 Squadron to be based at RAF Cosford in Shropshire, No. 607 Squadron to be based at RAF Leeming, No. 611 Squadron to be based at RAF Woodvale near Formby, Merseyside and No. 614 Squadron to be based in Cardiff.

In August 2016, it was announced that RAuxAF personnel will no longer wear identifying Auxiliary insignia on Parade and Mess Dress. The wearing of such on working dress was discontinued earlier in the 2000s.

On 1 April 2019, No 616 (South Yorkshire) Squadron was re-formed at RAF Waddington.

== Structure ==
=== Current RAuxAF Units ===
RAuxAF squadron locations in the United Kingdom

None of the squadrons listed below are flying units with their own allocated aircraft.

- No. 3 Tactical Police Squadron (RAF Honington)
- No. 6 Cyber Reserve Squadron (RAF Digby)
- No. 501 (County of Gloucester) Squadron RAuxAF (RAF Brize Norton)
- No. 502 (Ulster) Squadron RAuxAF (Aldergrove Flying Station)
- No. 504 (County of Nottingham) Squadron RAuxAF (RAF Wittering)
- No. 505 (Wessex) Squadron RAuxAF (RAF St Mawgan)
- No. 600 (City of London) Squadron RAuxAF (RAF Northolt)
- No. 601 (County of London) Squadron (RAF Northolt)
- No. 602 (City of Glasgow) Squadron RAuxAF (Glasgow)
- No. 603 (City of Edinburgh) Squadron RAuxAF (Edinburgh)
- No. 605 (County of Warwick) Squadron RAuxAF (RAF Cosford)
- No. 606 (Chilterns) Squadron RAuxAF (RAF Benson)
- No. 607 (County of Durham) Squadron RAuxAF (RAF Leeming)
- No. 609 (West Riding) Squadron RAuxAF (RAF Leeming)
- No. 611 (West Lancashire) Squadron RAuxAF (RAF Woodvale)
- No. 612 (County of Aberdeen) Squadron RAuxAF (Leuchars Station)
- No. 614 (County of Glamorgan) Squadron RAuxAF (Cardiff)
- No. 616 (South Yorkshire) Squadron RAuxAF (RAF Waddington)
- No. 622 Squadron RAuxAF (Reserve Aircrew) (RAF Brize Norton)
- No. 4624 (County of Oxford) Movements Squadron RAuxAF (RAF Brize Norton)
- No. 4626 (County of Wiltshire) Aeromedical Evacuation Squadron RAuxAF (RAF Brize Norton)
- No. 7006 (VR) Intelligence Squadron RAuxAF (RAF Waddington)
- No. 7010 (VR) Photographic Interpretation Squadron RAuxAF (RAF Waddington)
- No. 7630 (VR) Intelligence Squadron RAuxAF (RAF Waddington)
- No. 7644 (VR) Media Ops Squadron RAuxAF (RAF Halton)
- No. 2503 (City of Lincoln) Squadron RAuxAF Regiment (RAF Waddington)
- No. 2620 (County of Norfolk) Squadron RAuxAF Regiment (RAF Marham)
- No. 2622 (Highland) Squadron RAuxAF Regiment (RAF Lossiemouth)
- No. 2623 (East Anglian) Squadron RAuXAF Regiment (RAF Honington)
- No. 2624 (County of Oxfordshire) Squadron RAuxAF Regiment (RAF Brize Norton)
- RAuxAF Band (Royal Air Force College Cranwell)

== Former Squadrons and Units ==
=== RAuxAF Flying Squadrons formed 1925–1939 and 1947–1957 ===
- No. 500 (County of Kent) Squadron
- No. 501 (County of Gloucester) Squadron
- No. 502 (Ulster) Squadron
- No. 503 (County of Lincoln) Squadron (disbanded 1 November 1938 – not reformed postwar)
- No. 504 (County of Nottingham) Squadron
- No. 600 (City of London) Squadron (Reformed from Nos 1 & 3 MHUs 1999)
- No. 601 (County of London) Squadron (Reformed 2017)
- No. 602 (City of Glasgow) Squadron
- No. 603 (City of Edinburgh) Squadron (Reformed from No 2 MHU 1999)
- No. 604 (County of Middlesex) Squadron
- No. 605 (County of Warwick) Squadron
- No. 607 (County of Durham) Squadron
- No. 608 (North Riding) Squadron (originally 'County of York')
- No. 609 (West Riding) Squadron
- No. 610 (County of Chester) Squadron
- No. 611 (West Lancashire) Squadron
- No. 612 (County of Aberdeen) Squadron
- No. 613 (City of Manchester) Squadron
- No. 614 (County of Glamorgan) Squadron
- No. 615 (County of Surrey) Squadron
- No. 616 (South Yorkshire) Squadron
- No. 622 (Transport) Squadron

=== Air Observation Post Flying Squadrons formed in 1949 ===
- No. 661 (AOP) Squadron RAuxAF
- No. 662 (AOP) Squadron RAuxAF
- No. 663 (AOP) Squadron RAuxAF
- No. 664 (AOP) Squadron RAuxAF
- No. 666 (AOP) Squadron RAuxAF

==== The Fighter Control Units ====
With the advent of the atomic age, there was a need to relocate most of the radar stations on the east and south coast underground and introduce into service more advanced radars. However, manning difficulties in the immediate post-war regular RAF led to a number of Fighter Control and Radar Reporting units of the RAuxAF being formed, from 1948 onwards. In the early and uncertain days of the Cold War, the Fighter Control and Radar Reporting units were largely responsible for manning the entire UK Control and Reporting system. All were disbanded by 1961. They were:

- 3500 (County of Kent)
- 3501 (County of Nottingham)
- 3502 (County of Antrim – later Ulster)
- 3505 (East Riding of Yorkshire)
- 3506 (County of Northampton)
- 3507 (County of Somerset)
- 3508 (County of Northumberland)
- 3509 (County of Stafford)
- 3510 (County of Inverness)
- 3511 (City of Dundee)
- 3512 (County of Devon)
- 3513 (City of Plymouth)
- 3602 (City of Glasgow)
- 3603 (City of Edinburgh)
- 3604 (County of Middlesex)
- 3605 (County of Warwick)
- 3608 (North Riding of Yorkshire)
- 3609 (West Riding of Yorkshire)
- 3611 (West Lancashire)
- 3612 (County of Aberdeen)
- 3613 (City of Manchester)
- 3614 (County of Glamorgan)
- 3617 (County of Hampshire)
- 3618 (County of Sussex)
- 3619 (county of Suffolk)
- 3620 (County of Norfolk)
- 3621 (North Lancashire)
- 3631 (County of Essex)

Radar Reporting Units

- 3700 (County of London)
- 3701 (County of Sussex)

=== The Regiment Squadrons ===
In 1948, 20 RAuxAF Regiment Squadrons were proposed. In the event, 12 were formed in the Light Anti-Aircraft role, equipped with 40mm anti-aircraft guns and attached to the RAuxAF flying squadrons. By 1955, due to the introduction into service of more sophisticated weapons, the squadrons were converted to Regiment Field Squadrons. All 12 squadrons were disbanded, along with the flying squadrons, in 1957. However, three new field squadrons were re-formed in 1979, followed by two more in 1982 and a sixth in 1983. Since then, two have been disbanded and two have been re-roled. In addition, No 1339 Wing was formed in 1985 and consisted of 2729 and 2890 (both City of Lincoln Squadrons) equipped with Skyguard Radar and Oerlikon guns both captured from the Argentinians during the 1982 Falklands War Both squadrons were disbanded in 1994 to become the Rapier Cadreisation Unit and then No 27 and 48 Squadrons RAF Regiment.

- 2501 (County of Gloucester)
- 2502 (Ulster)
- 2503 (County of Lincoln)*
- 2504 (County of Nottingham)
- 2600 (City of London)
- 2602 (City of Glasgow)
- 2603 (City of Edinburgh
- 2605 (County of Warwick)
- 2608 (North Riding of Yorkshire)
- 2609 (West Riding of Yorkshire)
- 2611 (West Lancashire)
- 2612 (County of Aberdeen)
- 2620 (County of Norfolk)*
- 2622 (Highland)*
- 2623 (East Anglian)*
- 2625 (County of Cornwall)
- 2729 (City of Lincoln)
- 2890 (City of Lincoln)

* denotes current active squadrons

Regiment Squadrons took the number of their parent flying squadron, prefixed with 2. Fighter Control Units were nominally attached likewise and their numbers were prefixed with 3, although they were not necessarily formally attached to any particular flying squadron, not being based at any airfield.

=== Airfield Defence Force Flights 1986–1994 ===
- RAF Brampton
- RAF High Wycombe
- RAF St Athan

and

- RAF Lyneham – members of the Defence Force served the Royal Air Force at Lyneham for eight years between 1986 and 1994.

A localised recruiting drive began in the summer of 1986. At the time, the Cold War was still in progress and the Soviet Union was regarded as a considerable threat to UK bases. So a plan was created to develop a system of ground defence for the vital bases without extending regular forces and for a modest outlay. As the Royal Auxiliary Air Force had already been revived in 1979 to provide aeromedical evacuation services, air movements and Regiment Field squadrons, it was planned to set up the Defence Force flights and task one of them to protect RAF Lyneham, home of the UK's air transport squadrons.

Volunteers between 18 and 50 were sought within a radius of 50 miles (80 km) of Lyneham and the first training flight came into being in late 1986, under the command of Flt Lt Bryan Tovey, a retired RAF Squadron Leader. Within five years, over 100 volunteers attended Lyneham on Wednesday evenings and weekends, trained in all the essential field combat skills such as weapons handling and live-firing practice, fieldcraft, perimeter defence, fighting in built up areas, reconnaissance, intelligence-gathering, fire-fighting and rescue techniques plus nuclear, biological and chemical monitoring. Battlefield skills were regularly tested at military training areas and such was the reputation built-up by the Lyneham Defence Force that their personnel were once used to assist regular special forces in training scenarios. The Defence Force field sections and Combined Incident Teams were based with the RAF Regiment contingent at Lyneham and played a full part in the station's Tactical Evaluation tests, conducted by NATO examiners. In the final TacEval before the Defence Force was stood down, Lyneham received outstanding marks and its Station Commander particularly thanked the Auxiliaries for their contribution. Such performance did not go unnoticed in the wider air force and in 1993, the Lyneham DF was awarded the Robins Trophy as the outstanding RAuxAF unit of the year. The trophy was presented by the RAuxAF Inspector General at a ceremony at Lyneham in 1994.

=== The Women's Auxiliary Air Force (WAAF) ===
The foundations of the Women's Auxiliary Air Force were laid by the Women's Royal Air Force (WRAF) which was formed early in 1918, but, although plans were formulated for the continual employment of women with the RAF in peacetime, they had to be abandoned on account of the drastic post-war economy and by April 1920, the disbandment of the WRAF was complete.

When the Auxiliary Territorial Service (ATS) came into being in September 1938, it contained separate RAF companies, but following the Munich crisis of 1938, it became apparent that these companies should be brought more closely under RAF control. Accordingly, the Women's Auxiliary Air Force (WAAF) was constituted by Royal Warrant on 28 June 1939.

Initially, recruiting was limited to officers and NCOs only, recruiting for the original RAF companies being undertaken by the AAF. However, with the coming of the Second World War, airwomen were to join the ranks and, by mid 1943, there were 182,000 women serving in the WAAF, in all the RAF trade groups. In common with the AAF, the women's force became less 'auxiliary' as the war went on; but on the outbreak of war, the WAAF consisted of 234 officers and 1500 airwomen, all of whom could be considered pre-war volunteers in the true auxiliary mould.

Initially, entry was confined to the few service trades then open to women, namely MT Driver, Equipment Assistant, Cook, Clerk and Mess and Kitchen Staff. A small number of fabric workers were also employed. By August 1939, additional trades were authorised: Teleprinter Operators, Telephone Operators and Plotters.

== See also ==
- Royal Air Force Volunteer Reserve
- Reserve Forces and Cadets Association
- RAF Balloon Command

== Bibliography ==
- Halley, James J. The Squadrons of the Royal Air Force. Tonbridge, Kent, UK: Air Britain (Historians) Ltd., 1980. ISBN 0-85130-083-9.
- Halley, James J. The Squadrons of the Royal Air Force & Commonwealth, 1981–1988. Tonbridge, Kent, UK: Air Britain (Historians) Ltd., 1988. ISBN 0-85130-164-9.
- Hunt, Leslie. Twenty-one Squadrons: History of the Royal Auxiliary Air Force, 1925–57. London: Garnstone Press, 1972. ISBN 0-85511-110-0. (New edition in 1992 by Crécy Publishing, ISBN 0-947554-26-2.)
- Jefford, C.G. RAF Squadrons, a Comprehensive Record of the Movement and Equipment of all RAF Squadrons and their Antecedents since 1912. Shrewsbury, UK: Airlife Publishing Ltd., 1998 (second edition 2001). ISBN 1-84037-141-2.
- Moyes, Philip J.R. Bomber Squadrons of the RAF and their Aircraft. London: Macdonald and Jane's (Publishers) Ltd., 1964 (Second edition 1976). ISBN 0-354-01027-1.
- Rawlings, John D.R. Fighter Squadrons of the RAF and their Aircraft. London: Macdonald and Jane's (Publishers) Ltd., 1969 (Second edition 1976). ISBN 0-354-01028-X.
