= No. 7010 Squadron RAuxAF =

No. 7010 (VR) Photographic Interpretation Squadron, RAuxAF
- Active: 1953 - present
- Country: United Kingdom
- Branch: Royal Air Force
- Role: Imagery Analysis
- Garrison/HQ: RAF Waddington
- Motto: Vocati Veniemus ("When summoned we shall be there")

Commanders
- Honorary Air Commodore: Paul Rimmer, CBE

No. 7010 (Voluntary Reserve) Intelligence Squadron, Royal Auxiliary Air Force is a unit of the British Royal Air Force. It was founded in April 1953 as No. 7010 Flight, Royal Air Force Volunteer Reserve, to provide strategic imagery analysis support to the Royal Air Force. In 1965 the flight expanded its role to include tactical imagery analysis. In August 1982, Her Majesty The Queen approved the issue of a badge to the flight. In allusion to the unit's role, the emblem of a human eye is portrayed with a wing embellishment and set in front of a roundel. The motto Vocati Veniemus may be freely translated as "when summoned we shall be there". The collapse of the Warsaw Pact resulted in a large reduction of NATO forces in central Europe. In turn this has led to a major reduction in, and reorganisation of, the United Kingdom's regular and reserve forces. Within this overall plan for defence, No. 7010 Flight became No. 7010 (VR) Photographic Interpretation Squadron. It was later renamed No. 7010 (Volutnary Reserve) Intelligence Squadron.

== Mission statement ==
To recruit and train a reserve cadre of operational imagery analysts capable of the processing and exploitation of all source imagery whenever and wherever it is needed, augmenting and working with the regular Royal Air Force to achieve a shared purpose.

== Organisation ==
No. 7010 (VR) Squadron is administered from Headquarters Intelligence Reserves, RAF Waddington, Lincolnshire. Squadron personnel are assigned to support two units: the Defence Geospatial Intelligence Fusion Centre (DGIFC) at RAF Wyton in Cambridgeshire, and No. 1 Intelligence, Surveillance, and Reconnaissance Wing RAF (1 ISR Wg) also at RAF Waddington.
