= No. 7006 Squadron RAuxAF =

No. 7006 Flight RAFVR No. 7006 (Volunteer Reserves) Squadron RAuxAF
- Active: 1986–Present
- Country: United Kingdom
- Branch: Royal Air Force
- Role: Intelligence Gather and Analysing
- Size: Squadron
- Part of: Intelligence Reserve Wing
- Squadron HQ: RAF Waddington
- Mottos: (Latin): Florebo Quocumque Ferar (English): I will flower everywhere I am planted
- Engagements: Op Granby; Op Grapple; Op Telic; Op Herrick; Op Olympics
- Website: 7006 SQUADRON RAUXAF

Commanders
- Honorary Air Commodore: Lady Moira Andrews

No. 7006 Intelligence Squadron RAuxAF is a specialist intelligence unit of the Royal Air Force's reserve component, the Royal Auxiliary Air Force. Since 1997, the squadron has been the only dedicated reserve intelligence squadron in the RAF.

== Formation ==
In 1986, No. 7006 (Intelligence) Flight RAF was formed at RAF High Wycombe as a dedicated Royal Air Force Volunteer Reserve intelligence unit. The flight's initial role was to provide linguists tailored to the needs of the Cold War. At the time of formation, the new flight sat under Headquarters, RAF Volunteer Reserves along with Nos. 7010, 7630, and 7644 flights.

During the Gulf War, the flight deployed alongside 7644 (Public Relations) Flight, and 4624 (Movements) and 4626 (Aeromedical Evacuation) Squadrons.

In 1997, following the Front Line First reform, the Royal Air Force Volunteer Reserve was merged into the Royal Auxiliary Air Force, and the flight expanded to form No. 7006 Squadron RAuxAF. Sometime by 2021, the squadron was moved under command of the new Intelligence Reserve Wing sitting under No. 2 Group RAF, today based at RAF Waddington. In 2016, the squadron was based at RAF Cranwell

Today the squadron is based at RAF Waddington, with personnel serving at RAF Wyton, RAF High Wycombe, and RAF Digby. The squadron today is one of only three units providing intelligence support to the regular RAF. The squadron's title has also changed to become No. 7006 (Volunteer Reserves) Intelligence Squadron RAuxAF.
