= RAF Waddington =

Royal Air Force main operating base in Lincolnshire, England

RAF Waddington
- Near Waddington, Lincolnshire in England
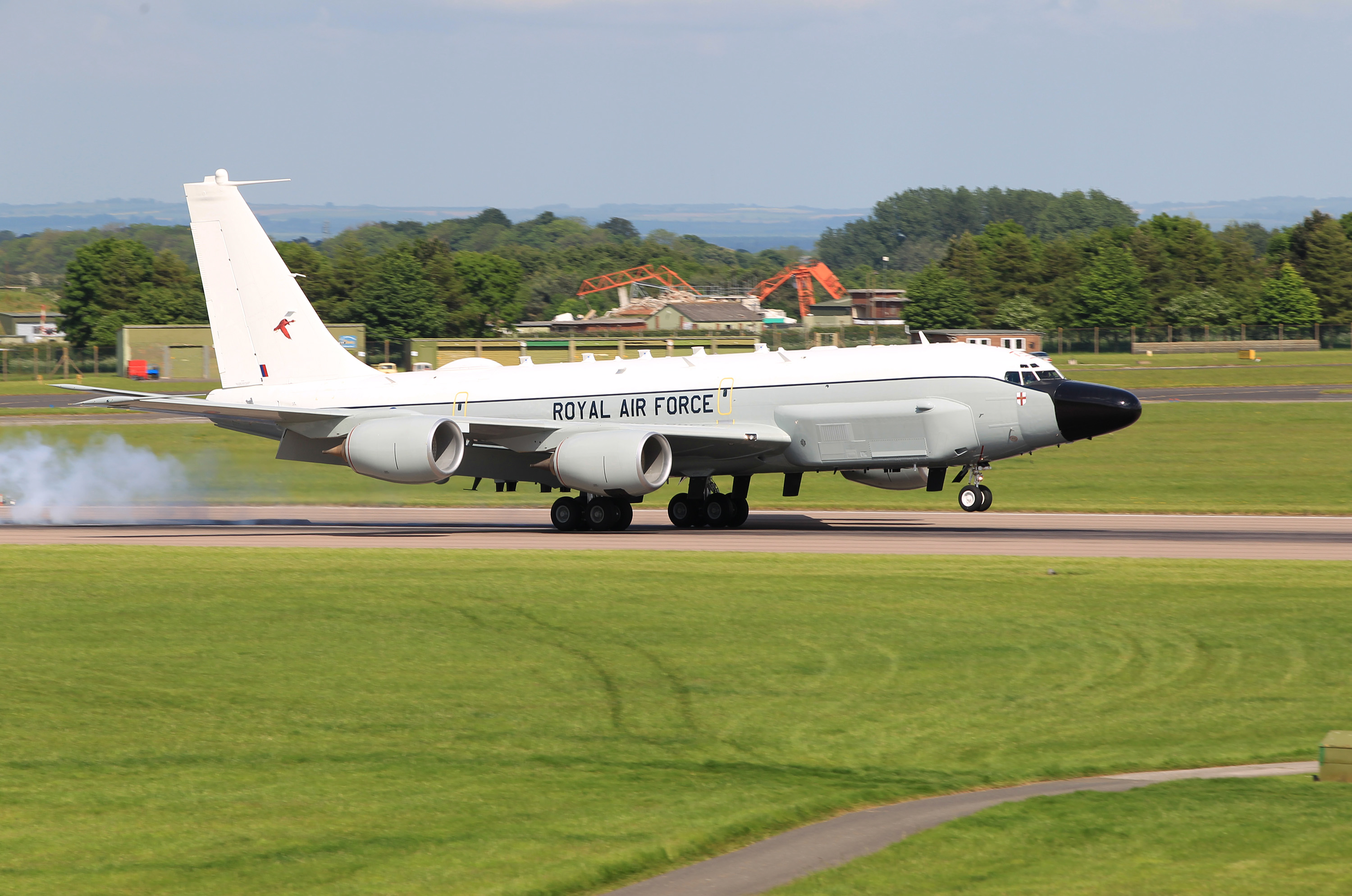
- The RAF's first Boeing RC-135W Rivet Joint arrives at RAF Waddington in November 2013

- For Faith and Freedom

Site information
- Type: Main operating base
- Owner: Ministry of Defence
- Operator: Royal Air Force
- Controlled by: No. 1 Group (Air Combat)
- Condition: Operational
- Website: Official website

Location
- Shown within Lincolnshire
- Coordinates: 53°10′21″N 0°31′51″W
- Grid reference: SK985645
- Area: 391 hectares (970 acres)

Site history
- Built: 1916; 110 years ago
- In use: 1916–1920; 1937 – present

Garrison information
- Current commander: Group Captain Dominic Holland
- Occupants: No. 13 Squadron; No. 14 Squadron; No. 51 Squadron; No. 54 Squadron; No. 56 Squadron; No. 92 Squadron; See Based units section for full list.

Airfield information
- Identifiers: IATA: WTN, ICAO: EGXW, WMO: 03377
- Elevation: 230 feet (70 m) AMSL
Runways
| Direction | Length and surface |
|---|---|
| 02/20 | 2,939 metres (9,642 ft) blacktop asphalt |
- Source: RAF Waddington Defence Aerodrome Manual

Royal Air Force Waddington (IATA: WTN, ICAO: EGXW), commonly known as RAF Waddington, and informally known by its nickname 'Waddo' is a Royal Air Force station located beside the village of Waddington, 4.2 miles (6.8 kilometres) south of Lincoln, Lincolnshire, in England.

The station is the RAF's Intelligence Surveillance Target Acquisition and Reconnaissance (ISTAR) hub. It is home to a fleet of aircraft composed of the Beechcraft Shadow R1, Boeing RC-135W Rivet Joint, and General Atomics MQ-9 Reaper remotely piloted aircraft. Since October 2022, it has also been home to the RAF's Aerobatic Team the Red Arrows.

== History ==
=== First World War ===
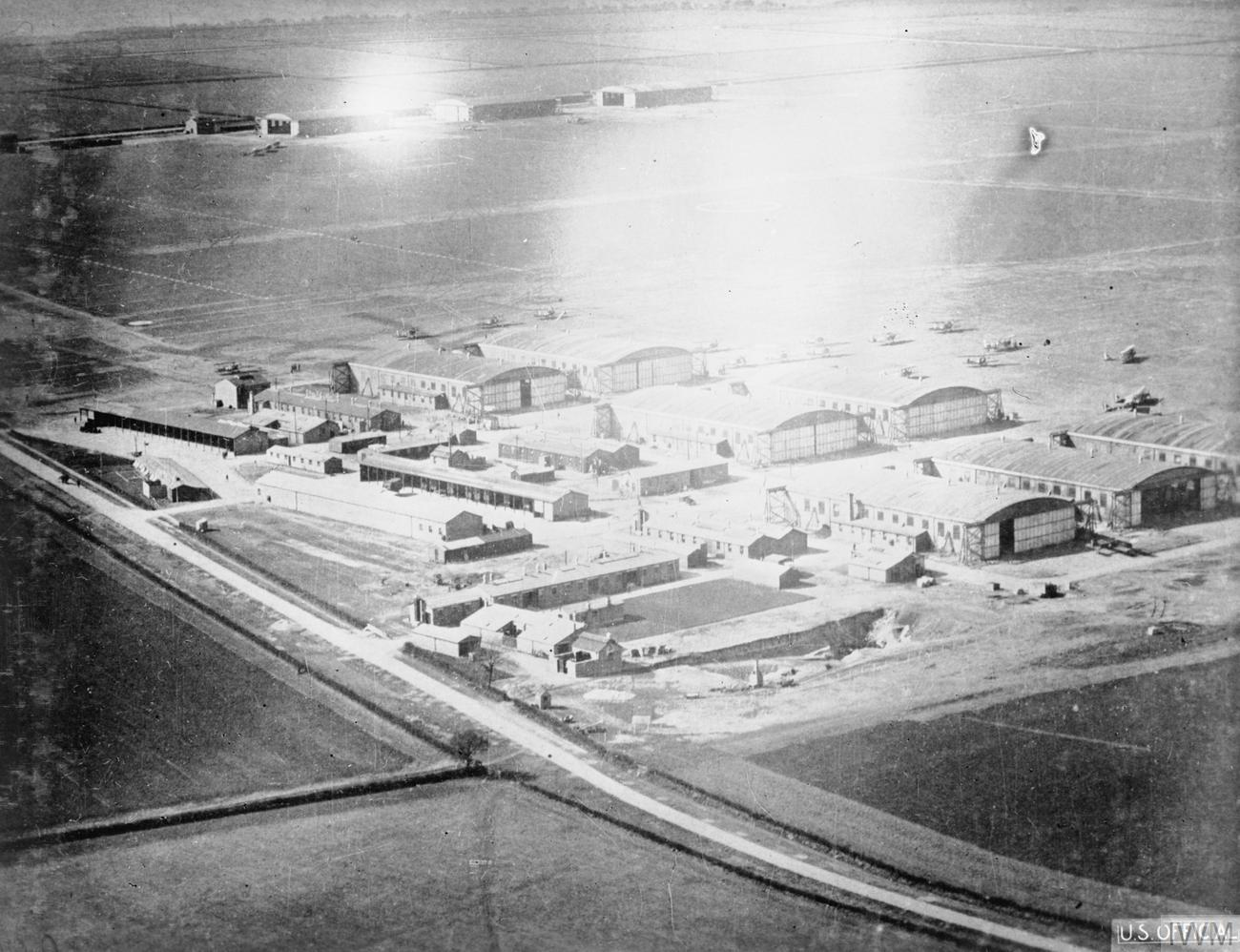
RFC Waddington training station.

Waddington station opened as a Royal Flying Corps flying training aerodrome in 1916. Student pilots, including members of the US Army, were taught to fly a variety of aircraft. The station came under the control of the Royal Air Force (RAF) when it was created on 1 April 1918. It operated until 1920, when the station went into care and maintenance.

During and after the First World War, the following squadrons operated from Waddington.

- No. 82 Squadron RFC between 30 March 1917 and 17 November 1917, using the Armstrong Whitworth F.K.8, before moving to Saint-Omer in France.
- No. 97 Squadron RFC between 1 December 1917 and 21 January 1918, with no aircraft, before moving to Stonehenge Aerodrome, in Wiltshire.
- No. 105 Squadron RFC formed at the airfield on 23 September 1917, flying various aircraft and stayed until 3 October 1917 when it moved to Andover in Hampshire.
- No. 117 Squadron RFC formed at Waddington on 1 January 1918, flying various aircraft and stayed until 3 April 1918 when the squadron moved to Hucknall in Nottinghamshire.
- No. 123 Squadron RFC formed at the airfield on 1 February 1918 and flew various aircraft before moving to Duxford in Cambridgeshire on 1 March 1918.
- No. 23 Squadron RAF between 15 March 1919 and 31 December 1919 with no aircraft before being disbanded.
- No. 203 Squadron RAF between 27 March 1919 and December 1919 with no aircraft as a cadre before moving to RAF Scopwick, also in Lincolnshire.
- No. 204 Squadron RAF from 11 February 1919 as a cadre with no aircraft until 31 December 1919 when the squadron disbanded.

=== Interwar period ===
As part of the pre-war expansion programme, the Waddington site was earmarked for development into a fully equipped heavy bomber station. It reopened as a bomber base on 12 March 1937, with No. 50 Squadron arriving on the same day with their Hawker Hinds and then adding the Handley Page Hampden. No. 110 Squadron arrived 15 days later, initially with the Hind before switching to the Bristol Blenheim. On 7 June 1937, No. 88 Squadron reformed at Waddington with the Hind before moving to RAF Boscombe Down in Wiltshire on 17 July 1937. On 16 June 1937, No. 44 Squadron moved in from RAF Andover, flying the Blenheim, before switching to the Avro Anson and the Hampden in February 1939. In May 1939, No. 110 Squadron left for RAF Wattisham in Suffolk. No. 50 Squadron left the following year, being moved to RAF Lindholme in South Yorkshire.

=== Second World War ===
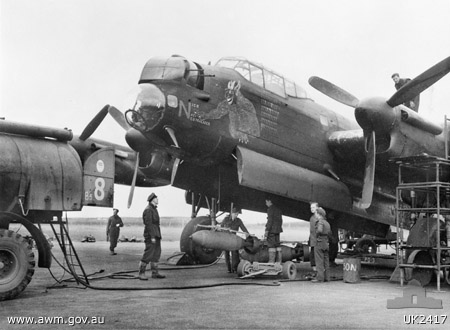
An Avro Lancaster of No. 463 Squadron RAAF at RAF Waddington in 1944. It completed sixty seven missions and twice returned safely with half the tail plane shot away.

RAF Waddington began the Second World War housing the Hampdens of No. 44 Squadron and No. 50 Squadron. Both squadrons were in action on the same day as Britain's war declaration, attacking German naval targets at Kiel. Waddington squadrons were also involved during the critical stages of the late summer and early autumn of 1940, attacking barges in the channel ports which were being assembled as part of the invasion fleet.

In November 1940, it was the first station to receive the Avro Manchester heavy bomber.

No. 44 Squadron RAF was the first in RAF Bomber Command to fly operationally with the Avro Lancaster on 2 March 1942 from Waddington. BT308, the first prototype Lancaster (or Mk.III Manchester), arrived at Waddington in September 1941 for flight tests. Like RAF Scampton, the station was part of 5 Group.

On 17 April 1942, seven Lancasters of No. 44 Squadron took off from Waddington as part of Operation Margin, a bombing raid on the MAN U-boat engine plant in Augsburg in Germany. The squadron subsequently left Waddington on 31 May 1943, moving to RAF Dunholme Lodge, also in Lincolnshire.

During the Second World War the following squadrons are known to have operated from Waddington.

- No. 97 Squadron reformed on 25 February 1941, with the Avro Manchester before moving to nearby RAF Coningsby on 10 March 1941.
- No. 9 Squadron arrived on 7 August 1942, initially with the Vickers Wellington III, before switching to the Lancaster I and III during September 1942. The squadron moved to RAF Bardney, also in Lincolnshire, on 14 April 1943.

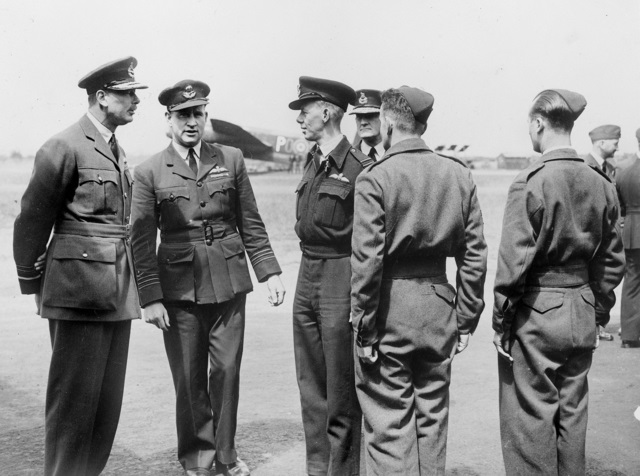
During his visit to RAF Waddington in June 1944, Prince Henry, Duke of Gloucester, meets the crews of No. 467 Squadron RAAF.

- No. 142 Squadron was present between 15 June 1940 and 3 July 1940 with the Fairey Battle before moving to RAF Binbrook, also in Lincolnshire.
- No. 207 Squadron reformed at Waddington on 1 November 1940 with the Manchester, adding the Hampden for a month in July 41. The squadron moved to RAF Bottesford on 17 November 1941
- No. 420 Squadron of the Royal Canadian Air Force (RCAF) formed on 19 December 1941 with the Hampden before moving to RAF Skipton-on-Swale in North Yorkshire on 7 August 1942.
- No. 463 Squadron of the Royal Australian Air Force (RAAF) formed at the airfield on 25 November 1943 with the Lancaster I and III before moving to RAF Skellingthorpe in Lincoln on 3 July 1945.
- No. 467 Sqn RAAF was present between 13 November 1943 and 15 June 1945 with the Lancaster Mks I and III. The squadron then moved to nearby RAF Metheringham.
- No. 617 Squadron was present between 17 June 1945 and 19 January 1946 with the Lancaster VII-FE before moving to RAF Digri in Pakistan.

In May 1975, some of the former Australian aircrew returned to the base.

=== Cold War ===
During the Cold War, RAF Waddington became an Avro Vulcan V-bomber station, with No. 83 Squadron being the first in the RAF to receive the Vulcan in May 1957. It continued in this role until 1984, when the last Vulcan squadron, No. 50 Squadron, disbanded. From 1968, the UK nuclear deterrent was transferred to Polaris submarines, beginning with HMS Resolution (S22).

In August 1960, the station developed the 'sudsmobile' technique to lay a 1,000 by 30 yards (914 by 27 metres) carpet of foam in around a half-hour for a wheels-up landing. Previously it had taken around three hours to lay a foam carpet on the runway. An English Electric Canberra from RAF Wyton landed wheels-up on 23 August 1960, with a Handley Page Victor managing the same on 5 December 1960.

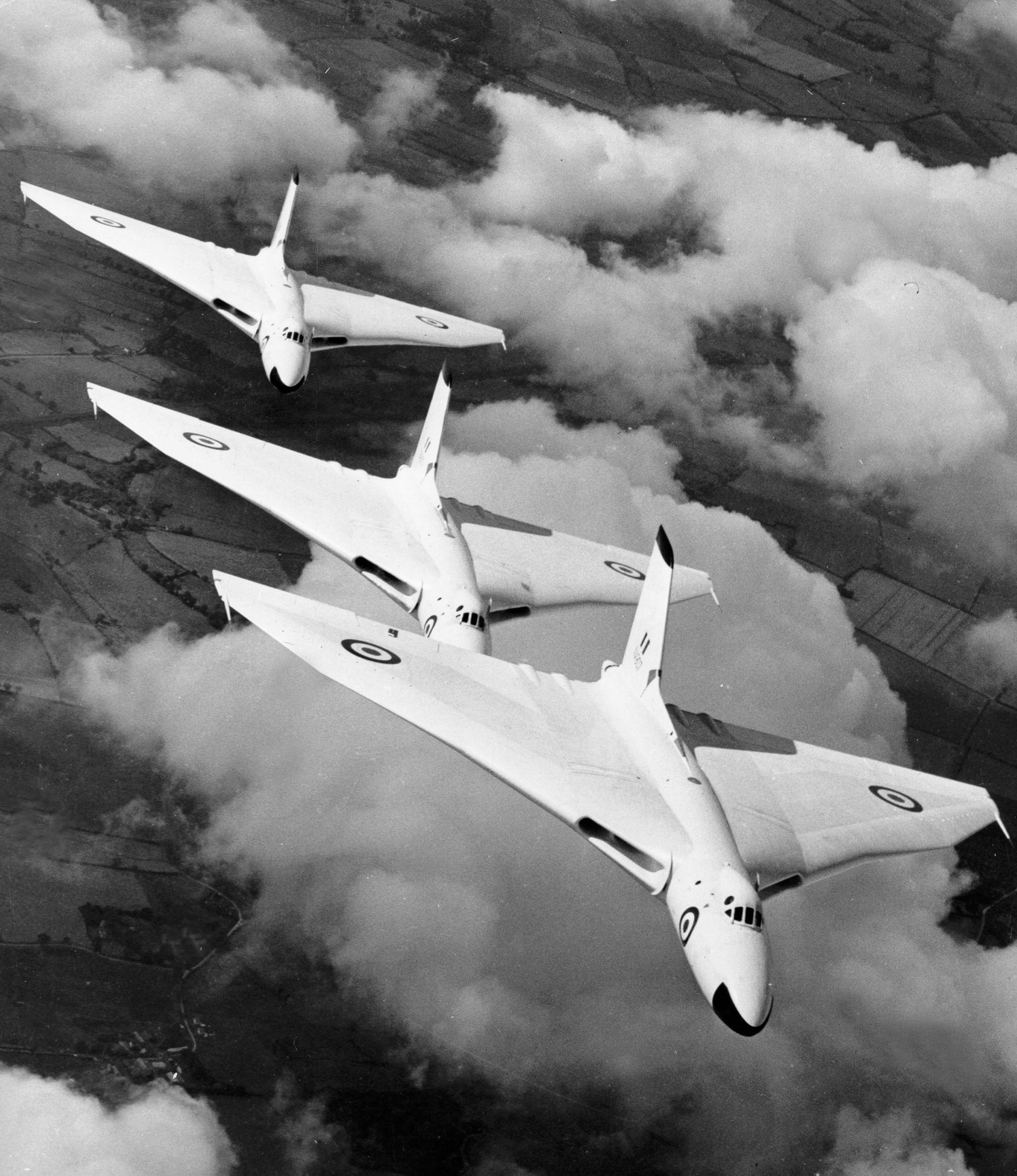
Avro Vulcan bombers from RAF Waddington flying in formation in 1957.

The fiftieth anniversary of the Royal Air Force was celebrated at the base on 1 April 1968, mainly because the RAF's last flying Lancaster was based at the airfield from the mid-1960s.

During the Cold War the following squadrons are known to have operated from Waddington.

- No. 9 Squadron operating the Avro Vulcan B.2 between 1975 and April 1982 when they were disbanded, later reforming at RAF Honington in Suffolk as the first operational Panavia Tornado GR1 squadron.
- No. 12 Squadron between 26 July 1946 and 18 September 1946, initially with the Lancaster I and III before swapping to the Avro Lincoln B.2 and moving to RAF Binbrook.
- No. 21 Squadron and No. 27 Squadron, which were both present from 26 May 1955 until 31 December 1957 with the English Electric Canberra B.2 before being disbanded.
- No. 44 Squadron between 10 August 1960 and 21 December 1982 when they were disbanded; the squadron operated the Avro Vulcan B.1 and B.2.
- No. 50 Squadron were based at Waddington from 26 January 1946 with the Lincoln B.2 before being disbanded on 31 January 1951. It reformed at the airfield on 1 August 1962 and operated the Vulcan B.1, B.2 and B.2K before being disbanded on 31 March 1984.
- No. 57 Squadron between 7 October 1946 and 4 April 1951 with the Lincoln B.2 before moving to RAF Marham in Norfolk, the squadron returned on 4 June 1951 with the Washington B.1 before leaving again on 2 April 1952 to RAF Coningsby.
- No. 61 Squadron starting from 25 January 1946 with the Lancaster I and III before being replaced by the Lincoln B.2. The squadron left on 6 August 1953 moving to RAF Wittering in Cambridgeshire.
- No. 83 Squadron from 21 March 1957 with the Vulcan B.1 before being reduced to a cadre with no aircraft and moving to RAF Scampton on 10 August 1960.
- No. 101 Squadron from 26 June 1961 with the Vulcan B.1 and B.2 before being disbanded on 4 August 1982.

RAF Waddington was home to several USAF Coronet deployments throughout the Cold War:

- Coronet Stallion from 21 August to 12 September 1979 saw the deployment of eighteen LTV A-7D Corsair II from the 124th TFS (Iowa ANG), 174th TFS (South Dakota ANG), and 175th TFS (Iowa ANG).
- Coronet Buffalo from 11 May to 8 June 1985 saw the deployment of thirty-three A-7D Corsair IIs and 3 A-7Ks from the 124th TFS (Iowa ANG), 174th TFS (South Dakota ANG), and 175th TFS (Iowa ANG).
- Coronet East 97 from 3 to 15 June 1991 saw the deployment of twelve A-7D Corsair IIs from the 125th Tactical Fighter Squadron (Ohio ANG).

=== Falklands War ===
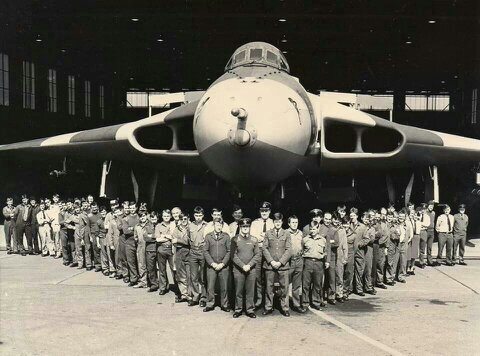
RAF personnel on front of an Avro Vulcan at RAF Waddington prior to the aircraft's deployment to the Falklands.

During the Falklands War, Operation Black Buck saw three aircraft and crews from Waddington take part in a long-range bombing raid on Port Stanley airfield in the Falkland Islands. The three Vulcan B2s, of No. 44 Squadron, No. 50 Squadron, and No. 101 Squadron, were twenty-two years old, and were selected because they had the more powerful Rolls-Royce Olympus 301 engines. A complicated air-to-air refuelling plan, involving fourteen Handley Page Victor K.2 tankers, was developed, which was only contemplated due to the belief of Sir Mike Beetham, then Chief of the Air Staff, who had developed the RAF's in-flight refuelling capability with Vickers Valiants with 214 Squadron at RAF Marham in 1959. Spare parts for the operation were requisitioned from scrapyards in Newark-on-Trent and military museums. The K2 Victor tanker aircraft came from 55 Squadron and 57 Squadron at RAF Marham. Navigation came from the Delco Carousel inertial navigation system.

Later during 1982, there was a female peace camp outside the base for five months.

=== 1990s ===
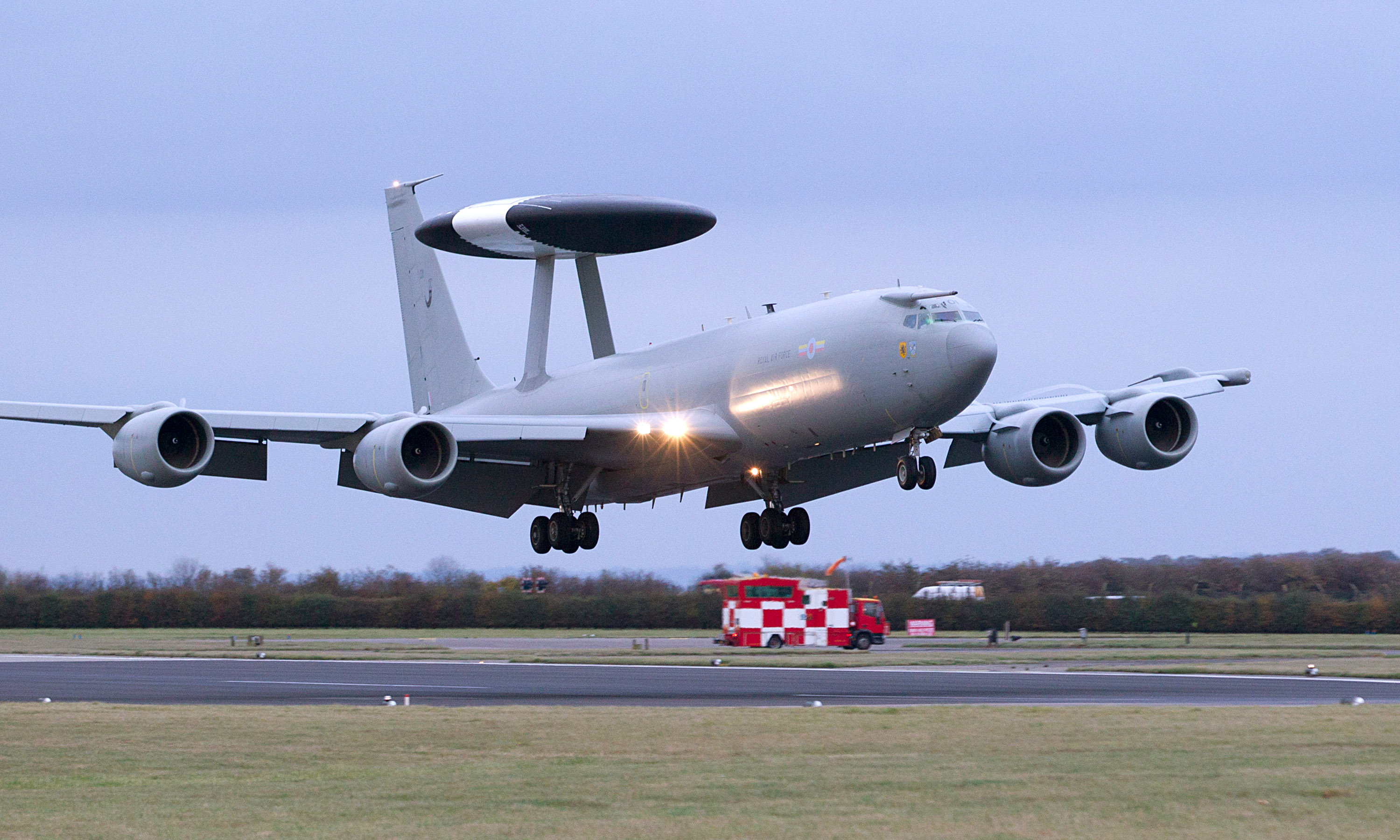
An E-3D Sentry lands at RAF Waddington.

In July 1991, No. 8 Squadron moved to RAF Waddington and re-equipped with Boeing E-3 Sentrys. In 1993, the only RAF Avro Vulcan bomber maintained by RAF Waddington for flying displays, XH558, was retired due to budget restraints to Bruntingthorpe Aerodrome, Leicestershire.

The Electronic Warfare Operational Support Element (EWOSE – now known as the Air Warfare Centre) moved from RAF Wyton to Waddington in March 1995.

In 1998, 26 Squadron RAF Regiment moved to RAF Waddington from RAF Laarbruch in Germany. The squadron was equipped with the Rapier Field standard C short range air defence missile system, and remained at Waddington until its temporary disbandment in 2008.

=== 21st century ===
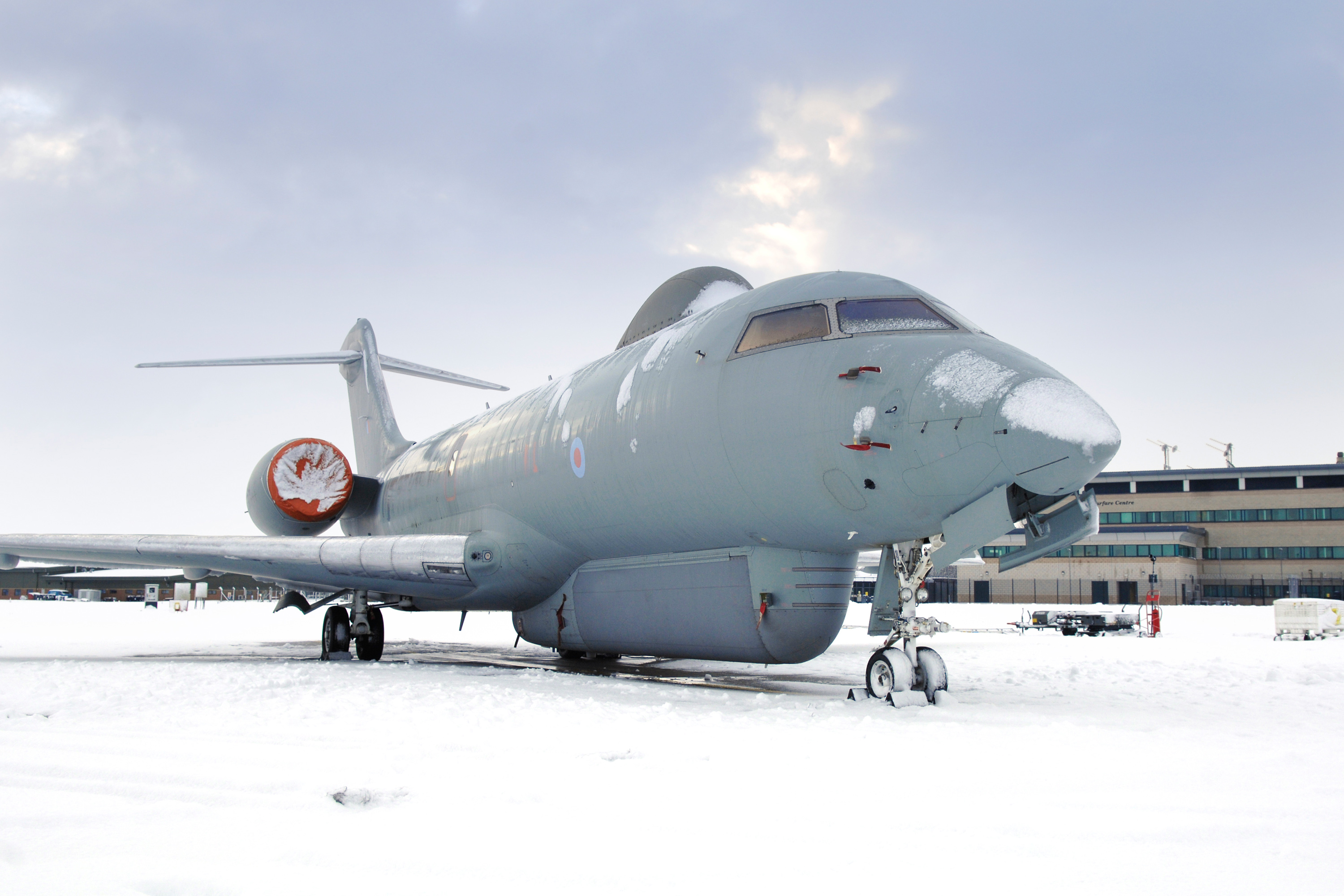
A Raytheon Sentinel R1 of No.5 (AC) Squadron at RAF Waddington after a heavy snowfall during November 2010.

All of the aircraft-operating squadrons based at RAF Waddington were dispersed to other airfields in July 2014 when the runway was closed for rebuilding. The project, valued at £35 million and due to take 12 months, actually took 26 months, and re-opened to aircraft officially in November 2016. The work was expected to increase the operational capability of the runway and airfield by 25 years.

No. 216 Squadron reformed at Waddington on 1 April 2020 as an experimental unit testing future drone swarm technology.

In September 2020, work to convert an existing aircraft hangar into a joint flight simulator training facility was completed. The facility, operated by the Air Battlespace Training Centre, allows simulators at different locations to be linked together, enabling UK and US crews to train with one another in scenarios which would be difficult to recreate in real life.

No. 5 (Army Co-operation) Squadron was disbanded in March 2021 when the Sentinel R1 was withdrawn from service. The E-3D Sentry was also retired in 2021, with No. 8 Squadron subsequently relocating to RAF Lossiemouth to re-equip with the Wedgetail AEW1.

In August 2022, No. 39 Squadron disbanded, with a MQ-9A Reaper ground control system returning from Creech Air Force Base in Nevada to Waddington for use by No. 13 Squadron, which continued to operate the Reaper.

During early October 2022, the RAF Aerobatic Team; the Red Arrows and its 146 personnel relocated to Waddington from its previous home at RAF Scampton which was scheduled to close.

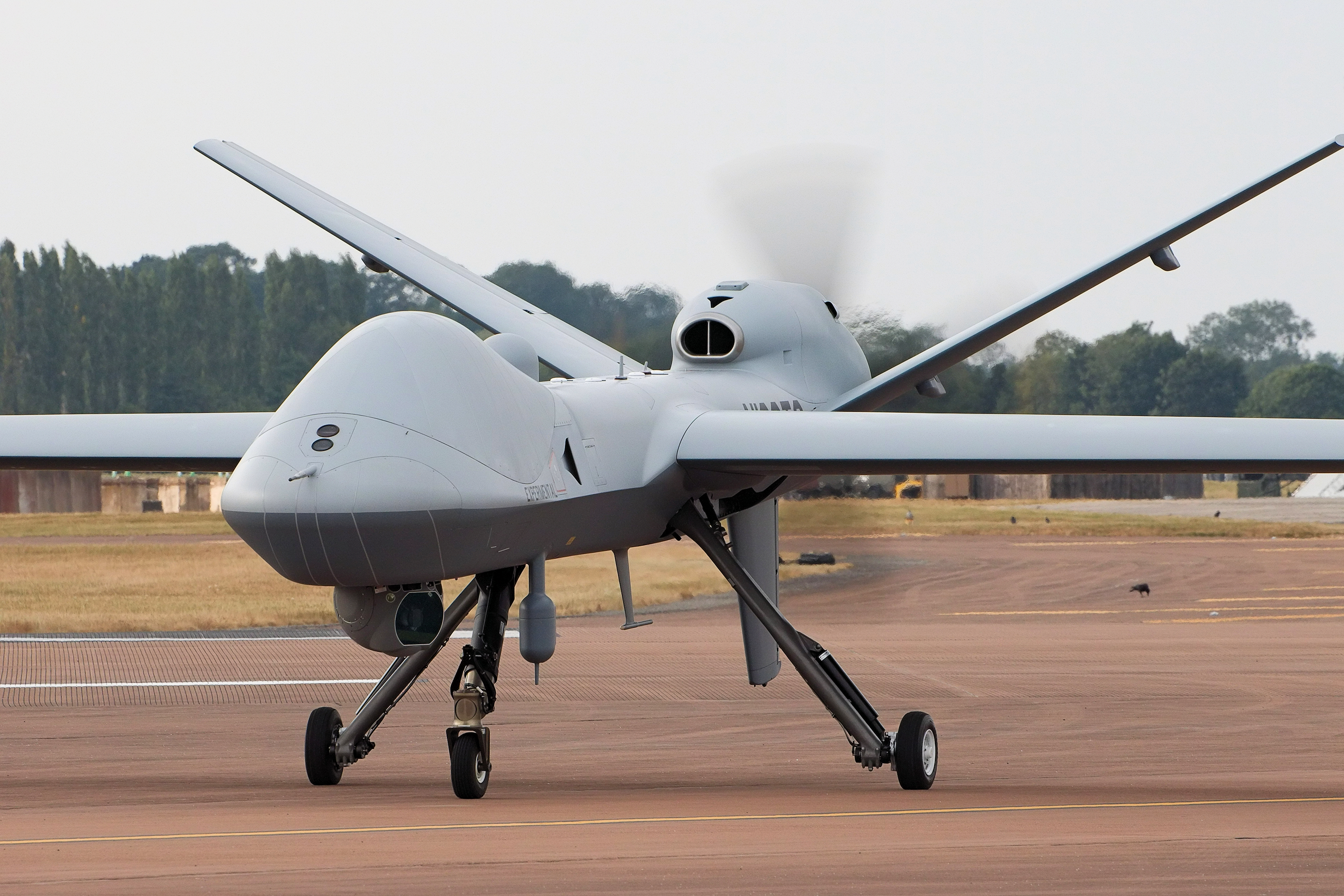
An MQ-9B of the type which is based at RAF Waddington.

No. 31 Squadron was re-formed at Waddington in October 2023, equipped with the General Atomics MQ-9B, a remotely piloted air system which is known as the Protector RG1 in RAF service. A new hangar, support facilities and crew accommodation were constructed at Waddington; in 2018 it was said that the cost of this project would be £93 million.

== Role and operations ==
=== ISTAR ===
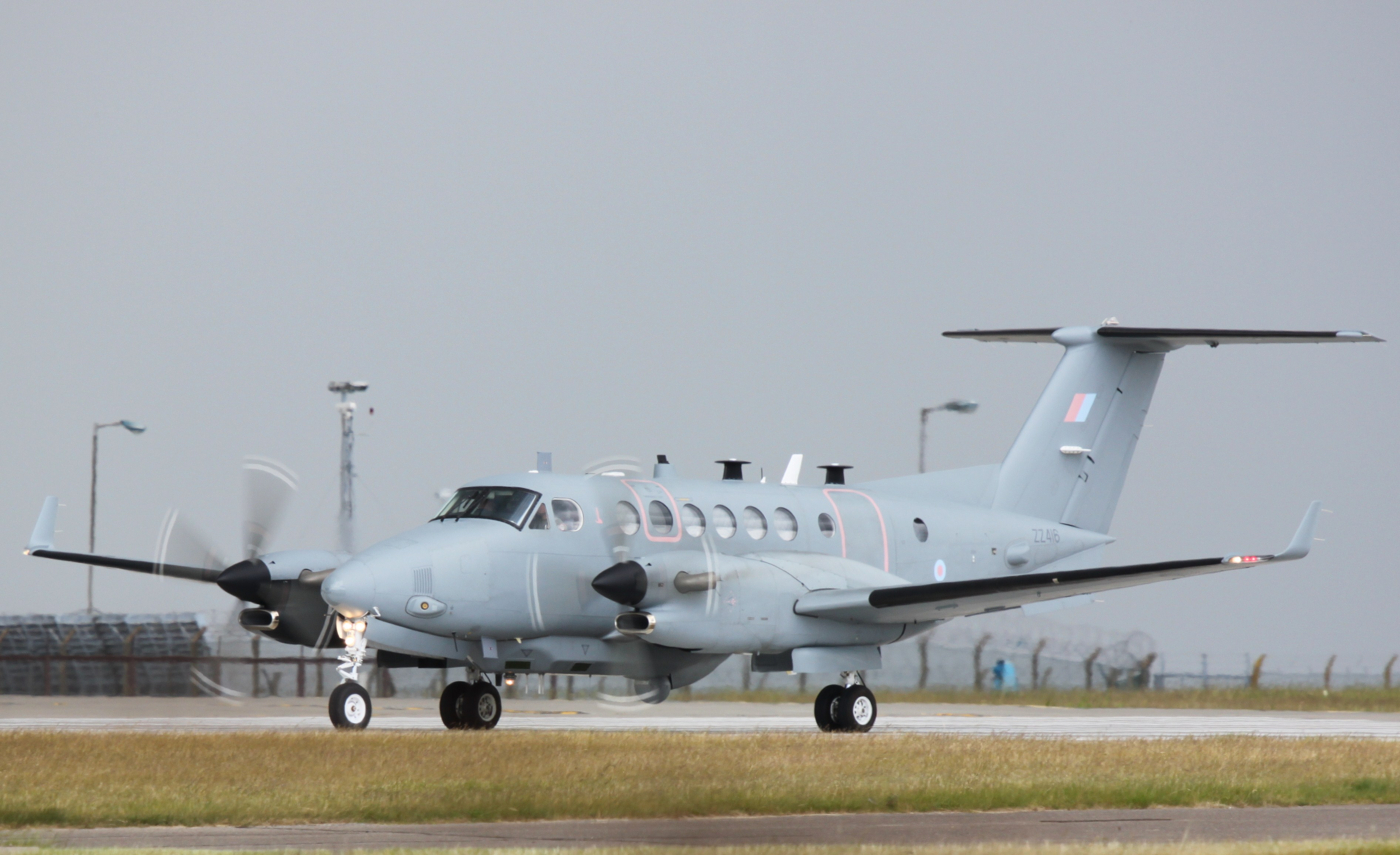
An RAF Shadow R1 based at RAF Waddington.

RAF Waddington is the RAF's Intelligence Surveillance Target Acquisition and Reconnaissance (ISTAR) hub, and is home to a fleet of aircraft composed of Shadow R1 and RC-135W Rivet Joint, and is an operating base for the RAF's MQ-9 Reaper.

No. 1 Intelligence Surveillance Reconnaissance Wing formed on 1 April 2016. It is a mix of the staff and capabilities of the Tactical Imagery Intelligence Wing (TIW) at RAF Marham, No. 54 Signals Unit at RAF Digby, and No. 5 (AC) Squadron. Waddington is home to the wing headquarters.

=== Expeditionary Air Wing ===
Various units and squadrons were combined to form a new deployable air force structure, No. 34 Expeditionary Air Wing (34 EAW), at RAF Waddington on 1 April 2006.

=== Supported units ===
RAF Waddington Voluntary Band is one of seven voluntary bands within the Royal Air Force.

Amateur radio licensees are not allowed to operate unattended radio beacon transmitters on 28.000–29.700 MHz, 10.000–10.125 GHz, 24.000–24.050 GHz, or 47.000–47.200 GHz within 50 kilometres (31 miles) of the Waddington airfield, centred on Ordnance Survey Grid Reference SK 985640.

== Based units ==
The following notable flying and non-flying units are based at RAF Waddington:

=== Royal Air Force ===
No. 1 Group (Air Combat) RAF

- Intelligence, Surveillance, Target Acquisition and Reconnaissance (ISTAR) Force
  - ISTAR Air Wing
    - ISTAR Air Wing Headquarters
    - ISTAR Engineering Wing
    - ISTAR Support Wing
    - No. 13 Squadron – Protector UAV
    - No. 14 Squadron – Shadow R1
    - No. 31 Squadron – Protector UAV
    - No. 51 Squadron – RC-135W Rivet Joint
    - No. 54 Squadron – ISTAR Force Operational Conversion Unit (OCU)
  - No. 1 Intelligence, Surveillance and Reconnaissance (ISR) Wing
    - No. 1 ISR Wing Headquarters
    - No. 1 ISR Squadron
    - No. 2 ISR Squadron
    - No. 54 Signals Unit
    - ISR Support Squadron
- No. 616 (South Yorkshire) Squadron (Royal Auxiliary Air Force)
- RAF Aerobatic Team (The Red Arrows) – BAE Hawk T1A

No. 2 Group (Air Combat Support) RAF

- Air Security Force
  - No. 2 RAF Police & Security Wing
    - No. 2 RAF Police & Security Wing Headquarters
    - No. 5 RAF Police (ISTAR) Squadron Headquarters
    - No. 2503 (County of Lincoln) Squadron (Royal Auxiliary Air Force) Regiment
    - Defence Warning and Reporting Flight
- Intelligence Reserve Wing
  - No. 7006 (VR) Intelligence Squadron (Royal Auxiliary Air Force)
  - No. 7010 (VR) Photographic Interpretation Squadron (Royal Auxiliary Air Force)
  - No. 7630 (VR) Intelligence Squadron (Royal Auxiliary Air Force)

RAF Air and Space Warfare Centre

- Air and Space Warfare Centre Headquarters
- No. 56 Squadron – ISTAR Operational Evaluation Unit (OEU)
- No. 92 Tactics and Training Squadron
- No. 216 Squadron – drone swarm technology testing
- Air Battlespace Training Centre (ABTC)
- Joint Electronic Warfare Operational Support Centre

RAF Music Services

- RAF Waddington Voluntary Band

Other RAF units

- Mobile Meteorological Unit

=== British Army ===
Royal Engineers

- 8 Engineer Brigade
  - 170 (Infrastructure Support) Engineer Group
    - 20 Works Group (Air Support)
      - 531 Specialist Team Royal Engineers (Airfields) (STRE)

=== Civilian ===
- RAF Waddington Flying Club – Cessna 152, Cessna 172 and PA-28 Cherokee

== Heritage ==
=== Station badge and motto ===
The station badge depicts Lincoln Cathedral rising through the clouds, with the motto 'For Faith and Freedom' emblazoned below.

=== Gate guardians ===
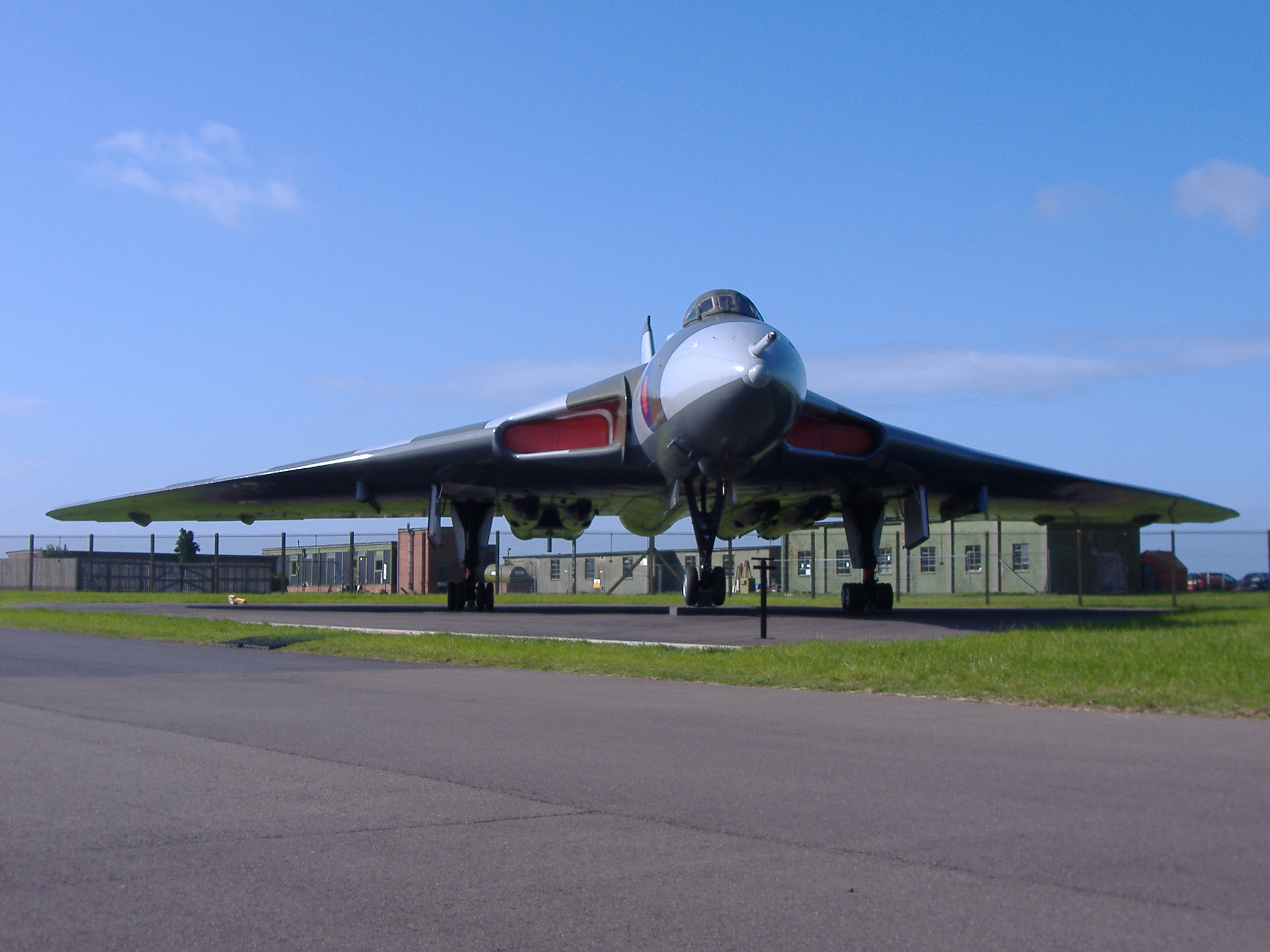
Avro Vulcan XM607, RAF Waddington's gate guardian.

The gate guardian at RAF Waddington is Avro Vulcan XM607, one of three Vulcan bombers (XM597, XM598, XM607) which took part in Operation Black Buck raids between April and June 1982 during the Falklands War. XM607 was stationed at Waddington and took part in the raids, captained by pilots Flight Lieutenant Martin Withers (on mission 1 and 7) and by Squadron Leader John Reeve (on mission 2). In 1984, along with all other remaining Vulcans, XM607 was retired from active service, and was preserved as the gate guardian at Waddington.

A Hawker Hunter F.6A acts as gate guardian outside the No. 8 Squadron facilities at Waddington. Styled as XE620 in No. 8 Squadron markings, the aircraft was originally XE606.

== List of Station Commanders ==
- July 1955, Group Captain Hugh P Connolly, later Air Commodore
- 14 September 1973, Group Captain Sir Richard C F Peirse, later Air Vice-Marshal
- 6 November 1981, Group Captain John Laycock
- 20 October 1989, Group Captain Pat N O Plunkett
- January 1992, Group Captain Jim L Uprichard
- December 1993, Group Captain Geoff Simpson, former Vulcan pilot with 50 Sqn
- 19 December 1995, Group Captain Mike J Remlinger
- 22 December 1997, Group Captain Ray J Horwood, later became Air Commodore
- 30 June 2000, Group Captain D L Whittingham
- 12 August 2004, Group Captain Chris J Coulls
- January 2012, Group Captain Alan Gillespie, later Air Commodore from 1 November 2013 – 16 November 2013
- Group Captain Allan Marshall 2016 – 2018
- Group Captain Tom Burke 2017 – 2019
- Group Captain Steve Kilvington 2020 – 2022
- Group Captain Mark Lorriman-Hughes January 2022 – December 2023
- Group Captain Dominic 'Dutch' Holland since December 2023

== Previous units ==
The following units were also stationed at Waddington at some point:

- No. 23 Squadron RAF
- 11th Aero Squadron
- 135th Aero Squadron
- No. 26 Squadron RAF Regiment
- No. 2956 Squadron RAF Regiment
- No. 1 Aircraft Storage Unit RAF (February 1935 - October 1938)
- No. 3 Group Practice Flight RAF (June - October 1937)
- No. 6 Blind Approach Training Flight RAF (January - October 1941) became No. 1506 (Beam Approach Training) Flight RAF (October 1941 - February 1943)
- No. 9 Conversion Flight RAF (August - November 1942)
- 27th (Training) Wing RAF
- No. 44 Conversion Flight RAF (January - November 1942)
- No. 53 Base RAF (November 1943 - November 1945)
- No. 230 Operational Conversion Unit RAF (May 1956 - June 1961)
- No. 420 Conversion Flight RAF (May - June 1942)
- No. 651 Squadron Army Air Corps
- No. 1661 Heavy Conversion Unit RAF (November 1942 - January 1943)
- Air Transport and Air-to-Air Refuelling Operational Evaluation Unit RAF
- DB-7 Flight (December 1940 - February 1941)
- Electronic Warfare Detachment
- Electronic Warfare Operational Support Establishment (April 1995 - )
- Ferrying Flight (May 1939 - ?)
- Lincoln Conversion Flight RAF (January - August 1953)
- Lincoln Reserve Holding Unit RAF
- Nimrod AEW Joint Trials Unit RAF (December 1984 - April 1987)
- Sentry Maintenance Squadron
- Sentry Operational Evaluation Unit RAF (June 1996 - ?)
- Sentry Standards Unit RAF (January 1993 - ?)
- Sentry Training Squadron RAF (June 1990 - April 1996)
- Vulcan Display Flight (April 1984 - September 1994)
- Defence Electronic Warfare Centre (DEWC)
- Electronic Reconnaissance Operations Support Squadron (EROSS)
- Operational Intelligence Support Centre (OSC)
- Air Intelligence Centre (AIC)

== Waddington International Airshow ==
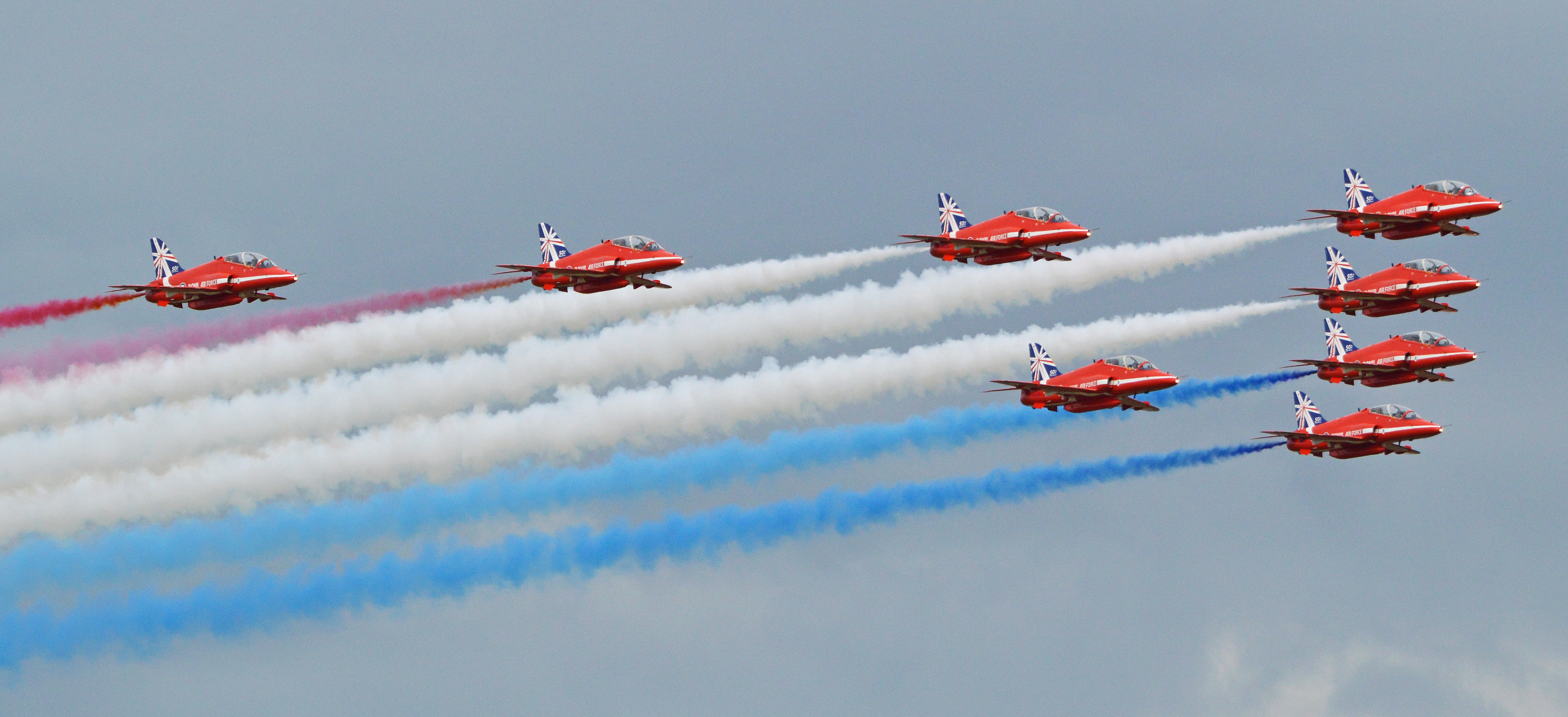
The Red Arrows at the 2014 Waddington International Airshow.

The first RAF Waddington International Airshow was staged at RAF Waddington in 1995, after the event was moved south from RAF Finningley, a now former Royal Air Force station east of Doncaster (now known Robin Hood Airport Doncaster Sheffield) which was closed in that year. Over the following years the RAF Waddington International Airshow developed into the largest of all Royal Air Force air shows. It took place on the first weekend in July, attracting over 140,000 visitors and representatives of air forces from all round the world. The main purpose of the show was to raise public awareness and understanding of the Royal Air Force and its role today. Eighty five percent of the proceeds from the event were distributed to the two main Service charities, the RAF Benevolent Fund (RAFBF) and the RAF Association (RAFA); the remaining 15% was donated to local causes. Since 1995, the airshow has raised almost £3 million for Service and local charities.

In 2015, the station was earmarked for development, a significant part of which being concerned with the station's runway, with work scheduled for 59 weeks. This therefore ruled out an airshow during 2015. The timing of the works coincided with a review of the station in general, the continuance of the airshow being also part of the review. The outcome was that having weighed up the content of the report, it was decided that: "significant security risks as well as certain operational risks" resulted from the operation of the RAF Waddington Airshow, and therefore the airshow, for the reasons cited, would not be continued with. These security risks have generally centred on RAF Waddington being used as a base for the operation of Reaper drones.

In February 2016, it was announced that following an agreement between the Royal Air Force and the Royal Air Force Charitable Trust, the venue of the airshow would switch from RAF Waddington to RAF Scampton, with the hope that the airshow would be resurrected in 2017.

== See also ==
- List of Royal Air Force stations
- List of V Bomber dispersal bases
