= John Gillespie Magee Jr. =

Royal Canadian Air Force officer and poet

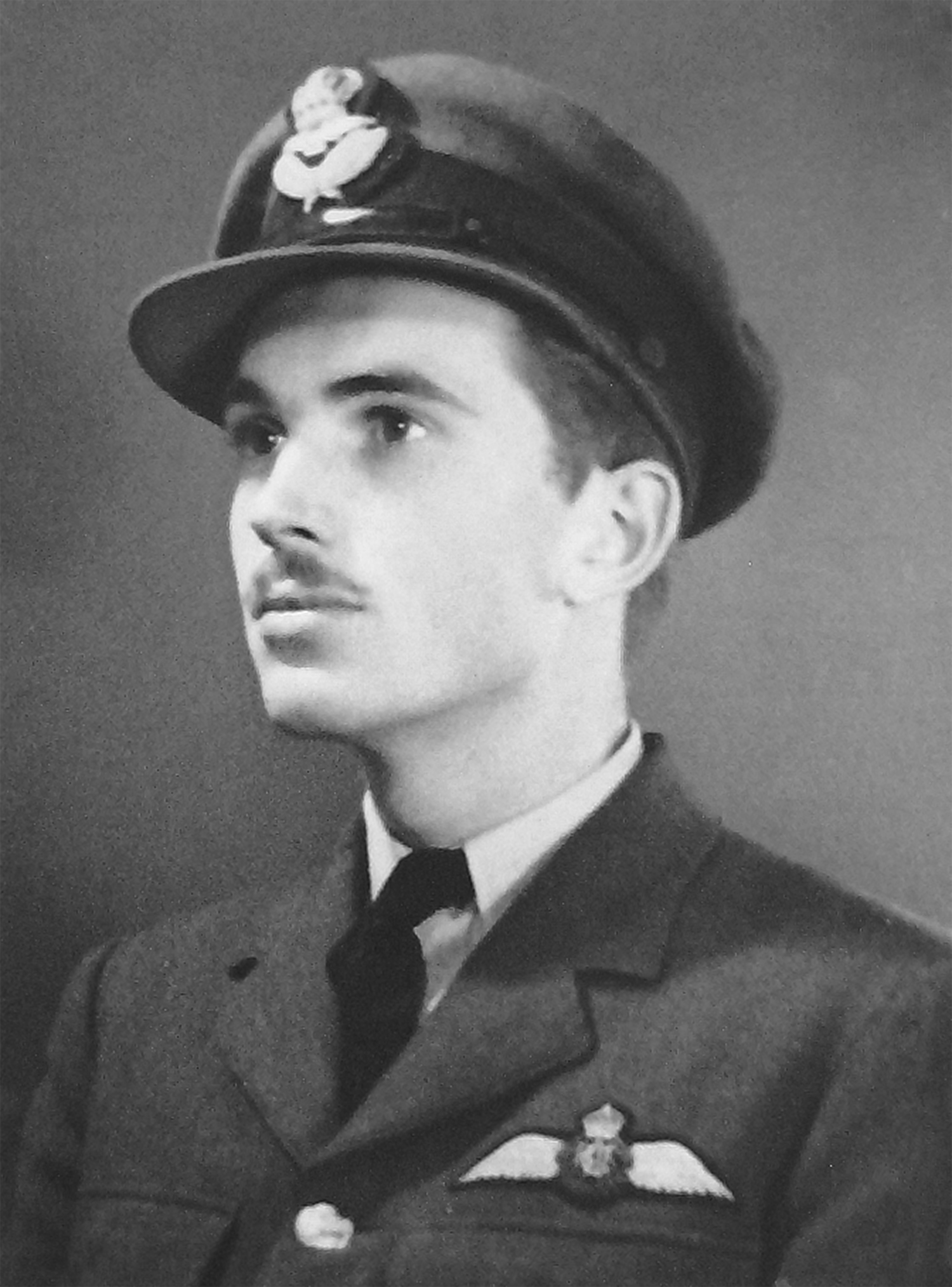
- Royal Canadian Air Force photo, 1941
- Born: 9 June 1922; Shanghai, Republic of China
- Died: 11 December 1941 (aged 19); Ruskington, England
- Burial place: Holy Cross Cemetery, Scopwick, England
- Military career
- Branch: Royal Canadian Air Force
- Service years: 1940–1941
- Rank: Pilot Officer
- Unit: No. 412 Squadron RCAF
- Conflicts: World War II

John Gillespie Magee Jr. (9 June 1922 – 11 December 1941) was a World War II Anglo-American Royal Canadian Air Force fighter pilot and war poet, who wrote the sonnet "High Flight". He was killed in an accidental mid-air collision over England in 1941.

== Early life ==
Sonnet to Rupert Brooke

"We laid him in a cool and shadowed grove
One evening in the dreamy scent of thyme
Where leaves were green, and whispered high above —
A grave as humble as it was sublime;

There, dreaming in the fading deeps of light —
The hands that thrilled to touch a woman's hair;
Brown eyes, that loved the Day, and looked on Night,
A soul that found at last its answered Prayer...

There daylight, as a dust, slips through the trees.
And drifting, gilds the fern around his grave —
Where even now, perhaps, the evening breeze
Steals shyly past the tomb of him who gave

New sight to blinded eyes; who sometimes wept —
A short time dearly loved; and after, — slept."

John Gillespie Magee was born in Shanghai, China, to an American father and a British mother, who both worked as Anglican missionaries. His father, John Magee Sr., was from a family of some wealth and influence in Pittsburgh, Pennsylvania. Magee Senior chose to become an Episcopal priest and was sent as a missionary to China. Whilst there he met his future wife, Faith Emmeline Backhouse, who came from Helmingham in Suffolk and was a member of the Church Missionary Society. Magee's parents married in 1921, and their first child, John Junior, was born 9 June 1922, the eldest of four brothers.

Magee began his education at the American School in Nanking in 1929. In 1931, he moved with his mother to England and spent the following four years at St Clare, a preparatory school for boys, in Walmer, in the county of Kent. From 1935 to 1939, he attended Rugby School, where he developed the ambition to become a poet, and whilst at the school won its Poetry Prize in 1938. He was impressed by the school's Roll of Honour listing its pupils who had fallen in the First World War, which included the Edwardian poet Rupert Brooke (1887–1915), whose writing style Magee emulated. Brooke had won the school's Poetry Prize 34 years prior to Magee. The prize-winning poem by Magee centred upon the burial of Brooke's body at 11 o'clock at night in an olive grove on the Greek island of Skyros in April 1915.

Whilst at Rugby, Magee fell in love with Elinor Lyon, the daughter of P. H. B. Lyon, the headmaster. In later life, an accomplished children's author, she became the inspiration for many of Magee's poems. Though his love was not returned, he remained friends with Elinor and her family.

Magee visited the United States in 1939, staying with his mother and brothers in Martha's Vineyard. He also visited relatives of his father in Pittsburgh, part of a very wealthy extended family which included the Mellons. One of these relatives was his uncle, Pittsburgh lawyer and Congressman James McDevitt Magee, who had served as a first lieutenant in the United States Army Air Service during the First World War. During Magee's stay in Pittsburgh, he participated to the full in the social life available to him there, including the Rolling Rock Club. His expenditures on these activities attracted critical correspondence from his clergyman father.

Because of the outbreak of World War II, Magee was unable to travel to Britain for his final school year (1939–1940) at Rugby, and instead attended Avon Old Farms School in Avon, Connecticut. The school "Provost", or headmaster, Rev. W. Brooke Stabler, later recalled an incident during the winter of 1939–1940, when, after a school dance:

Magee climbed a tall tree to rescue a cat; before he had come down out of the tree, there was a circle of admiring and exclaiming girls watching him from the ground...

His attitude toward the war gradually evolved from one approaching pacifism to a decision to become a pilot to help protect his friends in Britain. Stabler recalled:

One afternoon, after lying on top of a tower [at the School] for a couple of hours in the sun, Magee turned to his companion and suddenly announced, “Well, I think I’ll join the R.A.F.”

He once again stayed with his family in Martha's Vineyard in the summer of 1940, learning to drive and having a very active social life:

Mornings on the beach, surrounded by a bevy of girls ... dances ... beach parties ... occasionally a drop too much of alcohol ... wild drives around the bay to Vineyard Haven and Edgartown ... and grave discussions with his father on the state of the world or some phase of Christian living. When his father remonstrated with him once on turning night into day, John answered, "My generation does not expect to live long, and we want to enjoy ourselves while we may."

After discussions with his parents, he decided to go to Canada to join the Royal Canadian Air Force (RCAF), with the intention of learning to fly, and then being sent to Britain. Accordingly, while he had been offered a scholarship to Yale University for 1940–1941, he did not enroll.

== World War II ==
Magee joined the R.C.A.F. in October 1940 and received flight training in Ontario at No.9 Elementary Flying Training School, located at RCAF Station St. Catharines (St. Catharines), and at No. 2 Service Flying Training School at RCAF Station Uplands (Ottawa). He soloed at St. Catharines after six hours' dual instruction, when the average was 10 or 11. He passed his Wings Test in Ottawa in June 1941.

Shortly after his promotion to the rank of pilot officer, after having been awarded his wings, Magee was sent to the United Kingdom, where on arrival he was posted to No. 53 Operational Training Unit at RAF Llandow near Cardiff. His first flight in a Spitfire occurred on 7 August 1941. On 18 August, while still stationed at Llandow, he flew a Spitfire to 33,000 feet, by far his highest flight to that date. This is the flight usually accepted as having inspired his poem.

After completing his training with No. 53 Operational Training Unit he was assigned to No. 412 (Fighter) Squadron, R.C.A.F., a Canadian unit formed at RAF Digby on 30 June 1941. No. 412 Squadron was part of the "Digby Wing", commanded by the legendary "Cowboy" Blatchford. One of the other pilots serving at Digby that September was Flight Lieutenant "Hart" Massey, the son of Vincent Massey, the first Canadian-born Governor General of Canada.

Magee arrived at Digby on 23 September 1941, where he continued to train on the Spitfire. When Magee joined No.412 Squadron it was flying the Supermarine Spitfire Mk II; the squadron switched to the more powerful Mk Vb shortly after his arrival. He first took a Mk Vb aloft on 8 October 1941. On 20 October 1941, he took part in a convoy patrol, and on that same day the Squadron moved from the Digby Aerodrome to the nearby RAF Wellingore in Lincolnshire, a satellite station of Digby.

=== Raid on Lille ===
On 8 November 1941, he took part in a sortie to Occupied France escorting bombers attacking railway workshops at Lille. Twelve aeroplanes from No. 412 Squadron flew from Wellingore to RAF West Malling to refuel, and then headed out over the English Channel near RAF Manston. They crossed the hostile coast east of Dunkirk, encountering flak, after which they were attacked by Luftwaffe fighters. Of Magee's four-ship section that entered the engagement, only he survived; all the others (including No. 412's acting-squadron leader) were shot down and killed in action by the leading German ace Joachim Müncheberg. In the course of the engagement Magee fired 160 rounds of .303 ammunition, but made no claim for the infliction of damage to the enemy on returning to base in England. This was Magee's lone engagement with the Luftwaffe during the war.

In late November and early December 1941, Magee took part in three more convoy patrols.

=== Death ===
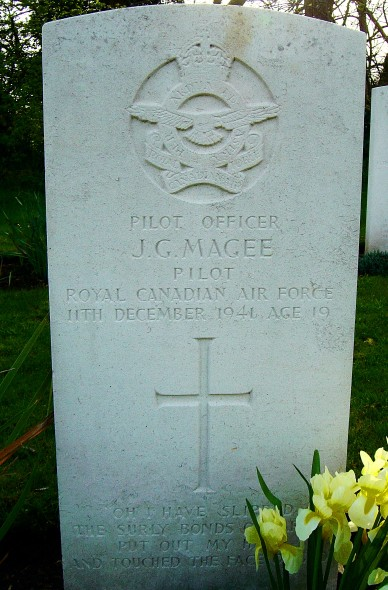
Magee's grave

On 11 December 1941, in his tenth week of active service, Magee was killed while flying Spitfire VZ-H (Serial No. AD291, the same aircraft he had flown in the engagement with the Luftwaffe over France four weeks earlier). He had taken off in the late morning with other members of No. 412 Squadron from RAF Wellingore (the airfield post-war has now reverted to agriculture) to practise air fighting tactics. During the performance, Magee's aircraft was involved in a mid-air collision with an Airspeed Oxford trainer (Serial No.T1052) flying out of RAF Cranwell, piloted by 19-year-old Leading Aircraftman/Pilot Under-Training Ernest Aubrey Griffin. The two aircraft collided just below the cloud base at about 1,400 feet AGL, at 11:30, over the hamlet of Roxholme, which lies between RAF Cranwell and RAF Digby, in Lincolnshire. Magee was descending at high speed through a break in the clouds in concert with three other Spitfires when his struck the Airspeed Oxford.

At the inquiry afterwards a local farmer who witnessed the accident testified that he saw Magee after the collision struggling to push back the canopy of his Spitfire as it descended apparently out of control. Magee succeeded in opening the canopy and bailing out of the aeroplane, but was at too low an altitude for his parachute to have time to open, and he fell to earth and was killed instantly on impact with the ground in farmland near the village of Ruskington. He was 19 years of age. Leading Aircraftman/Pilot Under-Training Griffin, the other pilot involved in the mid-air collision, was also killed in the incident.

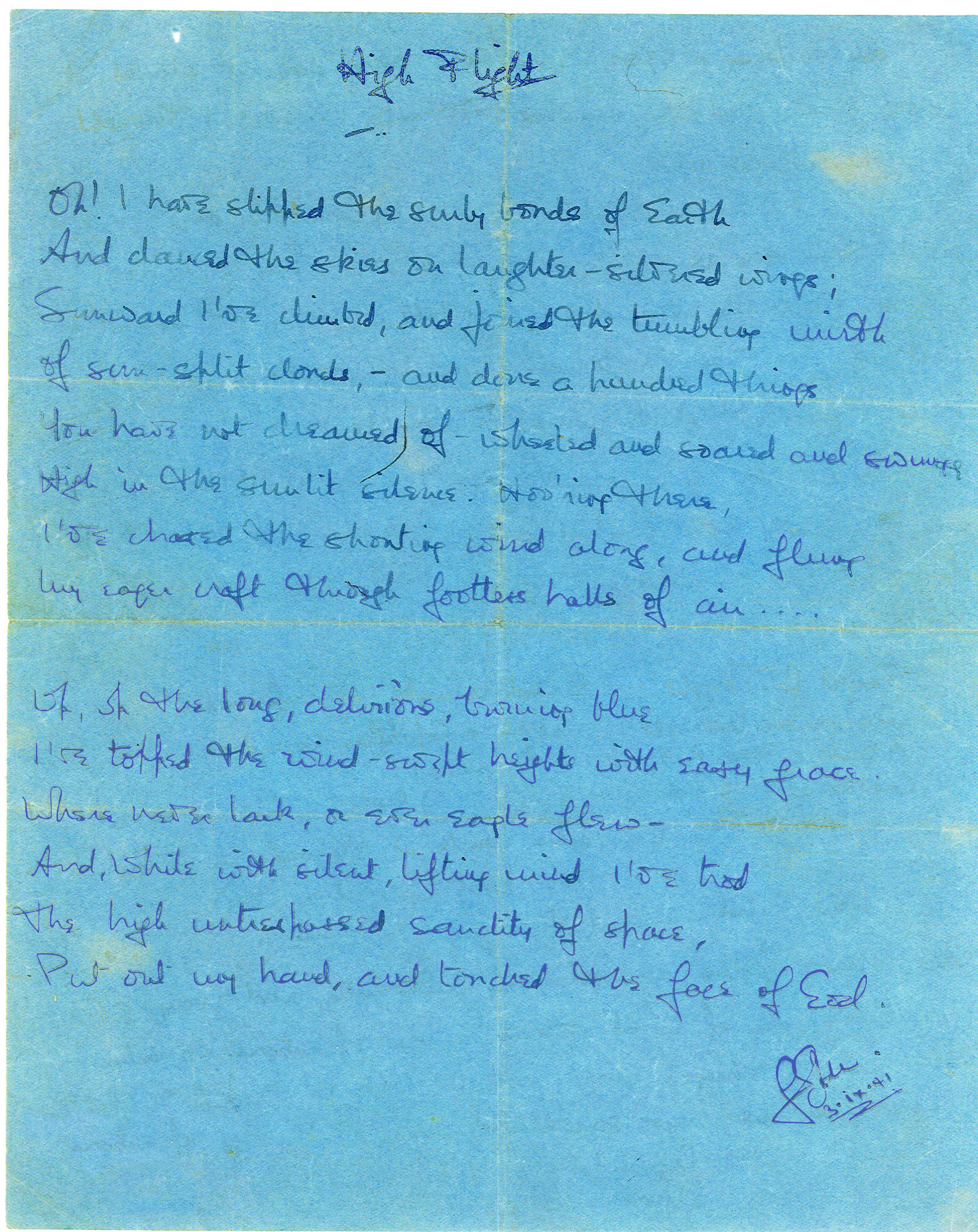
Magee's manuscript of "High Flight", mailed to his parents, signed and dated 3 September 1941 ("3•IX•41"). He would die three months later. Note that this version has had the Library of Congress markings digitally removed, to more closely resemble this letter's appearance when it was received by the Magee parents (click on this image to see the original).

Magee's body was buried in the graveyard of Holy Cross Church in the village of Scopwick in Lincolnshire. On the gravestone are inscribed the first and last lines from his poem "High Flight". Part of the official letter to his parents read, "Your son's funeral took place at Scopwick Cemetery, near Digby Aerodrome, at 2.30 pm, on Saturday, 13 December 1941, the service being conducted by Flight Lieutenant S. K. Belton, the Canadian padre of this Station. He was accorded full Service Honours, the coffin being carried by pilots of his own Squadron".

== High Flight ==
Magee's posthumous fame rests mainly on his sonnet High Flight, which he began writing on 18 August 1941 (a few months before his death) while stationed at No. 53 OTU at RAF Llandow in Wales. The poem was inspired by high-altitude training sessions with his squadron. Magee enclosed the poem in a letter to his parents, dated 3 September 1941. His father, then curate of Saint John's Episcopal Church in Washington, D.C., reprinted it in church publications. The poem became more widely known through the efforts of Archibald MacLeish, then Librarian of Congress, who included it in an exhibition of poems called "Faith and Freedom" at the Library of Congress in February 1942. The manuscript copy of the poem remains at the Library of Congress.

Reading of the poem "High Flight"

=== Cultural significance ===
During April and May 1942, many Hollywood stars including Laurel and Hardy, Groucho Marx, Cary Grant, Bing Crosby, and Bob Hope joined the Hollywood Victory Caravan as it toured the United States on a mission to raise war bonds. Actress Merle Oberon recited High Flight as part of this show. During the performance on 30 April 1942, at the Loew's Capitol Theatre in Washington, D.C., and before her recitation of the poem, Oberon acknowledged the attendance of Magee's father, John Magee, and brother Christopher Magee.

Owing to its cheerful description of flying and its symbolic descriptions of transcending Earth, High Flight is beloved by many aviators and astronauts. It is the official poem of the Royal Canadian Air Force and the Royal Air Force and has to be recited from memory by fourth class cadets at the United States Air Force Academy, where it can be seen on display in the Cadet Field House. Portions of the poem appear on many of the headstones in the Arlington National Cemetery, and it is inscribed in full on the back of the Space Shuttle Challenger Memorial. It is displayed on panels at the Canadian War Museum in Ottawa, the National Air Force Museum of Canada, in Trenton, Ontario. It is the subject of a permanent display at the National Museum of the United States Air Force, in Dayton, Ohio.

Commissioned by the Graduates Association of the Tenri High School band of Nara, Japan. Composer James Curnow wrote the musical piece, "Where Never Lark or Eagle Flew," which was inspired by the famous line from Magee's poem. The piece embodies both the thrilling motion of flight through a bouncy 6/8 time signature, and the solemn notion of Magee's early death in a melodic middle section. The piece debuted in 1993 and has since become a standard in wind band literature.

== Per Ardua ==
Per Ardua

(To those who gave their lives to England during the Battle of Britain and left such a shining example to us who follow, these lines are dedicated.)

They that have climbed the white mists of the morning;
They that have soared, before the world's awake,
To herald up their foeman to them, scorning
The thin dawn's rest their weary folk might take;
Some that have left other mouths to tell the story
Of high, blue battle, quite young limbs that bled,
How they had thundered up the clouds to glory,
Or fallen to an English field stained red.
Because my faltering feet would fail I find them
Laughing beside me, steadying the hand
That seeks their deadly courage –
Yet behind them
The cold light dies in that once brilliant Land ....
Do these, who help the quickened pulse run slowly,
Whose stern, remembered image cools the brow,
Till the far dawn of Victory, know only
Night's darkness, and Valhalla's silence now?

Shortly after Magee's first combat action on 8 November 1941, he sent his family part of another poem, referring to it as "another trifle which may interest you". It is possible that the poem Per Ardua is the last that Magee wrote. There are several corrections to the poem made by Magee, which suggest that it was not completed when he sent it. Per ardua ad astra ("Through adversity to the stars") is the motto of a number of Commonwealth air forces, such as the Royal Air Force, RAAF, RNZAF and the RCAF. It was first used in 1912 by the newly formed Royal Flying Corps.
