= Scopwick =

Village and civil parish in Lincolnshire, England

Coordinates: 53.108674°N 0.405056°W

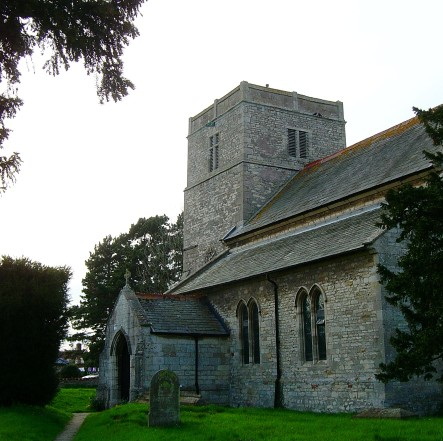
- Church of the Holy Cross, Scopwick

- Location within Lincolnshire
- Population: 815 (2011)
- OS grid reference: TF068580
  - London: 115 mi (185 km) S
- District: North Kesteven
- Shire county: Lincolnshire
- Region: East Midlands
- Country: England
- Sovereign state: United Kingdom
- Post town: Lincoln
- Postcode district: LN4
- Dialling code: 01526
- Police: Lincolnshire
- Fire: Lincolnshire
- Ambulance: East Midlands
- UK Parliament: Sleaford and North Hykeham

Scopwick is a small village and civil parish in the district of North Kesteven, Lincolnshire, England, situated 6 miles (9.7 km) south from Lincoln. The population of the civil parish at the 2011 census was 815. The parish includes Kirkby Green, a hamlet to the east of Scopwick. The village main road runs parallel to a narrow stream.

The name “Scopwick” comes from Old English, combating scaep meaning "sheep" and wick meaning "farm".

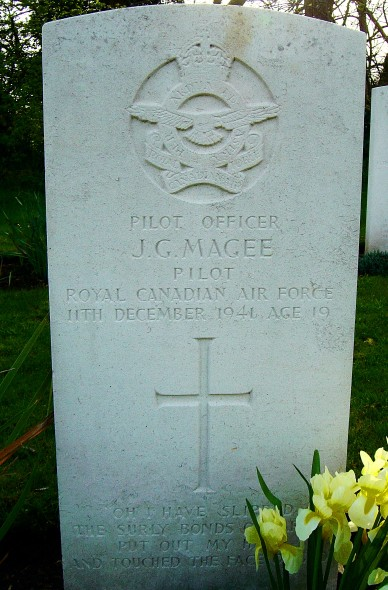
Grave of John Gillespie Magee

The village cemetery includes a War Graves site for airmen from RAF Coleby Grange and RAF Digby (originally RAF Scopwick), and includes the grave of the nineteen-year-old Second World War poet and aviator John Gillespie Magee, who wrote the celebrated poem ‘High Flight’.

Part of the brick tower of Scopwick Tower Mill, which was built in 1827 and fell into disuse around 1912, remains standing.

== History ==
Bronze Age burials and barrows have been found in Scopwick. There is evidence of a Roman settlement (coins, pottery, burials and a dwelling). A Saxon coin found in the village depicts Offa and has been dated to 757–796 AD.

The village is mentioned in the Domesday Book of 1086 as Scapeuic/Scapewic.

=== 1964 air incident ===
Two pilots ejected on the morning of Monday 15 June 1964. A BAC Jet Provost exploded in mid-air, from Cranwell. Flt Lt Etches and Flt Lt Denham ejected. They were taken to RAF Hospital Nocton Hall. The fire engines were from RAF Digby and the Kesteven Fire Brigade at Sleaford.

== Geography and ecology ==
A limestone stream runs through the village toward Kirkby Green and terminates near the railway. Wildlife on the stream includes moorhen, mallard, water mint and hart's tongue fern. Around Scopwick Hall there is a small deciduous woodland. To the northwest of the village is a quarry.
