= Tactical Imagery Intelligence Wing, RAF =

Tactical Imagery-Intelligence Wing
- Wing badge
- Active: April 2002 – April 2016
- Country: United Kingdom
- Branch: Royal Air Force
- Type: Intelligence
- Size: Wing
- Part of: No. 1 Group RAF
- Station: RAF Marham
- Motto: Oculi Propter Ungues

Tactical Imagery-Intelligence Wing (TIW) was a 1 Group Force Element, based at RAF Marham.

== History ==
TIW was responsible for the processing and exploitation of fast-jet electro-optical imagery, on deployed operations, exercises and routine training. Fast-jet imagery has been analysed from the Raptor pod on the Tornado GR4 and the Digital Joint Reconnaissance Pod on the Jaguar, Harrier and Tornado GR4. TIW was also responsible for providing specialist training of all Imagery Analysts within 1 Group.

TIW was formed in April 2002 from II (AC), XIII and 39 (1 PRU) Sqn RICs (Reconnaissance Intelligence Centre). No. 41(F) Sqn RIC became part of TIW in April 2003. The formal grouping of what were previously four separate RICs brings benefits in ensuring a more coherent approach against a common set of standards.

Traditionally, TIW was considered to be part of the role known as tactical reconnaissance or tac recce. As traditional tasking and reporting has evolved to provide a much broader, more complex and often more dynamic set of questions to—and range of products from—TIW, the term Combat-aircraft ISTAR (Intelligence, Surveillance, Target-Acquisition and Reconnaissance) much better describes the role of TIW and the aircraft that collect the imagery.

On 1 April 2016, TIW merged with other ISR units to form No. 1 Intelligence, Surveillance, and Reconnaissance Wing based at RAF Waddington.
