= No. 1 Intelligence, Surveillance, and Reconnaissance Wing RAF =

Wing of the Royal Air Force

No. 1 Intelligence, Surveillance, and Reconnaissance Wing
- Wing badge
- Active: 1 April 2016–present
- Country: United Kingdom
- Branch: Royal Air Force
- Type: Non-flying wing
- Role: Intelligence, Surveillance, and Reconnaissance
- Part of: ISTAR Force
- Headquarters: RAF Waddington
- Mottos: Oculi Propter Ungues (Latin for 'The eyes guide the talons')

No. 1 Intelligence, Surveillance, and Reconnaissance Wing (1 ISR Wing) is a wing of the Royal Air Force and is part of the ISTAR Force in No. 1 Group based at RAF Waddington. 1 ISR Wing is responsible for producing intelligence from imagery intelligence and electronic surveillance.

== History ==
The wing was formed in 2016 merging several ISR units into a new speciality wing including the Tactical Imagery-Intelligence Wing, the signals intelligence and electronic intelligence No. 54 Signals Unit and imagery analysts from V (AC) Squadron. In 2018, the Reconnaissance, Intelligence and Geographical Centre Northern Ireland (RIGC-NI) of 5 Regiment Army Air Corps was renamed No. 3 ISR Squadron and became part of 1 ISR Wing.

== Structure ==
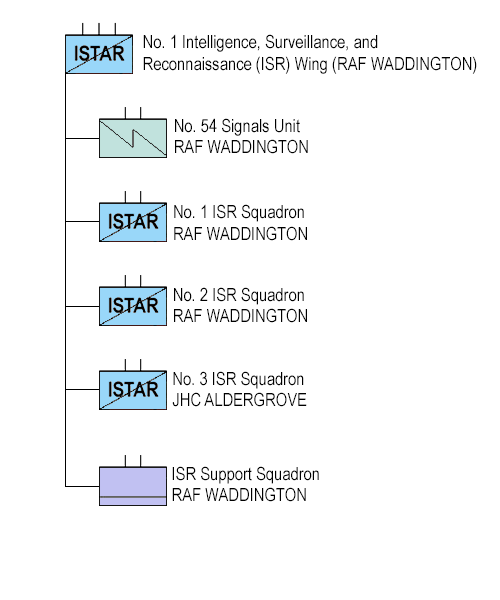
Graphic of the Royal Air Force's No. 1 ISR Wing structure.

The current structure of the wing is as follows:

- No.1 Intelligence, Surveillance, and Reconnaissance Wing
  - Wing Headquarters, at RAF Waddington
  - No. 54 Signals Unit
  - No. 1 Intelligence, Surveillance, and Reconnaissance Squadron
  - No.2 Intelligence, Surveillance, and Reconnaissance Squadron
  - No.3 Intelligence, Surveillance, and Reconnaissance Squadron, at Aldergrove Flying Station
    - 54 Signals Unit Engineering Flight, at RAF Waddington and RAF Digby (supporting 54 Signals Unit)
    - ISR Enabling Squadron, at RAF Waddington (supports No.1 ISR Wing)
