= Beny-sur-Mer Airfield =

Former World War II airfield

Beny-sur-Mer Airfield Advanced Landing Ground B-4
- Sainte-Croix-sur-Mer Airfield (France)

Site information
- Type: Military Airfield
- Controlled by: Royal Air Force

Location
- Coordinates: 49°17′54″N 000°25′49″W

Site history
- In use: June–August 1944
- Battles/wars: Western Front

Beny-sur-Mer Airfield is a former Second World War airfield, located 1 km north-northeast of Beny-sur-Mer in the Lower Normandy region, France.

== History ==
Beny-sur-Mer was completed on 15 June 1944 by Royal Engineers, only 10 days after D-Day. It consisted of a 4,000' SMT runway aligned 08/35, dispersal areas, communications facilities, landing lights and many other requirements to run an airfield. Soon after the airfield began seeing use by the RCAF's 401, 411 and 412 Sqn and RAF's 35 Recce Wing (2 and 268 Sqn), 136 Wing (263 Sqn) and 146 Wing (193,197,257,266 Sqn), flying Hawker Typhoons and Supermarine Spitfires.

Beny-sur-Mer Airfield was used until early August 1944, and afterwards the engineers moved in and dismantled all recoverable equipment along with the SMT. The land was then returned to the French farmers, and over the years, the land has been used as agricultural fields. Today, nothing remains of the former airfield.
