= Redhill Aerodrome =

Aerodrome in Surrey, England

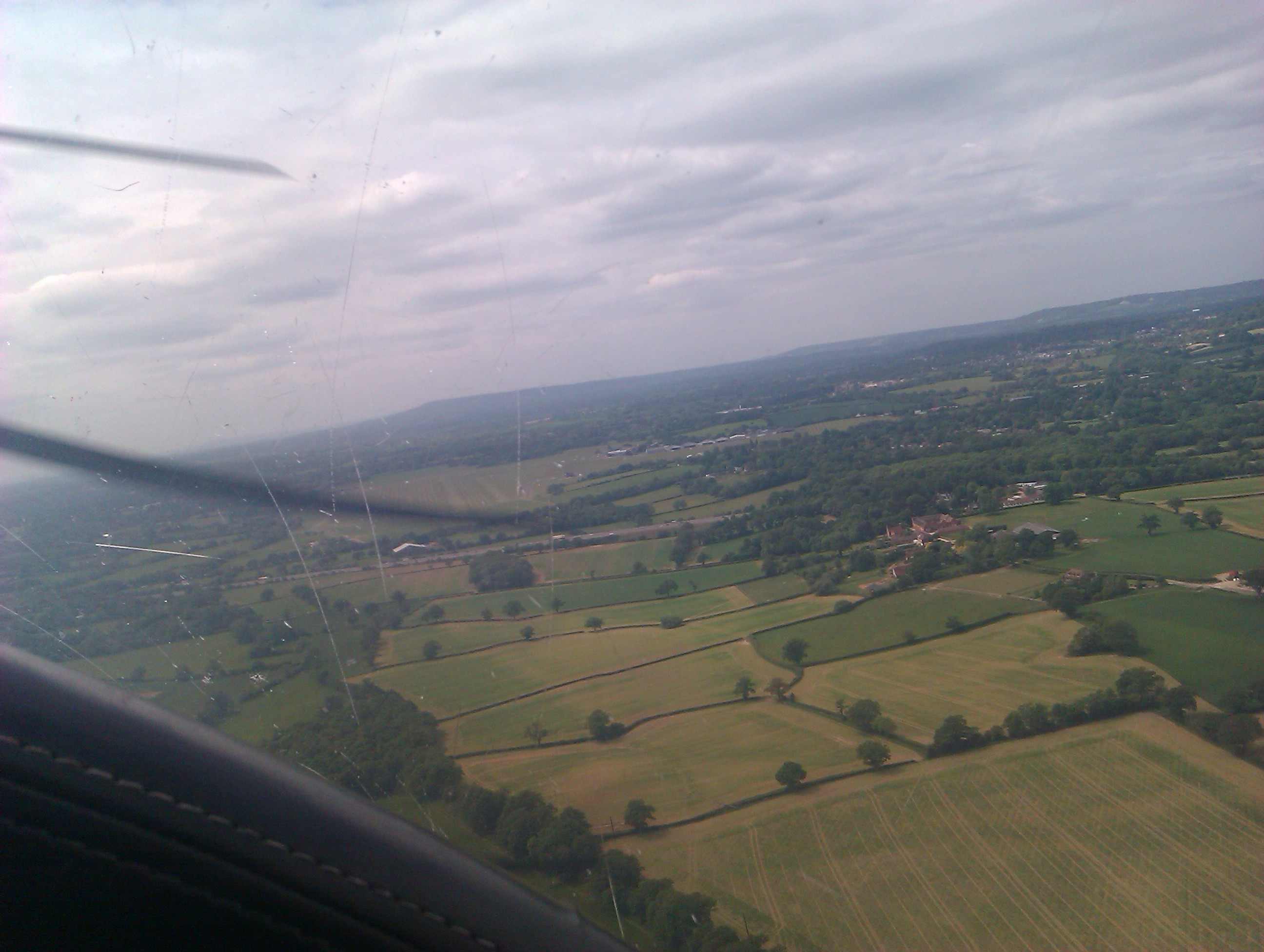
- Approaching Redhill to land in a Piper Cherokee
- IATA: none; ICAO: EGKR

Summary
- Airport type: Private
- Operator: Redhill Aerodrome Ltd
- Location: Nutfield, Surrey
- Elevation AMSL: 222 ft (68 m)
- Coordinates: 51°12′49″N 000°08′19″W
- Website: www.redhillaerodrome.com

Map
- Location in Surrey

Runways
Direction	Length		Surface
Direction	m	ft	Surface
18/36	851	2,792	Grass
07R/25L	897	2,943	Grass
07L/25R	683	2,241	Grass
06/24 (unlicensed)	500	1,640	Asphalt taxiway
- Sources: UK AIP at NATS

Redhill Aerodrome (ICAO: EGKR) is an operational general aviation aerodrome located 1.5 NM (2.8 km; 1.7 mi) south-east of Redhill, Surrey, England.

Redhill Aerodrome has a CAA Ordinary Licence (Number P421) that allows flights for the public transport of passengers or for flying instruction as authorised by the licensee (Redhill Aerodrome Limited).

== Early history ==
The airfield came into use in the 1930s for private flying and it was used as an alternative airfield to Croydon Airport by Imperial Airways.

No. 15 Elementary and Reserve Flying Training School RAF was formed at Redhill on 1 July 1937. Training continued at the start of the Second World War using the Miles Magister. The school was renamed to the No. 15 Elementary Flying Training School RAF on 3 September 1939.

The Fairey Battle was also flown particularly for use with the Polish Grading and Testing Flight which was formed here on 14 March 1940.

With the threat of a German attack on the airfield the Flying Training School moved to northern England in June 1940.

== RAF Redhill ==
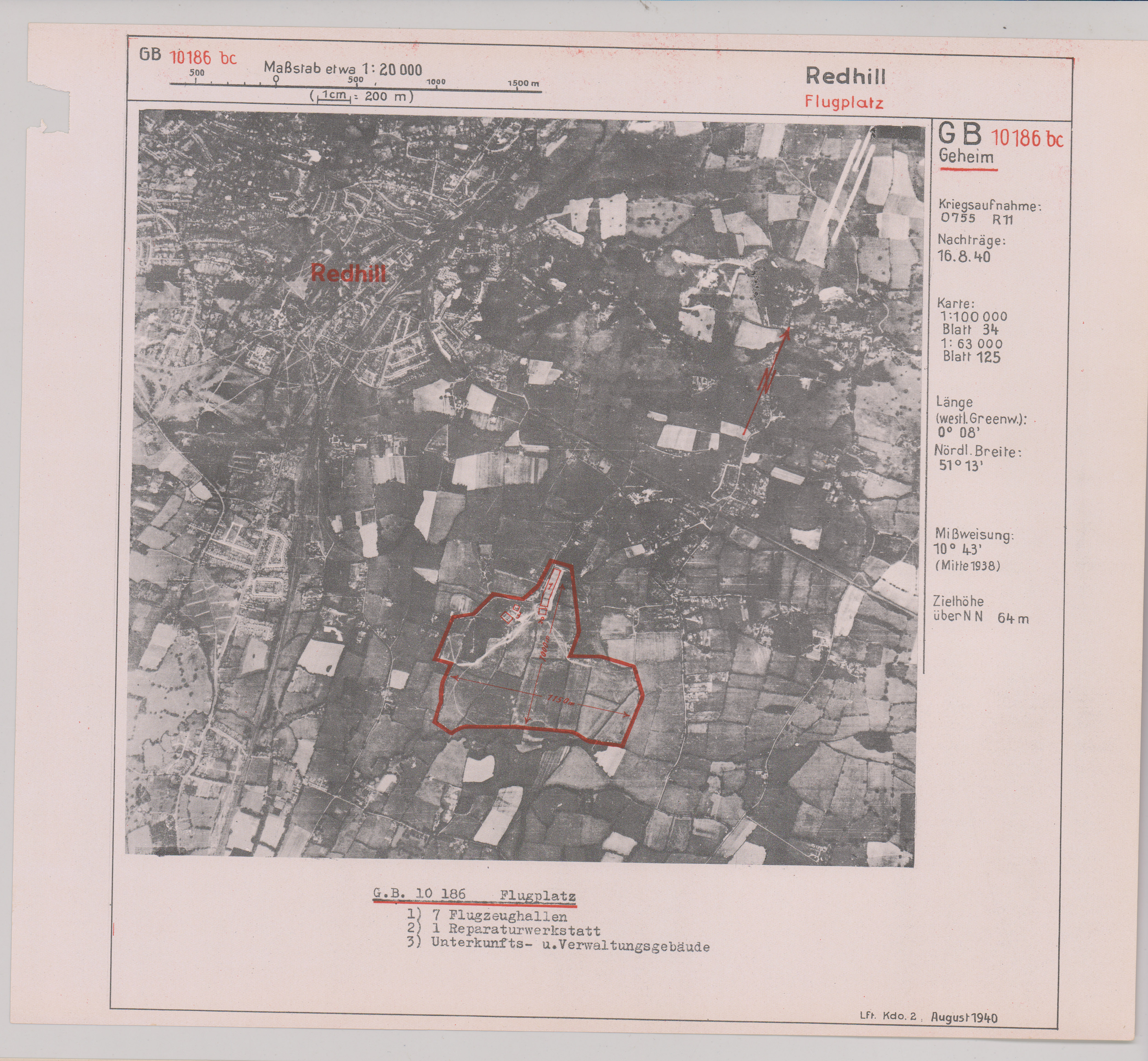
RAF Redhill on a target dossier of the German Luftwaffe, 1940

With the withdrawal of the Flying Training School the airfield became an operational RAF station. First to move in were 16 Squadron operating the Westland Lysander. The Lysanders did not stay long and RAF Redhill had many short-term deployments, mainly of fighter squadrons.

In August 1942 the airfield had five squadrons based. By the end of 1943 the fighter squadrons had moved on and the airfield was used by support units until the end of the war.

=== Squadrons ===
- Royal Air Force
  - No. 1 Squadron RAF – Hawker Hurricane
  - No. 16 Squadron RAF – Westland Lysander
  - No. 66 Squadron RAF – Supermarine Spitfire
  - No. 116 Squadron RAF – Airspeed Oxford and Avro Anson
  - No. 131 Squadron RAF – Spitfire
  - No. 219 Squadron RAF – Bristol Blenheim, Bristol Beaufighter
  - No. 231 Squadron RAF – North American Mustang
  - No. 258 Squadron RAF – Hurricane
  - No. 287 Squadron RAF
  - No. 303 (Polish) Fighter Squadron – Spitfire
  - No. 308 (Polish) Fighter Squadron
  - No. 310 (Czechoslovak) Squadron RAF – Spitfire
  - No. 312 (Czechoslovak) Squadron RAF – Spitfire
  - No. 340 (GC IV/2 Île-de-France) Squadron RAF – Spitfire
  - No. 350 (Belgian) Squadron RAF – Spitfire
- Auxiliary Air Force
  - No. 504 (County of Nottingham) Squadron AAF – Spitfire
  - No. 600 (City of London) Squadron AAF
  - No. 602 (City of Glasgow) Squadron AAF – Spitfire
  - No. 611 (West Lancashire) Squadron AAF – Spitfire
- Royal Australian Air Force
  - No. 452 Squadron RAAF – Spitfire
  - No. 457 Squadron RAAF – Spitfire
- Royal Canadian Air Force
  - No. 110 Squadron RCAF – Lysander
  - No. 400 Squadron RCAF – Mustang
  - No. 401 Squadron RCAF
  - No. 402 Squadron RCAF – Mustang
  - No. 411 Squadron RCAF
  - No. 412 Squadron RCAF
  - No. 414 Squadron RCAF – Mustang
  - No. 416 Squadron RCAF – Spitfire
  - No. 421 Squadron RCAF – Spitfire
- Royal New Zealand Air Force
  - No. 485 Squadron RNZAF – Spitfire

=== Units ===
- No. 1 Aircraft Delivery Flight RAF
- No. 1 Casualty Air Evacuation Unit RAF
- No. 4 Overseas Aircraft Despatch Unit RAF
- No. 15 Reserve Flying School RAF
- No. 17 (Fighter) Wing RAF
- No. 24 Balloon Centre
- No. 39 (RCAF) (Reconnaissance) Wing RAF
- No. 50 (Army Co-operation) Wing RAF
- No. 83 Group Communication Flight RAF
- No. 83 Group Support Unit RAF
- No. 84 Group Communication Squadron RAF
- No. 126 Airfield Headquarters RAF
- No. 128 Airfield Headquarters RAF
- No. 212 Maintenance Unit RAF
- No. 950 (Balloon) Squadron
- No. 970 (Balloon) Squadron
- No. 1310 (Transport) Flight RAF
- No. 2732 Squadron RAF Regiment
- No. 2734 Squadron RAF Regiment
- No. 2741 Squadron RAF Regiment
- No. 2775 Squadron RAF Regiment
- No. 2781 Squadron RAF Regiment
- No. 2794 Squadron RAF Regiment
- No. 2828 Squadron RAF Regiment
- No. 3205 Servicing Commando
- No. 3207 Servicing Commando
- No. 3209 Servicing Commando
- No. 3210 Servicing Commando
- Canadian Casualty Air Evacuation Unit
- 'Z' Composite Group

== Postwar ==
The airfield returned to civilian use in 1947 but was suspended in 1954. In 1959 flying resumed at Redhill when the Tiger Club moved in. The following year Bristow Helicopters started to use Redhill as an operating base and carry out helicopter maintenance for the next 40 years.

The airfield is still operated for private flying and training, with an emphasis on helicopter operators. Pilots can use three grass runways. Information on the aerodrome's state can be found on the operator's, Redhill Aerodrome Limited, website.

The aerodrome has its own Air Traffic Control and fire and rescue services.

The airfield has also been the venue for the flying displays and aviation trade shows, including the annual Redhill Airshow in the past, which was focused around a charitable cause.

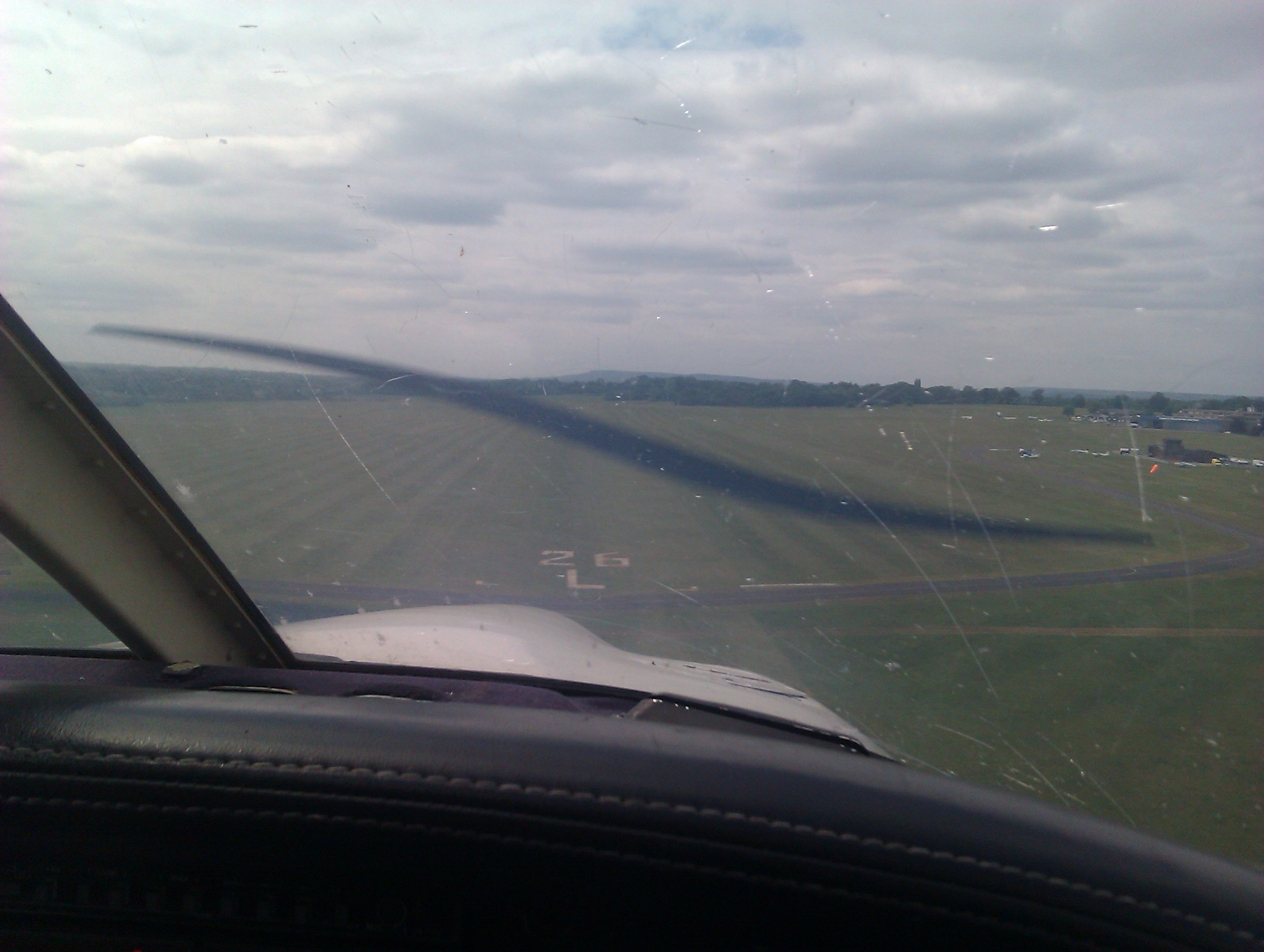
About to land on runway 26L, now 25L, in a Piper Cherokee

On 17 May 2012 it was announced that the owners of Redhill Aerodrome had again submitted a planning application for a hard runway after the previous plan had been rejected in 2011. Opponents at the time, including local MP Sam Gyimah, argued that the runway would "create an unacceptable level of noise and pollution and destroy the landscape". In June 2013 the second application was also refused. In February 2014 the aerodrome lost a planning appeal; it was appealing against the June 2013 decision to reject the planning application.

At the start of 2013, the Surrey and Sussex Air Ambulance service relocated its helicopter to Redhill from Dunsfold Aerodrome in order to enable it to provide a night flight service across Kent, Surrey and Sussex.

On 24 December 2013, the aerodrome suffered storm damage and flooding, with some light aircraft overturned.

On 13th April 2015, the aerodrome suffered a large fire, with a number of businesses destroyed.

== Redhill Airshow ==
The Redhill Airshow was a "garden party" style event held at Redhill Aerodrome until 2006. The show has seen flypasts by the Red Arrows and displays from the Royal Air Force solo display teams, the Battle of Britain Memorial Flight including the Lancaster Bomber and other popular warbirds.

In June 2015, a smaller airshow was introduced under the title of the Redhill Aviation Festival.

== See also ==
- List of Royal Air Force aircraft squadrons
- Airports of London
