= RAF Kenley =

Former Royal Air Force flying base in Surrey, England

RAF Kenley
- Kenley, Croydon, Greater London in England
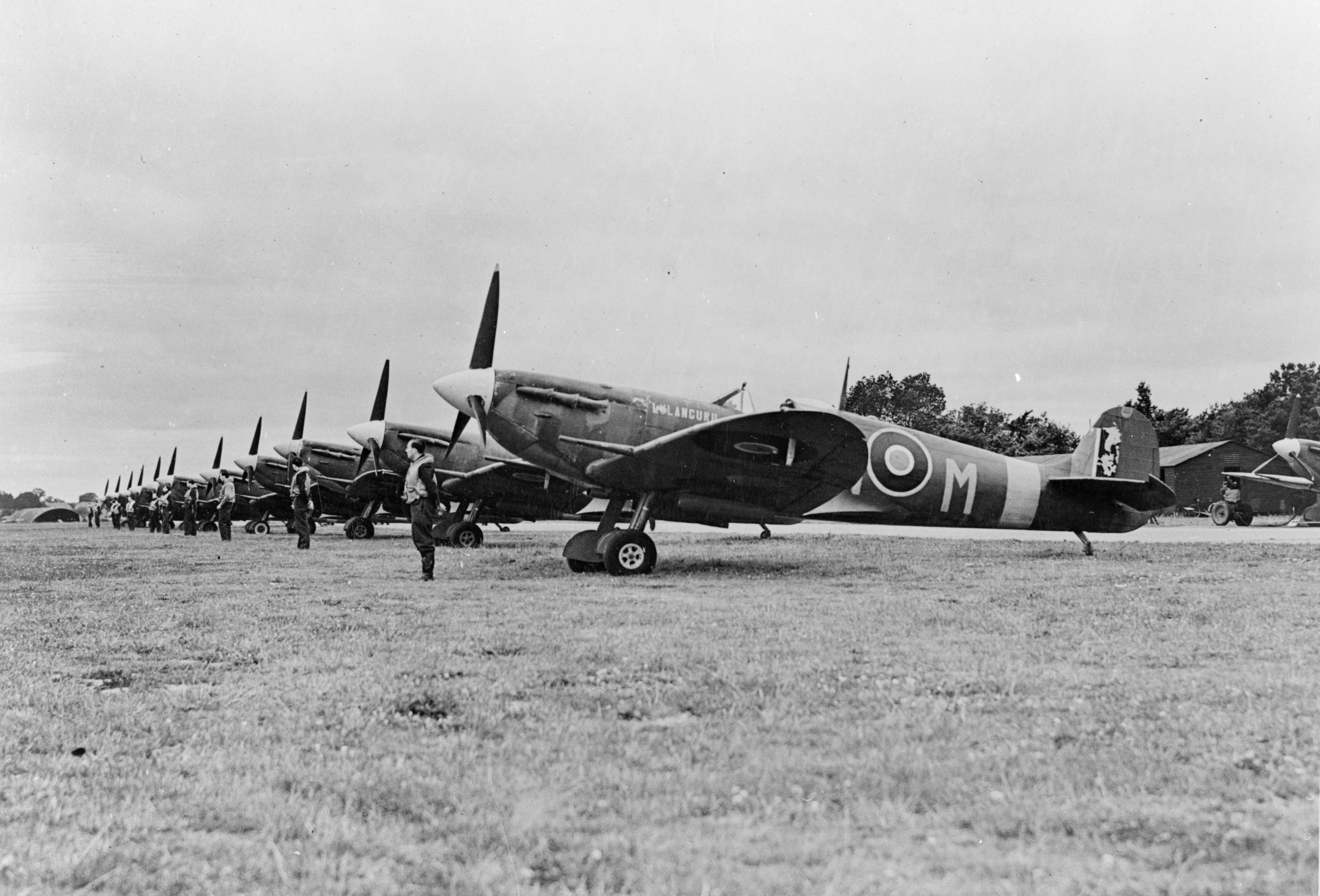
- Supermarine Spitfire Mk V of No. 350 (Belgian) Squadron at RAF Kenley during the Second World War.

- Nisi dominus pro nobis (Latin for 'We depend on the Lord')

Site information
- Type: Royal Air Force station
- Code: KE
- Owner: Ministry of Defence (MOD)
- Operator: Royal Air Force
- Controlled by: No. 22 Group
- Condition: Open

Location
- Shown within Greater London RAF Kenley (the United Kingdom)
- Coordinates: 51°18′13″N 000°05′42″W
- Area: 49 hectares

Site history
- Built: 1917
- Built by: Constable, Hart & Co Ltd
- In use: 1917 – 1959; 1959 -
- Fate: Retained by the MOD and used for gliding, some parts of airfield sold for residential redevelopment.
- Battles/wars: European theatre of World War II

Garrison information
- Occupants: No. 615 Volunteer Gliding Squadron

Airfield information
- Identifiers: ICAO: EGKN, WMO: 03781
- Elevation: 160 metres (525 ft) AMSL
Runways
Direction	Length and surface
NE/SW	1,130 metres (3,707 ft) Concrete
NW/SE	770 metres (2,526 ft) Concrete

Royal Air Force Kenley, more commonly known as RAF Kenley, is a former station of the Royal Flying Corps in the First World War and the RAF in the Second World War. It played a significant role during the Battle of Britain as one of the three RAF stations specifically tasked with the defence of London. It is located near Kenley on the edge of Greater London. The site remains in use with the Ministry of Defence, as Kenley Airfield.

== History ==
Air Ministry (Heston and Kenley Aerodromes Extension) Act 1939
- Act of Parliament
- Parliament of the United Kingdom
- Long title: An Act to provide for the acquisition by the Secretary of State for Air of certain land in Middlesex, and for the stopping up of certain highways in Middlesex and Surrey; to confirm an agreement between the Mayor and Commonalty and Citizens of the City of London and the Secretary of State for Air relating to the extension of the site of Kenley Aerodrome; and for purposes connected with the matters aforesaid.
- Citation: 2 & 3 Geo. 6. c. 59
- Territorial extent: United Kingdom

Dates
- Royal assent: 4 August 1939
- Commencement: 4 August 1939 (Note: The Acts of Parliament (Commencement) Act 1793.)

Status: Current legislation

Text of statute as originally enacted

RAF Kenley was a frontline operation military airfield between 1917 and 1959 when RAF Fighter Command left the aerodrome. Originally built for the Royal Flying Corps in the First World War, it was radically rebuilt in August 1939 under authority of the Air Ministry (Heston and Kenley Aerodromes Extension) Act 1939 (2 & 3 Geo. 6. c. 59) in preparation for future operation of new aircraft, such as the Hawker Hurricane, Supermarine Spitfire and Bristol Blenheim. Unsuitable hangars from the First World War were demolished, and two concrete runways were built, plus perimeter track, blast pens, increased storage for fuels and oils, and a dedicated armoury. Construction was largely completed in early 1940.

=== Second World War ===
RAF Kenley was one of the three main fighter stations (Kenley, Croydon and Biggin Hill) responsible for the air defence of London during the Battle of Britain in 1940.

RAF Kenley suffered its worst damage in an attack on 18 August 1940. While 15 September is considered by many to be the climax of the Battle of Britain, 18 August is often cited as the costliest or hardest day – the British lost 68 aircraft and the Germans lost 69. At Kenley, two of the remaining three hangars (three had been removed in 1939), other buildings and ten aircraft, including six Hurricanes, were destroyed, while six more, including a Spitfire and two Hurricanes, were damaged. The runways were also heavily cratered by the bombing. The Sector Operations Room had to be moved to an emergency location away from the airfield.

Hammond Innes' book Attack Alarm, published in 1941, was based on his experiences as a Royal Artillery anti-aircraft gunner at RAF Kenley during the Battle of Britain. Innes' novels are marked by attention to accurate detail and the book contains graphic descriptions of the station and attacks on it in 1940.

=== Squadrons ===
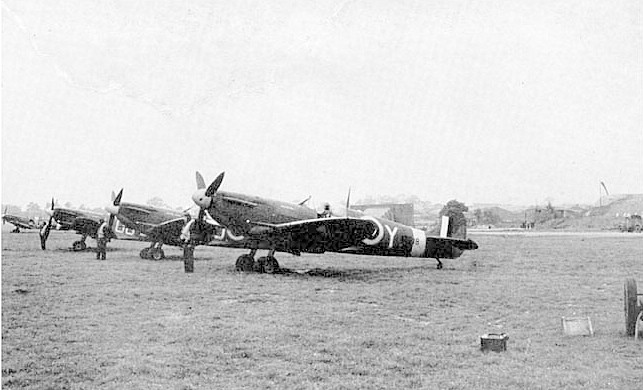
Spitfire Mk. Vbs of No. 485 Squadron RNZAF at RAF Kenley in 1941

The following units were based at RAF Kenley:

- No. 1 Squadron RAF initially between 5 January and 7 April 1941 with the Hurricane I & IIA before returning on 1 June and staying until 14 June 1941.
- No. 3 Squadron RAF between 10 May 1934 and October 1935 with the Bulldog II/IIA then between 28 August 1936 and 1 May 1939 using both the Gloster Gladiator I and the Hurricane I. The squadron returned for the last time on 28 January 1940 staying until 10 May 1940 equipped with the Hurricane I.
- No. 13 Squadron RAF
- No. 17 Squadron RAF
- No. 23 Squadron RAF
- No. 24 Squadron RAF
- No. 32 Squadron RAF
- No. 36 Squadron RAF
- No. 39 Squadron RAF
- No. 46 Squadron RAF
- No. 64 Squadron RAF
- No. 66 Squadron RAF
- No. 80 Squadron RAF
- No. 84 Squadron RAF
- No. 88 (Hong Kong) Squadron RAF
- No. 91 (Nigeria) Squadron RAF
- No. 95 Squadron RAF
- No. 108 Squadron RAF
- No. 110 (Hyderabad) Squadron RAF
- No. 111 Squadron RAF
- No. 116 Squadron RAF
- No. 165 (Ceylon) Squadron RAF
- No. 207 Squadron RAF
- No. 229 Squadron RAF
- No. 253 (Hyderabad State) Squadron RAF
- No. 258 Squadron RAF
- No. 302 Polish Fighter Squadron
- No. 312 (Czechoslovak) Squadron RAF
- No. 350 (Belgian) Squadron RAF
- No. 400 Squadron RCAF
- No. 401 Squadron RCAF
- No. 402 Squadron RCAF
- No. 403 Squadron RCAF
- No. 411 Squadron RCAF
- No. 412 Squadron RCAF
- No. 416 Squadron RCAF
- No. 421 Squadron RCAF
- No. 452 Squadron RAAF
- No. 485 Squadron RNZAF
- No. 501 (County of Gloucester) Squadron AAF
- No. 600 (City of London) Squadron AAF
- No. 602 (City of Glasgow) Squadron AAF
- No. 611 (West Lancashire) Squadron AAF
- No. 615 (County of Surrey) Squadron AAF
- No. 616 (South Yorkshire) Squadron AAF
- No. 661 Squadron RAF
- 4th Fighter Squadron (1942)
- 308th Fighter Squadron (1942)

Other units

- No. 1 Communication Squadron RAF
- No. 1 Group RAF
- No. 2 Mechanical Transport Storage Unit
- No. 6 (Fighter) Group RAF
- No. 7 (Kenley) Aircraft Acceptance Park
- No. 17 (Fighter) Wing RAF
- [No. 17 (Fighter) Sector RAF
- No. 56 Elementary and Reserve Flying Training School RAF
- No. 61 (Eastern) Group RAF
- No. 61 (Eastern Reserve) Group RAF
- No. 61 (Southern Reserve) Group RAF
- No. 61 Group Communication Flight RAF
- No. 61 Fighter Wing RAF
- No. 86 (Communications) Wing RAF
- No. 103 (Air Disarmament) Wing RAF
- No. 127 Airfield Headquarters RAF
- No. 143 Gliding School RAF
- No. 162 Gliding School RAF
- No. 409 Repair & Salvage Unit
- No. 419 (RCAF) Repair & Salvage Unit
- No. 615 Gliding School RAF became No. 615 Volunteer Gliding Squadron RAF
- No. 1335 Wing RAF Regiment
- No. 1336 Wing RAF Regiment
- No. 1957 Reserve Air Observation Post Flight RAF
- No. 1960 Reserve Air Observation Post Flight RAF
- No. 2704 Squadron RAF Regiment
- No. 2721 Squadron RAF Regiment
- No. 2729 Squadron RAF Regiment
- No. 2732 Squadron RAF Regiment
- No. 2738 Squadron RAF Regiment
- No. 2766 Squadron RAF Regiment
- No. 2820 Squadron RAF Regiment
- No. 3201 Servicing Commando
- No. 3207 Servicing Commando
- Fighting Area
- Kenley Aircraft Acceptance Park
- Photographic Experimental Section/Station
- Signals Co-operation Flight RAF
- Surrey Hills Gliding Club
- University of London Air Squadron

=== Pilots ===
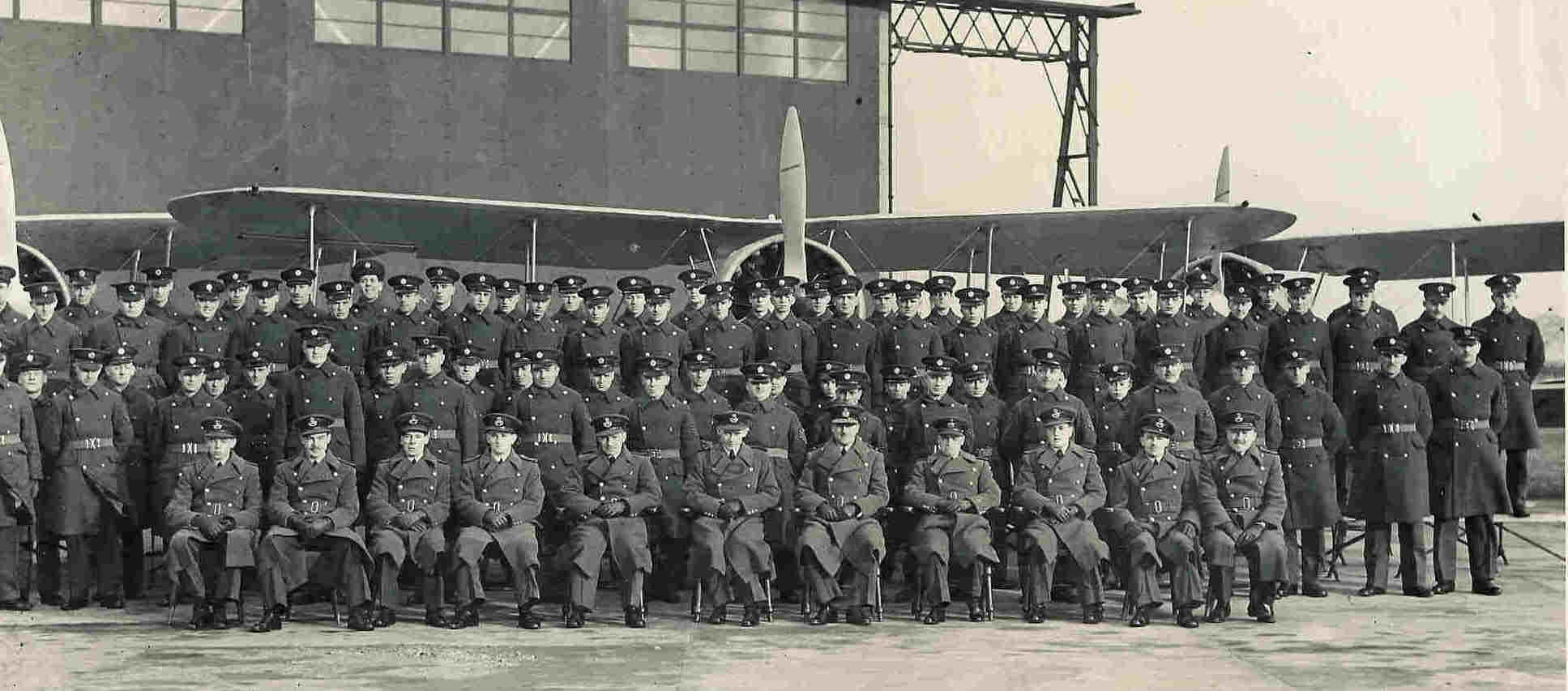
AOC RAF Fighter Command, Air chief marshal Hugh Dowding visit to No. 46 Squadron at RAF Kenley in 1938

Many famous pilots served at Kenley, including the famous South African fighter ace 'Sailor' Malan, Group Captain P. H. 'Dutch' Hugo, C. W. A. Scott (winner of the MacRobertson Air Race) who served there with No. 32 Squadron RAF from 1923 to 1926, and the British ace JE "Johnnie" Johnson, later Air Vice-Marshal, who took over the Canadian wing at Kenley in 1943. P/O Arthur Gerald Donahue, 64 Squadron, flew out of Kenley. Donahue was from St. Charles, Minnesota, USA, and was one of seven Americans to fly and fight in the Battle of Britain. He was shot down 13 August 1940, and suffered burns but later returned to service. Donahue described his experiences in the book, "Tally Ho! Yankee in a Spitfire" published by Macmillan in 1941.

== Postwar ==
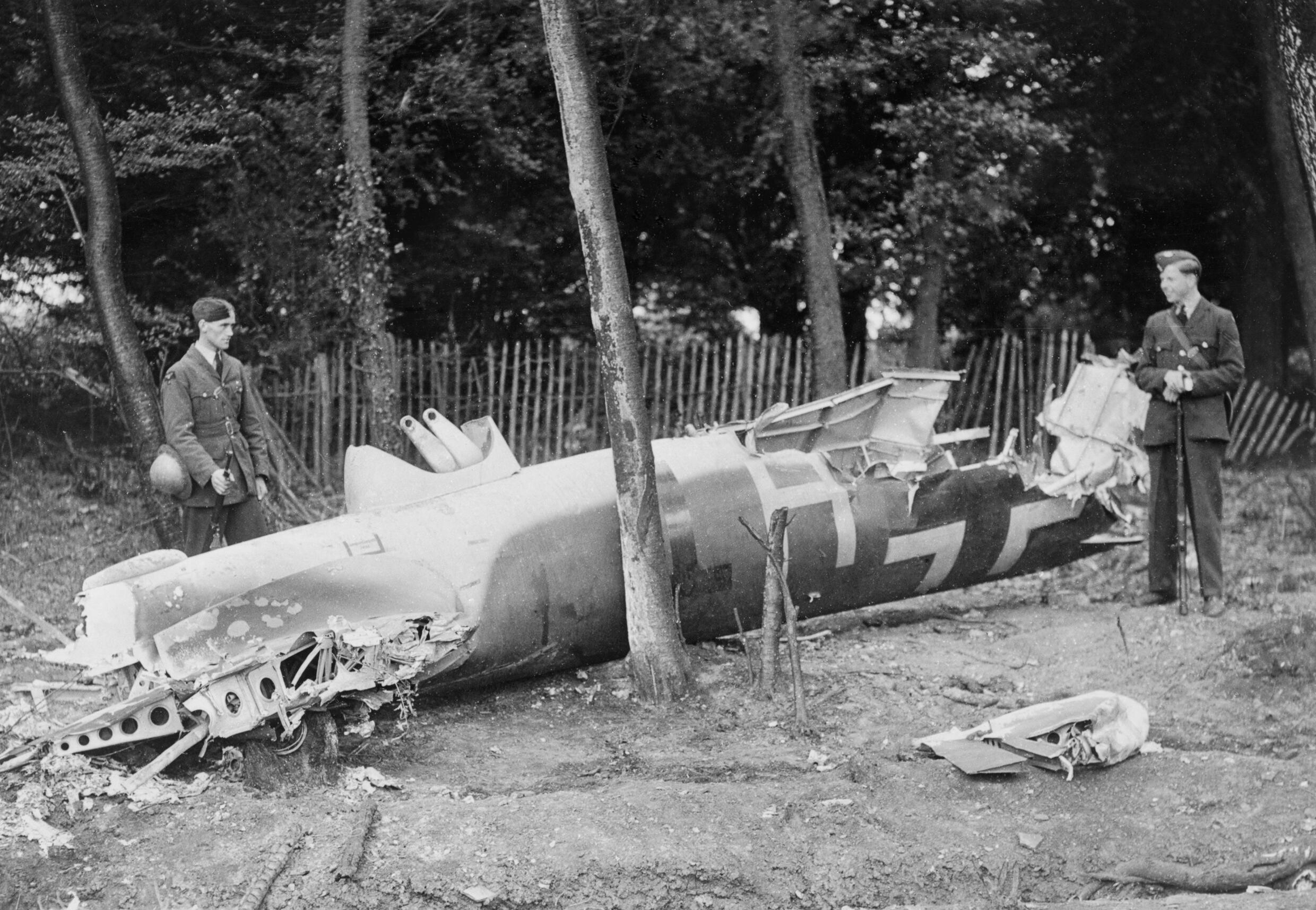
RAF aircraftmen guard the remains of a Luftwaffe Dornier 17 that was shot down during a low-level attack on RAF Kenley on 18 August 1940.

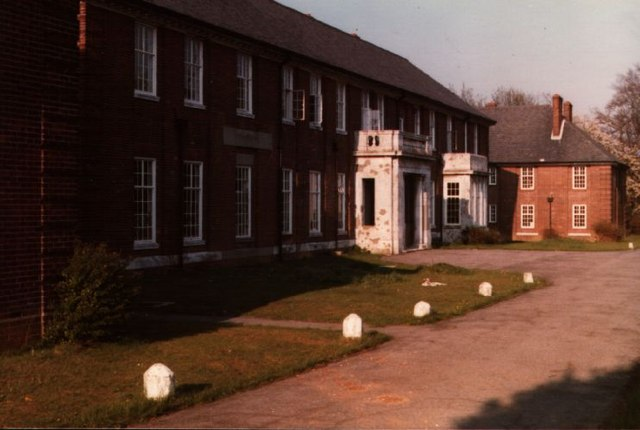
Former RAF Officer's Mess at RAF Kenley Aerodrome in 1979

Although few of the remaining buildings survive and the control tower was demolished after a fire in 1978 along with the remaining hangar, Kenley is thought to be the best preserved of all Second World War RAF fighter stations, with the runway still in its original configuration. English Heritage (in 2000) identified Kenley as "The most complete fighter airfield associated with the Battle of Britain to have survived". The respective councils of Croydon and Tandridge have designated the airfield site as a conservation area (2006).

The south-west corner, previously occupied by married quarters, has been redeveloped with modern high-density housing directly abutting the airfield (the area was excluded from the Green Belt as part of the Tandridge District Local Plan and thus not included within the conservation area). In December 2005, the Grade II Listed former officers' mess building and surrounding land was sold to residential building developer, Comer Homes, and having more recently suffered a fire and vandalism, its future is uncertain as is that of the Royal Air Forces Association (RAFA) Portcullis Club.

Eleven of the original 12 E-shaped blast pens remain in part or whole, as well as the shelters for the servicing personnel. One in particular – forming the background to the RAF memorial – has been fully restored. Since 2004 these structures are protected as scheduled monuments.

Part of the former air station is preserved as a tribute to the service personnel of the Commonwealth and Allied fighter squadrons who shared the honours with the RAF. In a former aircraft parking area in one of the blast pens a memorial was unveiled on 19 August 2000. Dedicated to the Royal Air Force and allied air forces, the inscription reads "RAF Kenley Tribute in Honour of All Personnel Who Served Here 1917–1959".

The aerodrome was used as a location in Angels One Five (1952) and Reach for the Sky (1956), the latter about Douglas Bader who was posted to RAF Kenley in 1930 No. 23 Squadron RAF shortly before his accident in 1931.

== Current use ==
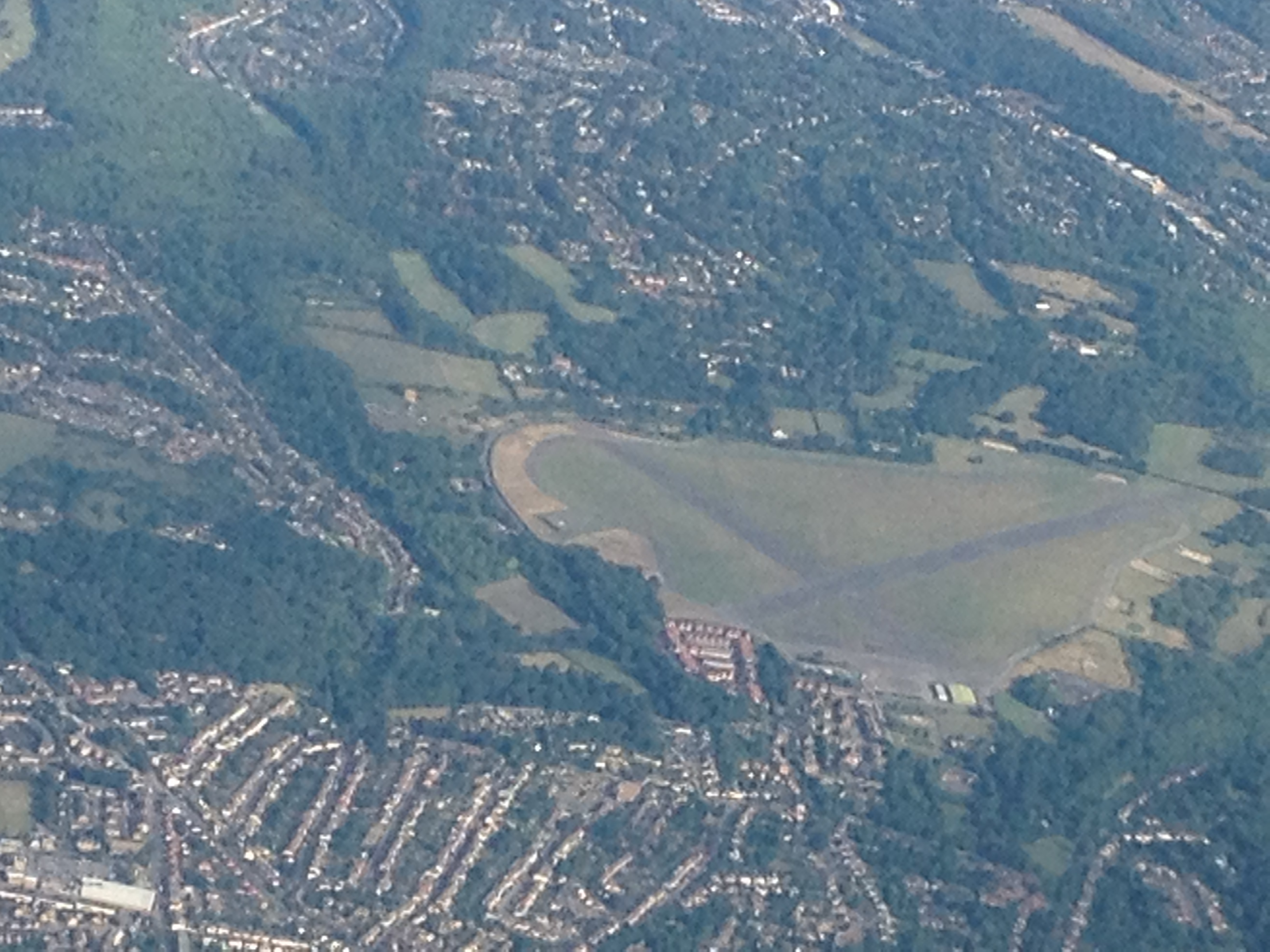
Aerial view of RAF Kenley

RAF Kenley now hosts 615 Volunteer Gliding Squadron, a Unit within the RAF 2 Flying Training School (2 FTS). RAF Kenley is classed as a government aerodrome and is regulated by the Military Aviation Authority (MAA); as such, all flying operations are governed by military regulations and safety standards. An aerodrome operator (AO) is appointed in accordance with MAA regulations, whose role is to actively manage the aerodrome environment to ensure it is safe for the operation of aircraft, and is the focal point for all aerodrome activity. However this function is undertaken remotely by an individual within the HQ of 2 FTS at RAF Syerston.

At the foot of the memorial is inscribed the war-time quote commemorating the Battle of Britain "Never in the field of human conflict, has so much been owed by so many to so few – Winston Churchill 1942."

The airfield is next to the HQ of 450 Kenley Air Cadets.

The airfield is still in use by the Ministry of Defence and Surrey Hills Gliding Club for glider aircraft; however, the use of powered aircraft is currently prohibited.

== See also ==
- List of Battle of Britain airfields
- List of Royal Air Force stations

== Bibliography ==
- Peter Flint (1985), R.A.F. Kenley, Terence Dalton Limited Lavenham Suffolk, ISBN 0-86138-036-3
- Falconer, Jonathan (2012). RAF Airfields of World War 2. UK: Ian Allan Publishing. ISBN 978-1-85780-349-5.
- Jefford, C.G. (1988). RAF Squadrons. A comprehensive record of the movement and equipment of all RAF squadrons and their antecedents since 1912. Shrewsbury: Airlife. ISBN 1-85310-053-6.
