= RAF Staplehurst =

World War II airfield in England

RAF Staplehurst USAAF Station AAF-413
- Near Staplehurst, Kent in England
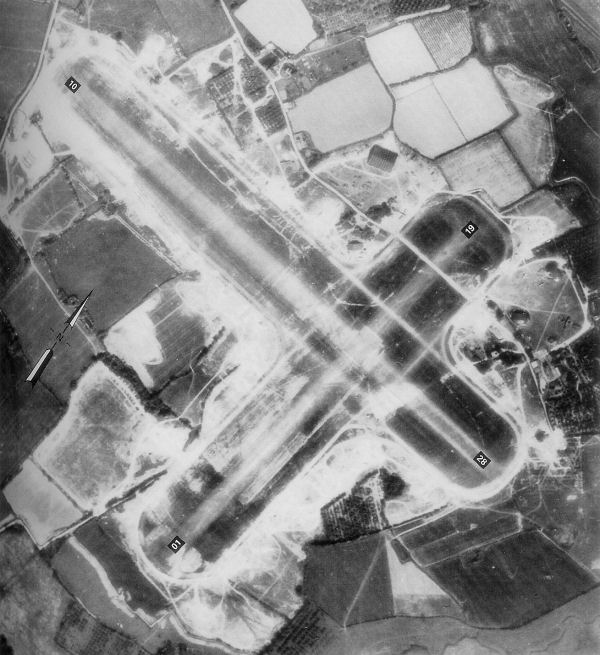
- Staplehurst Airfield, two weeks before D-Day on 21 May 1944. Note the blister hangar just to the west of the 19 runway. The improvised technical site and airfield station is located to the north of the 10 runway.

Site information
- Type: RAF Advanced landing ground
- Code: XS
- Owner: Air Ministry
- Operator: Royal Air Force; Royal Canadian Air Force (1943-1944); United States Army Air Forces (1944)
- Controlled by: RAF Air Defence of Great Britain 1944- * No. 83 Group RAF; Ninth Air Force

Location
- Shown within Kent RAF Staplehurst (the United Kingdom)
- Coordinates: 51°09′42″N 000°34′18″E

Site history
- Built: 1943
- In use: August 1943 - January 1945
- Battles/wars: European theatre of World War II

Airfield information
- Elevation: 30 metres (98 ft) AMSL
Runways
Direction	Length and surface
01/19	Sommerfeld Tracking
10/28	Sommerfeld Tracking

Royal Air Force Staplehurst or more simply RAF Staplehurst is a former Royal Air Force Advanced landing ground located approximately 1 mile (1.6 km) northeast of Staplehurst, Kent, England.

Opened in 1943, Staplehurst was a prototype for temporary Advanced landing grounds built in France after D-Day, and as the Allied forces moved east across France and Germany. It was used by the Royal Air Force, Canadian and the United States Army Air Forces. It was closed in September 1944.

Today the airfield is a mixture of agricultural fields with no recognisable remains, except a memorial now near the site.

== History ==
The USAAF Ninth Air Force required several temporary Advanced landing ground (ALG) along the channel coast prior to the June 1944 Normandy invasion to provide tactical air support for the ground forces landing in France.

The following units were here at some point:

- No. 126 Airfield Headquarters RAF (August - October 1943)
  - No. 401 Squadron RCAF (August - October 1943) flying Supermarine Spitfire VB's
  - No. 411 Squadron RCAF (August - October 1943) flying Supermarine Spitfire VB's
  - No. 412 Squadron RCAF (August - October 1943) flying Supermarine Spitfire VB's
- No. 2703 Squadron RAF Regiment
- No. 3207 Servicing Commando
- No. 3209 Servicing Commando

=== USAAF use ===
Staplehurst was known as USAAF Station AAF-413 for security reasons by the USAAF during the war, and by which it was referred to instead of location. Its USAAF Station Code was "SH".

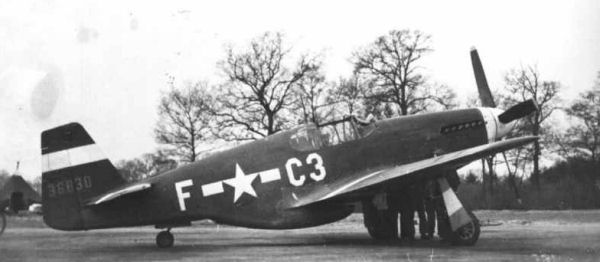
North American P-51B-5 Mustang, Serial 43-6830 of the 382d Fighter Squadron

==== 363rd Fighter Group ====
Staplehurst was chosen to house one of the Ninth Air Force's two North American P-51B Mustang fighter groups (The other being the 354th Fighter Group), and the 363d Fighter Group moved into Staplehurst on 14 April from RAF Rivenhall. The group consisted of the following operational squadrons and fuselage codes:

- 380th Fighter Squadron (A9)
- 381st Fighter Squadron (B3)
- 382nd Fighter Squadron (C3)

On 30 June the 363rd was alerted for movement to the Continent, its new base being the airfield at Maupertus (ALG A-15), near Cherbourg.

== Current use ==
Upon its release from military use, within a year there was little left to indicate that these 400 acres (1.6 km^{2}) to the east of Staplehurst village had once been an active fighter airfield. Today, the farmland that was once RAF Staplehurst is unrecognisable as anything other than farmland. The location of the airfield can only be discerned by looking at the aerial photography and following the path of Chickenden Lane, which runs almost parallel the former main 10/28 runway. A few wartime buildings may be in agricultural use just to the northeast of the former airfield.

== Memorial ==
There is a memorial now at this site located just off Chickenden Lane near the site of the former airfield. It was dedicated on 6 June 2010. It was attended by 95-year-old Col. John R. Ulricson who flew his P-51 "Lolita" from the Airfield, his son retired Army Major C. Bruce Ulricson, who lives in Landaff and the patriarch's grandson, N.H. Army National Guard Major Davis K. Ulricson, of Ashland. Local fundraising efforts included bottles of "Ulricsons Finest Staplehurst Ale" which on the label show Ulricson in front of his "Lolita", which reportedly made him smile. There was a flypast that included a P-51D "Big Beautiful Doll". It was supposed to include two USAF F-15's and the Kent Spitfire, but they did not show up due to weather. The dedication was preceded by a service at the church in Staplehurst.

== See also ==
- List of former Royal Air Force stations
