= Roderick Smith (RCAF officer) =

Canadian flying ace of WWII

- Born: 11 March 1922; Regina, Saskatchewan, Canada
- Died: 16 April 2002 (aged 80); Vancouver, British Columbia, Canada
- Military career
- Allegiance: Canada
- Branch: Royal Canadian Air Force
- Service years: 1940–1945
- Rank: Squadron Leader
- Commands: No. 401 Squadron
- Conflicts: Second World War: Circus offensive; Siege of Malta; Invasion of Normandy
- Awards: Distinguished Flying Cross & Bar
- Other work: Barrister

Roderick Illingworth Alpine Smith, DFC & Bar (11 March 1922 – 16 April 2002) was a flying ace who served in the Royal Canadian Air Force (RCAF) during the Second World War. He was credited with having shot down at least fourteen aircraft.

Born in Regina, Saskatchewan, Smith joined the RCAF in 1940. After his flying training was completed, he was sent to the United Kingdom where he served with the newly formed No. 412 Squadron. In July 1942 he was sent to Malta, where he flew with No. 126 Squadron and achieved his first aerial victories during the siege of the island. At the end of the year, by which time he had been awarded the Distinguished Flying Cross, he was repatriated to the United Kingdom for medical reasons. After period of time spent on instructing duties and then leave in Canada, he returned to operational flying with No. 401 Squadron at the start of 1944. Later in the year he became the squadron's commander but was posted away in late November. He spent the final six months of the war in Canada.

Discharged from the RCAF in June 1945, Smith later undertook tertiary study and became a qualified engineer. He also served in the RCAF Auxiliary, eventually rising to command a squadron until he ended his service in 1952. He subsequently studied law and became a barrister in 1954. He eventually retired in 1987 as a partner in a law firm. His memoirs were published after his death in 2002 at the age of 80.

== Early life ==
Roderick Illingworth Alpine Smith was born in Regina, Saskatchewan, in Canada, on 11 March 1922, the son of Donald Alpine Smith and Blanche Smith. He had two brothers, Jerrold and Donald, and a sister, Wendy. Educated at Lakeview School and Central Collegiate, Smith joined the Royal Canadian Air Force (RCAF) in September 1940. By March the following year he had gained his wings and had been commissioned as a pilot officer. He was duly sent to the United Kingdom to serve in the aerial campaign there.

== Second World War ==
On arrival in the United Kingdom, in May 1941 Smith was posted to No. 58 Operational Training Unit (OTU). The following month, he was assigned to No. 412 Squadron, a newly formed Article XV unit of the RCAF. Equipped with Supermarine Spitfire fighters and based at Digby, the squadron was training up to become operational, which it achieved in early September. As part of No. 12 Group, it participated in the occasional offensive sweep to Europe. From February 1942, it was involved in the Circus offensive.

=== Siege of Malta ===
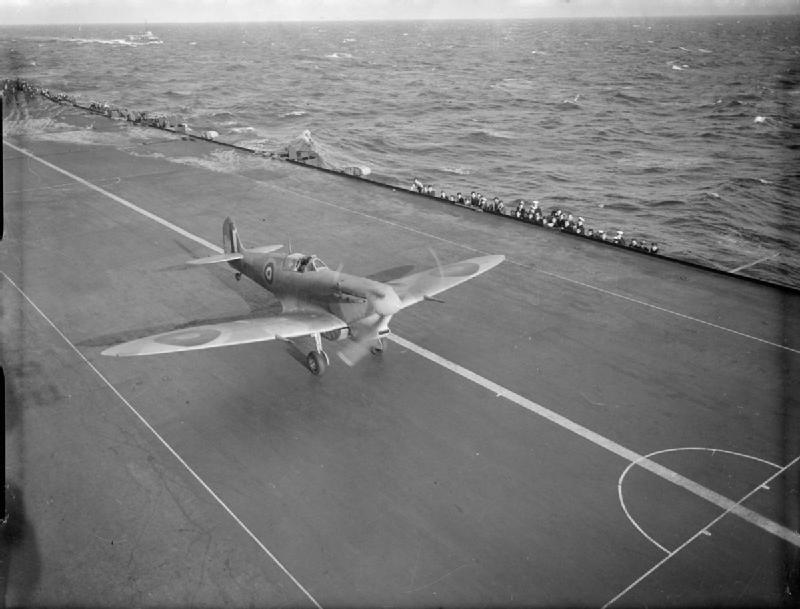
A Spitfire taking off from the deck of HMS Eagle, 1942

In June, Smith, by this time holding the rank of flying officer, was posted to the Mediterranean, sailing aboard the aircraft carrier HMS Eagle which was to deliver a number of Spitfires to reinforce the RAF squadrons serving on Malta. He flew a Spitfire off the ship's flight deck on 15 July and on arrival at Malta, was posted to No. 126 Squadron. To his surprise, his older brother Jerrold, who had also joined the RCAF, was already serving in the squadron. A few days later, Smith achieved his first aerial victory, sharing with Jerrold in the probable destruction of a Junkers Ju 88 medium bomber that was intercepted to the north of Malta. On 24 July he shot down another Ju 88, this time over Malta; the bomber crashed near Luqa. Four days later, while flying a sortie over Kalafrana, he destroyed a further Ju 88.

Smith shot down a Savoia-Marchetti SM.79 medium bomber of the Regia Aeronautica (Italian Air Force) that was attacking a shipping convoy making for Malta on 13 August. His brother failed to return from a sortie a few days previously and Smith was involved in the aerial search for Jerrold, but he was never found. Out of action for a period of time during September due to illness, Smith destroyed a Ju 88 over Malta's Grand Harbour on 11 October and this was followed two days later with the destruction of a Messerschmitt Bf 109 fighter intercepted over Sliema Bay. He damaged a Ju 88 north of St. Paul's Bay on 14 October but the next day was himself shot down by a Bf 109. After baling out and coming down into the sea, he was promptly rescued without injury. Returning to duty, and having been promoted to flight lieutenant, he shot a Bf 109 into the sea on 25 October. He took ill again the next month and was repatriated to the United Kingdom. In recognition of his successes while serving at Malta, he was awarded the Distinguished Flying Cross (DFC).

=== Europe ===
On recovering his health, Smith was tasked with instructing duties, being posted initially to No. 53 OTU and then No. 55 OTU, where he spent several months before taking the Fighter Leaders Course in September 1943. The next month he returned to Canada for a period of leave. By the start of 1944, Smith was back in the United Kingdom and was posted to No. 401 Squadron with which he flew as a supernumerary pilot. At this time, the squadron, operating Spitfires, was carrying escort missions and also training for a fighter-bomber role. In April he transferred to a former unit, No. 412 Squadron, to take command of one of its flights. His new unit was flying Spitfire fighter-bombers but during the invasion of Normandy, it flew aerial cover over the landing beaches and then subsequently operated in support of the Allied ground forces as they advanced inland. On 7 July, while the squadron carried out a reconnaissance near Falaise, Smith destroyed a Focke-Wulf Fw 190 fighter, its pilot baling out before the aircraft crashed near Argentan.

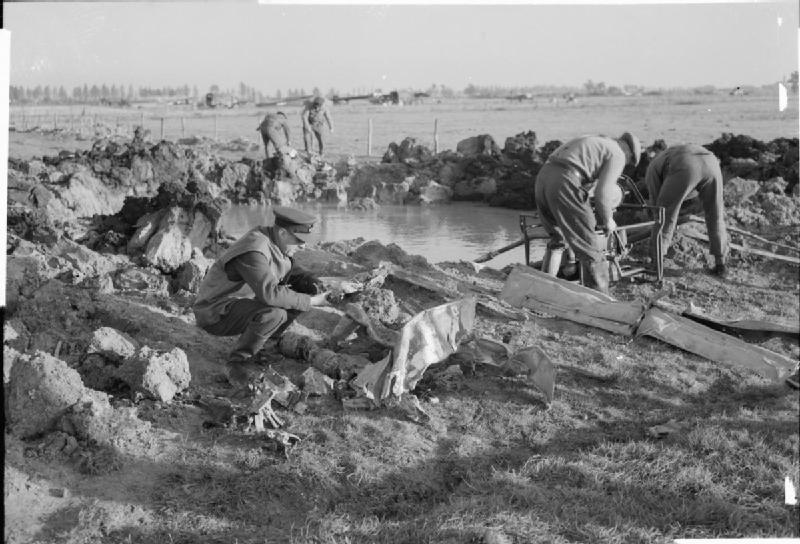
RAF officers inspect the wreckage of the Me 262 that was shot down by Smith and his fellow pilots on 5 October 1944

While flying to the east of Nijmegen on 26 September Smith engaged and shot down two Bf 109s. The next day, while on a sortie in the same region, he again destroyed two Bf 109s. Promptly promoted to squadron leader, he was given command of No. 401 Squadron. At the time based at Le Culot Airfield as part of the Second Tactical Air Force, the squadron flew in a ground attack role. On 29 September, Smith, in one of his first sorties as the commander of his unit, destroyed two Bf 109s in a large scale dogfight involving 30 or more fighters of the Luftwaffe to the east of Nijmegen. On 5 October he was leading a patrol in the Nijmegen area, and spotted a Messerschmitt Me 262 jet fighter. With four other pilots, he pursued the Me 262. All of the chasing Spitfires scored hits on the jet fighter and it caught fire. The pilot baled out, leaving the Me 262 to crash into the ground. Smith and his four pilots were credited with its shared destruction, the first aerial victory by British forces over a Me 262. He was subsequently awarded a Bar to his DFC; the citation, published in The London Gazette on 24 November, read:

Since being awarded the Distinguished Flying Cross, Squadron Leader Smith has completed numerous sorties against the enemy. In four days he achieved the remarkable feat of destroying seven enemy aircraft. As squadron commander this officer led 412 Squadron on six missions in three days, during which period it destroyed twenty-seven enemy aircraft and damaged nine others. This was accomplished during the enemy's persistent efforts to destroy bridges in the Arnhem and Nijmegen area which were vital to our ground forces.

— London Gazette, No. 36810, 24 November 1944

By the time of the award of the Bar, Smith had been taken off operations and in December he returned to Canada. He ended the war credited with having definitively shot down fourteen aircraft, one of which being shared with other pilots. He also shared in the probable destruction of one aircraft and damaged one.

== Later life ==
Returning to civilian life in June 1945, Smith studied engineering at McGill University, becoming a chartered professional engineer. During his studies he joined the RCAF Auxiliary, serving with No. 401 Squadron, later being promoted to wing commander and leading No. 411 Squadron until 1952, at which time he ended his military service. At this stage of his life, Smith was studying law at Osgoode Hall in Toronto and graduated with a Bachelor of Laws in 1953. Moving to Vancouver, he became a barrister and solicitor the following year and commenced practicing law, rising to become a partner at Campney Owen & Murphy by the time of his retirement in 1987.

Smith retained an interest in military affairs, attending reunions and engaging with his former adversaries in the Luftwaffe. He participated in the semi-centennial commemorations of the Siege of Malta and the D-Day landings. He worked on his memoirs but died in Vancouver on 16 April 2002 before they were completed. His memoir, which also discussed his brother Jerrold, was subsequently completed by the military aviation historian Christopher Shores and published by Grub Street as The Spitfire Smiths: A Unique Story of Brothers in Arms in 2008.
