= No. 126 Wing RAF =

No. 126 Wing RAF No. 126 Airfield Headquarters RAF No. 126 (RCAF) (Fighter) Wing RAF
- Active: 1943-44; 1944-46
- Country: United Kingdom
- Branch: Royal Air Force
- Type: Wing
- Last base: B.74 Utersen

No. 126 Wing RAF is a former Royal Air Force wing that was operational during the Second World War.

== Second World War ==
No. 126 (RCAF) (Fighter) Wing RAF was formed on 12 May 1944 at RAF Tangmere within No. 15 Sector RAF, No. 83 Group RAF (83 Grp), RAF Second Tactical Air Force (2 TAF). Later it was moved to No. 17 Sector RAF, (83 Grp, 2 TAF). It moved to B.3 Ste.Croix-Sur-Mer on 16 June 1944 then to B.4 Beny-Sur-Mer, B.18 Cristot, B.28 Eureux, B.44 Poix, Evere, B.68 Le Culot, B.84 Rips, B.80 Volkel, B.88 Heesch, B.108 Rheine, B.116 Wunstorf, B.152 Fassberg and finally B.74 Utersen where the wing was disbanded on 31 March 1946.

Squadrons controlled:

- No. 401 Squadron RCAF (12 May 1944 to 10 July 1945)
- No. 411 Squadron RCAF (12 May 1944 to 31 March 1946)
- No. 412 Squadron RCAF (12 May 1944 to 31 March 1946)
- No. 442 Squadron RCAF (12 July 1944 to 31 March 1946)
- No. 402 Squadron RCAF (27 December 1944 to July 1945)
- No. 416 Squadron RCAF (7 July 1945 to 31 March 1946)
- No. 443 Squadron RCAF (7 July 1945 to 31 March 1946)

== History of No. 126 Airfield Headquarters ==
The unit was formed on 4 July 1943 at RAF Redhill within No. 17 (Fighter) Wing RAF. It moved to RAF Staplehurst on 6 August 1943, RAF Biggin Hill on 13 October 1943 and finally RAF Tangmere on 15 April 1944 where it was disbanded on 12 May 1944.

Squadrons controlled:

- No. 401 Squadron RCAF
- No. 411 Squadron RCAF
- No. 412 Squadron RCAF

== See also ==
- List of wings of the Royal Air Force
