= George Keefer =

Canadian flying ace of WWII

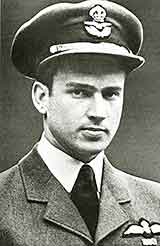
- Keefer, 1942–1943
- Born: 11 July 1921; New York City, New York, United States
- Died: January 1985 (aged 63); Montreal, Québec, Canada
- Military career
- Allegiance: Canada
- Branch: Royal Canadian Air Force
- Service years: 1940–1947
- Rank: Wing Commander
- Commands: No. 412 Squadron; No. 126 Fighter Wing; No. 125 Fighter Wing
- Conflicts: Second World War: Western Desert campaign; Invasion of Normandy; Western Allied invasion of Germany
- Awards: Distinguished Service Order & Bar; Distinguished Flying Cross & Bar; Croix de Guerre (France); Airman's Cross (The Netherlands)
- Other work: Aerospace executive

George Keefer, DSO & Bar, DFC & Bar (11 July 1921 – January 1985) was a flying ace who served in the Royal Canadian Air Force (RCAF) during the Second World War. He was credited with having shot down at least twelve aircraft

Born in New York City to Canadian parents, Keefer joined the RCAF in late 1940. Once his training was completed, he was sent to the United Kingdom to serve with the Royal Air Force. After further training, he was posted to the Middle East to serve with No. 274 Squadron. He spent several months with the squadron and achieved a number of aerial victories before being assigned to instructing duties. He returned to the United Kingdom in early 1943 and after a few months resumed operational flying with a posting to the RCAF's No. 412 Squadron. He took command of the unit soon after his arrival there, and shot down further aircraft on sorties to occupied Europe. Promoted to wing commander in April 1944, he became leader of No. 126 Fighter Wing, leading it in operations in support of the invasion of Normandy. He subsequently led No. 125 Fighter Wing in the final stages of the war in Europe. He remained in the RCAF until 1947 and in civilian life, he worked in the aerospace industry. At the time of his sudden death in 1985, he was running a manufacturing company.

== Early life ==
George Clinton Keefer was born in New York City, New York, in the United States of America on 11 July 1921. His parents, Canadian citizens, subsequently relocated to Charlottetown on Prince Edward Island in Canada. Once Keefer finished his schooling, he returned to the United States in 1939 to study engineering at Yale University. He broke off his tertiary education after a year, enlisting in the Royal Canadian Air Force (RCAF) in October 1940.

== Second World War ==
Keefer underwent flight training in Canada, gaining his wings in April 1941 and receiving a commission as a pilot officer. Two months later, he was sent to the United Kingdom to join in the war effort there, serving with the Royal Air Force. After a period of time at No. 59 Operational Training Unit, in September he was posted to No. 274 Squadron.

=== Western Desert campaign ===
At the time Keefer joined the unit, No. 274 Squadron was serving in the Middle East. It was based in Egypt at Mariut and operated Hawker Hurricane fighters, providing aerial protection for Royal Navy shipping and bomber escorts. From November to December 1941, No. 274 Squadron flew extensively during Operation Crusader, the Allied advance into Libya. On 7 December, Keefer achieved his first aerial victories, destroying a Macchi C.200 fighter of the Regia Aeronautica (Italian Air Force), and damaging a second, to the south west of El Adem. The next day he shot down a Messerschmitt Bf 109 fighter in the same area. On 21 December, flying over the Gulf of Bomba, he destroyed a Junkers Ju 88 medium bomber.

Keefer probably destroyed a Bf 109 on 25 May 1942 southwest of Gazala. On 4 June, he was involved in the rescue of a South African pilot who had been shot down near Bir Hakeim, landing nearby to collect and fly him back to his airfield, both men squeezed into the cockpit of Keefer's Hurricane. Four days later Keefer shot down a Macchi C.202 fighter in the same area. He claimed a Bf 109 as damaged on 12 June, and then four days later, east of Tobruk, he destroyed a Bf 109. On 17 June, he damaged a MC.202. No. 274 Squadron flew extensively during the First Battle of El Alamein and on 10 July, he claimed two MC.202s as damaged near El Alamein. A week later, a Bf 109 was also damaged in the same area by Keefer.

=== Europe ===
In August 1942, Keefer was posted to No. 1 Middle East Training School, remaining here for six months. During this time, he was awarded the Distinguished Flying Cross. Returning to the United Kingdom in February 1943, three months later he was posted to No. 416 Squadron for a brief period before proceeding onto No. 412 Squadron where he was appointed a flight commander.

No. 412 Squadron was based at Perranporth and operated the Supermarine Spitfire Mk V fighter. It was soon to become part of the Second Tactical Air Force (2TAF), paired up with two other squadrons of the RCAF to form a fighter wing. On 12 June, while the squadron was on a shipping reconnaissance, Keefer damaged a Focke-Wulf Fw 190 fighter to the north east of Île de Batz. The following month, he was forced to bale out over the English Channel after the engine of his Spitfire failed. He was rescued by a RAF Supermarine Walrus flying boat later in the day. At around this time, he took command of the squadron and it soon began to upgrade to the Spitfire Mk IXb. Flying one of these, he claimed a Fw 190 as probably destroyed to the south of Knokke on 1 December. In April 1944, he was promoted to wing commander and appointed leader of No. 126 Wing, succeeding Buck McNair in this role. He was also awarded a Bar to his DFC.

As part of the 2TAF and beginning to operate in a fighter-bomber role, Keefer's command was heavily engaged in operations in anticipation of the invasion of Normandy. On D-Day itself, No. 126 Wing provided aerial cover to the east of the beachhead up to Le Havre but saw little opposition. On 7 June, Keefer's wing encountered several Luftwaffe aircraft and he destroyed a Ju 88 and a Fw 190, two of twelve German aircraft claimed by pilots of his wing during the day. A few days later, No. 126 Fighter Wing began operating from airstrips within the beachhead, using these as re-fuelling posts in between patrols before returning to their base in the United Kingdom at the end of the day. It began permanently flying from Beny-sur-Me in France on 18 June.

With the fighter wing supporting the Allied ground forces as they advanced inland, Keefer destroyed a Messerschmitt Bf 110 heavy fighter south of Caen on 25 June and then two days later shot down a Bf 109 in the Beaumont region. The following month he was rested and went to Canada on leave. He returned to active duty in September with a posting to London at the headquarters of RACF Overseas. In October, he was awarded the Distinguished Service Order (DSO). The published citation read:

This officer has completed many sorties since being awarded a Bar to the Distinguished Flying Cross and his record is outstanding. Within the past few months he has led large formations of aircraft on air operations during which forty enemy aircraft have been destroyed. The successes obtained reflect the greatest credit on the skill, gallantry and resolution of Wing Commander Keefer. This officer has been responsible for the destruction of eight hostile aircraft.

— London Gazette, No. 36756, 20 October 1944

Keefer returned to a command post with an appointment as the leader of No. 125 Fighter Wing in November. At the time, the wing was supporting the Allied advance into Belgium, Holland and Germany. On 2 March 1945 he destroyed a Bf 109 north of Rheine and a second on 19 March, this time over Rheine Airfield. He caught and damaged a Fw 190 over Hagenow Airfield on 16 April and then two days later, while attacking Parchim Airfield, destroyed five Bf 109s on the ground. On 20 April he destroyed a Bf 109 at Wittstock and then, close to Pritzwalk, he shot down a Fw 190, his final aerial victory of the war. In July, he was awarded a Bar to his DSO. He was one of four RCAF personnel to receive medal bars to both the DFC and the DSO. He was also recognised by the governments of France and Netherlands for his war service, being awarded the Croix de Guerre with a Star and Airman's Cross respectively.

Keefer ended the war credited with having definitively shot down twelve German and Italian aircraft, probably destroying two others, and damaging nine aircraft. He was also credited with destroying five aircraft on the ground.

== Later life ==
Keefer remained in the RCAF in the immediate postwar period, returning to Canada in August 1945. He served initially at the Joint Chiefs of Staff in Washington, D.C. as a Canadian representative before taking a course at the RCAF Staff College. He left the RCAF in February 1947 and joined an aviation company in Montreal. Four years later, he started working for Canadair in a management position, eventually rising to be a vice-president with the company before resigning to start up his own business. He purchased a plastics company, Plastal Manufacturing, that made components for the aviation industry; under his management it made parts for major aircraft manufacturers, including McDonnell Douglas. He died suddenly in January 1985.
