= 402 Squadron =

- 402^{e} Escadron
- Active: 1932–1945; 1946–present
- Country: Canada
- Branch: Royal Canadian Air Force
- Role: Training
- Part of: 17 Wing
- Garrison/HQ: CFB Winnipeg
- Motto: We stand on guard
- Battle honours: Defence of Britain, 1941–1944; English Channel and North Sea, 1941–1944; Fortress Europe, 1941–1944; Dieppe; France and Germany, 1944–1945; Normandy, 1944; Arnhem; Rhine
- Website: canada.ca/en/air-force/corporate/squadrons/402-squadron.html

Insignia
- Squadron badge: Argent a standing grizzly bear totem of the North Pacific Coast Natives proper

Aircraft flown
- Trainer: CT-142 Dash 8

402 "City of Winnipeg" Squadron (French: 402^{e} Escadron) is a Royal Canadian Air Force squadron based in Winnipeg, Manitoba, Canada

== Pre-war history ==
402 Squadron began on 5 October 1932 as Number 12 Army Co-operation Squadron, a unit of the non-permanent active Air Force. During the early years, meetings were held in Minto Armories, while flying facilities were based at Stevenson Field, now Winnipeg James Armstrong Richardson International Airport. The aircraft flown included a number of Avro Tutors, de Havilland Gipsy Moths and a few other light aircraft. On 15 November 1937, No. 12 Army Cooperation Squadron was renumbered No. 112 Army Cooperation Squadron, flying a variety of aircraft types including the Avro 626 and de Havilland Tiger Moth.

== Second World War ==
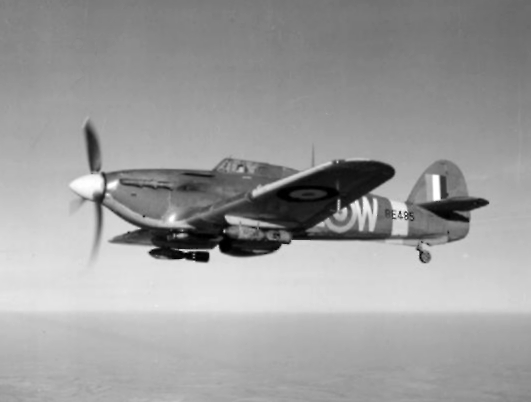
A 402 Sqn Hurricane IIE, in 1941.

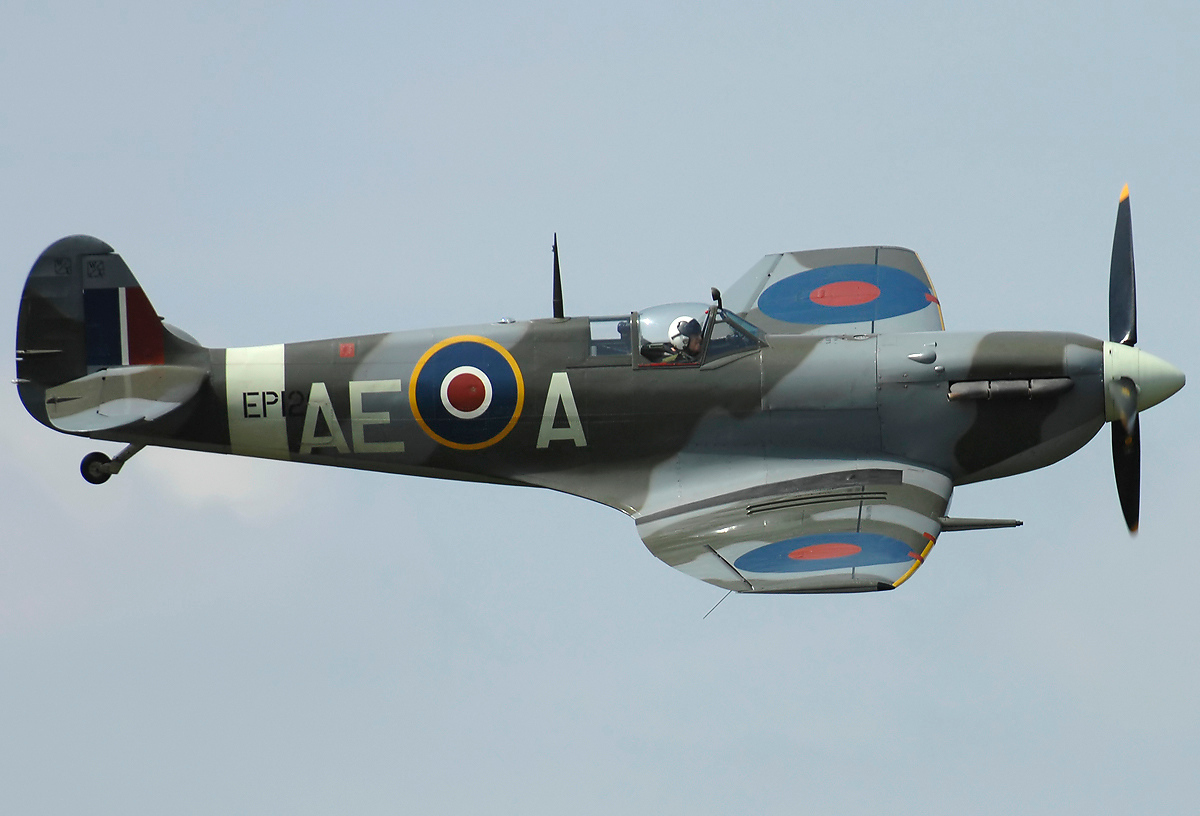
Supermarine Spitfire Vb number EP120 (2010). This aircraft was allocated to several squadrons during World War 2, including 402, and destroyed seven Axis aircraft. It is currently painted in the markings it carried when serving with 402 Squadron

After the outbreak of World War II, No. 112 Squadron was sent to Ottawa in February 1940, and re-equipped with the Westland Lysander, stocks of which were left behind when No. 110 Squadron was posted overseas. (Note: Prior to leaving for Ottawa, the Mayor presented squadron members with a ceremonial pin and gave the squadron the name, "City of Winnipeg".) The squadron was likewise sent to Europe on 30 June 1940 with the intention to have No. 112 Squadron become part of the British Expeditionary Force but the decision was made that Army Co-operation squadrons were not needed in France, and the squadron was re-deployed to coastal defence duties in England.

On 11 December 1940, the squadron was re-designated No. 2 Squadron RCAF and equipped with the Hawker Hurricane Mk. I. Finally, in March 1941, while stationed at RAF Digby, Lincolnshire, England the squadron was renumbered as No. 402 Squadron RCAF to comply with Article XV and re-equipped with the Hurricane Mk. II the following May and then Hurricane Mk.IIBs in June. With these, it began training to become the first "Hurribomber" unit, commencing operations in this role in November 1941, carrying pairs of 250 lb bombs beneath the wings.

In March 1942, the Squadron resumed its fighter role moving to RAF Colerne and converting to Supermarine Spitfire Mk.Vbs. Cross-Channel Ramrod and Rodeo sorties from various bases followed, notably RAF Kenley and RAF Redhill, until August when it received Spitfire Mk.IXs, employing these over Dieppe on 19 August 1942.

A move back to RAF Digby in March 1943 brought a return to Spitfire Mk.Vs, which were flown from a variety of other airfields right up to and during the Battle of Normandy, when it operated from a temporary airfield at Horne in Surrey, and from RAF Westhampnett (now Chichester/Goodwood Airfield) and RAF Merston in West Sussex. For Operation Overlord (the Allied invasion of Normandy in June 1944) it operated as part of Air Defence of Great Britain, though under the operational control of RAF Second Tactical Air Force mainly in a fighter-bomber role. Spitfire Mk.IXs were again received in July, but their stint with the squadron was brief, as in early August 1944, a move was made to Hawkinge where the squadron re-equipped with Griffon-engine Spitfire Mk. XIVs and operations against V-1 flying bombs were commenced, with five victories confirmed.

Following a change back to operations over Europe on 25 August 1944, including reconnaissance and bomber escort, 402 continued to see regular action against Luftwaffe aircraft.

At the end of September 1944, the Squadron was posted to the Second Tactical Air Force in Belgium, joining No. 125 Wing RCAF. A move to Grave in the Netherlands followed, where the first victories were claimed above Nijmegen on 6 October 1944. In December, the Squadron joined No. 126 Wing RCAF to fly alongside the Spitfire Mk. IXs of the other squadrons in the Wing. The end of hostilities in May 1945 found the unit on German soil at the former Luftwaffe Military Airfield Wunstorf between Neustadt am Rübenberge and Wunstorf, with total victories for the war of 49½ aircraft, 19 victories being claimed in April 1945 alone. The code letters carried by the Squadron during this period were "AE". The Squadron disbanded at RAF Fassberg in the British occupation zone of Germany on 10 July 1945.

== Wartime aircraft ==
- Hurricane Mk.I (April 1941 – May 1941)
- Hurricane Mk.IIa (May 1941 – April 1942)
- Hurricane Mk.IIb (June 1941 – April 1942)
- Spitfire Mk.Vb (April 1942 – May 1942)
- Spitfire Mk.IXc (May 1942 – April 1943)
- Spitfire Mk.Vc (April 1943 – June 1944)
- Spitfire Mk.IXc (July 1944 – August 1944)
- Spitfire Mk.XIVe (August 1944 – June 1945)
- Spitfire XVI (June 1945 – July 1945)
- Spitfire XIX E (Kill recorded by S/Lt K.S. Sleep Feb 8 1945 over Coesfeld, Germany)

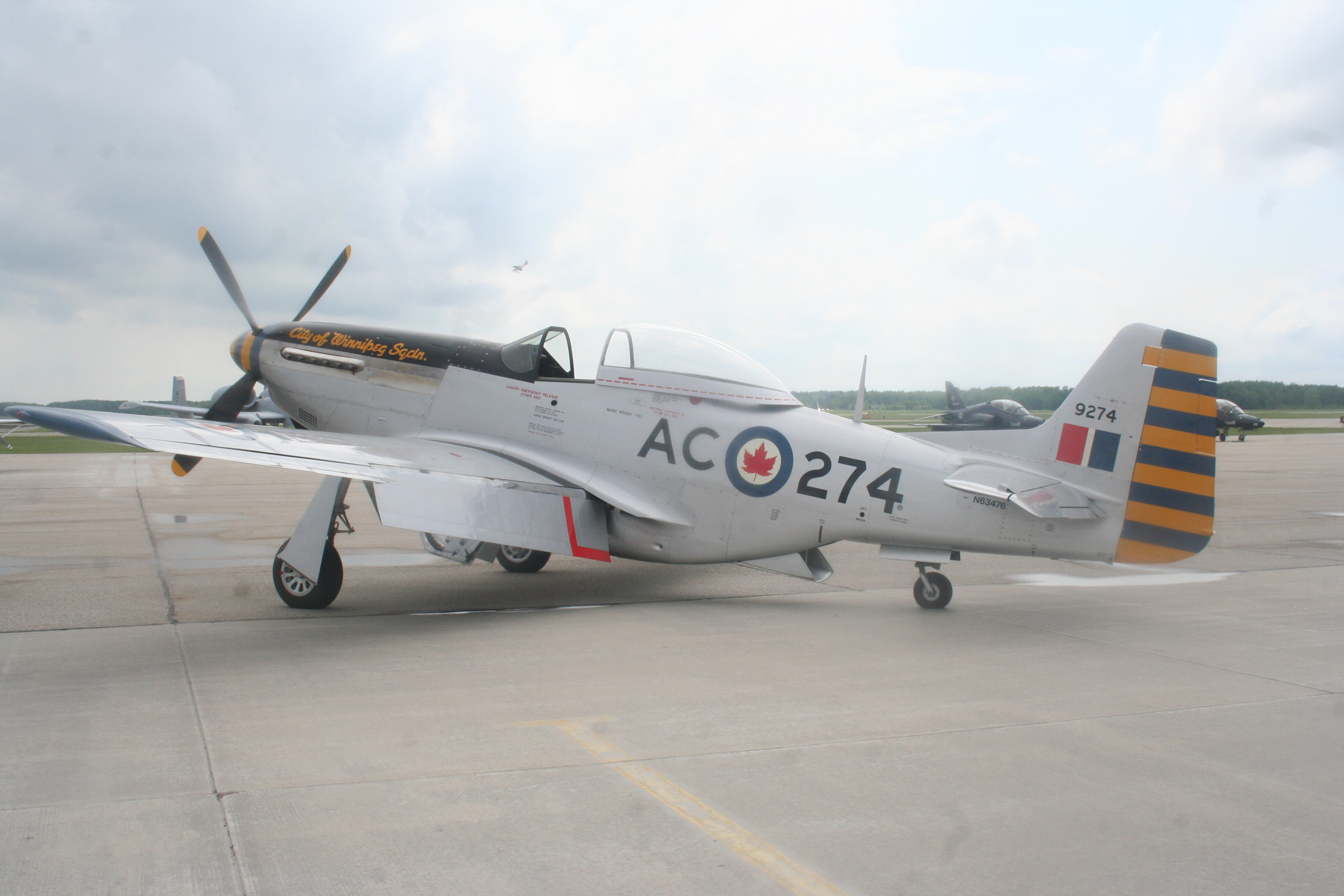
A later P-51D Mustang painted in 402 Sqn Mustang IV scheme, c. 1051.

== Cold War ==
The squadron was re-formed as 402 (Fighter Bomber) Squadron on 15 April 1946, North American Harvard Mk. II trainers initially in preparation for a transition to a new role. For two years, parading two nights each week and on weekends, in addition to ground training on a variety of subjects, including lectures on jet aircraft and engines, 402 carried out air training on Harvards. For a short period, the de Havilland Mosquito was considered as the squadron's new aircraft, but eventually 402 converted to a fighter role on 1 March 1947, equipped with de Havilland Vampire F.3s. With the arrival of the Vampire, in addition to interception and tactical training exercises, 402 Squadron took part in many air shows. On 18 September 1950, the title "City of Winnipeg" was added to the squadron name.

During the early postwar years, a large part of 402 Squadron's training was conducted in the form of summer camps held throughout western Canada. In 1951, it was converted to a fighter-bomber squadron, the squadron receiving the North American Mustang Mk. IV (P-51D series). November 1954 saw the delivery of the first Canadair Silver Star Mk. III to 402 Squadron in anticipation of a switch to this type which could be operated as an armed version of the standard trainer. The Mustang, However, was retained until its retirement in 1957.

In 1957, the squadron changed from a fighter-bomber role to become 402 "City of Winnipeg" (Transport) Squadron, initially equipped with eight Beech CT-128 (C-45) Expeditors. In April 1960, the Squadron was equipped with two de Havilland Canada CSR-123 (DHC-3 Otter) aircraft. The Otter proved to be a highly versatile aircraft and greatly increased the scope of squadron operations. On 1 April 1961, 402 Squadron was transferred to Air Transport Command. This change brought the additional responsibility of the provision of regular service flights from Winnipeg, west to Saskatoon, Saskatchewan, as well as to many northern points. By 1964, two additional Otters had been added to the Squadron inventory.

== Unification ==
The squadron's name was changed in 1969 to 402 Air Reserve Squadron based at CFB Winnipeg. By that point, a further two Otters had joined the fleet for a total of six. Tragically, in early summer 1974, an Otter was lost in a fatal crash, that claimed the life of Captain Jack Reeve. The following year, the Squadron traded their Otters for Douglas CC-129 Dakotas (C-47A/B Skytrain). Initially receiving five out of storage; by 1980, the squadron would be operating nine examples of the venerable Dakota in the light transport, search and rescue operations, support for the Canadian Forces SkyHawks Parachute Team, Air Cadet familiarization and VIP transport roles, becoming the last unit in the Canadian Forces to fly the type.

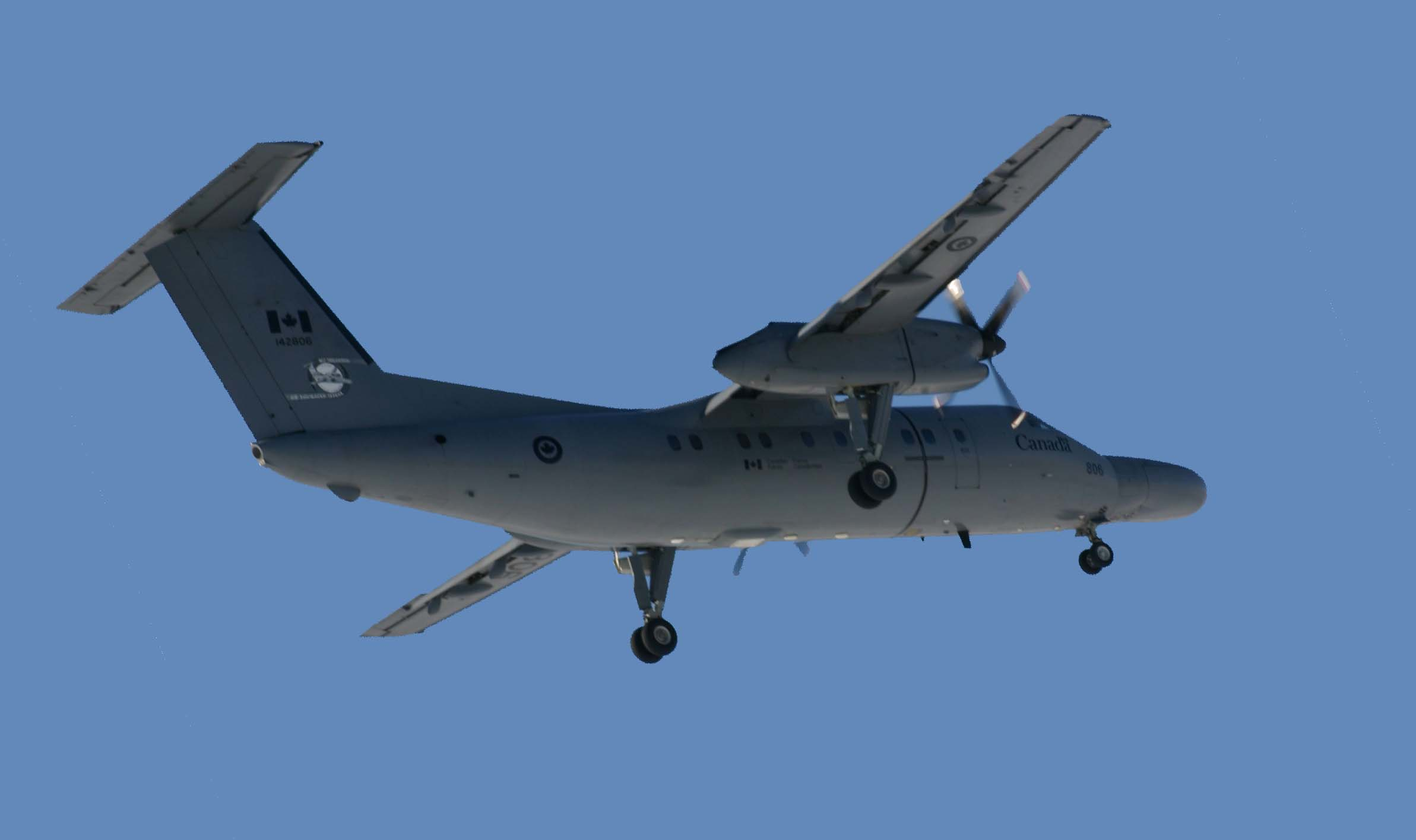
CT142 Dash 8 "Gonzo" from 402 Squadron, Winnipeg, Manitoba.

== Present ==
In the late 1980s, the name changed to 402 "City of Winnipeg" Transport and Training Squadron with the de Havilland Canada CC/CT-142 Dash 8 used to provide light transport and training for the Canadian Forces Air Navigation School (CFANS). In 2000, the two CC-142 Dash 8 light transport aircraft were retired and sold into the private sector in 2002, leaving 402 operating only the CT-142 Dash 8s, affectionately nicknamed "Gonzo" operating in the air navigation training role. By June 2009, and the changing demands of air forces worldwide, the training was adapted to include airborne electronic sensor operators (AESOPs) as well as air navigators now being called air combat systems officers (ACSOs). With the change in the trade name, CFANS became 1 Canadian Forces Flight Training School (1CFFTS). 402 Squadron and 1CFFTS continued to work together to provide ab-initio training. On 14 August 2015, 1CFFTS was amalgamated into 402 Squadron, who took over the full training syllabus alongside the aircraft maintenance and pilot employment. 402 Squadron continues the long tradition of training Commonwealth partners from the United Kingdom, Australia and New Zealand, as well as NATO allies from Germany and Norway. The program has further expanded to include, among others, Singapore and South Korea.

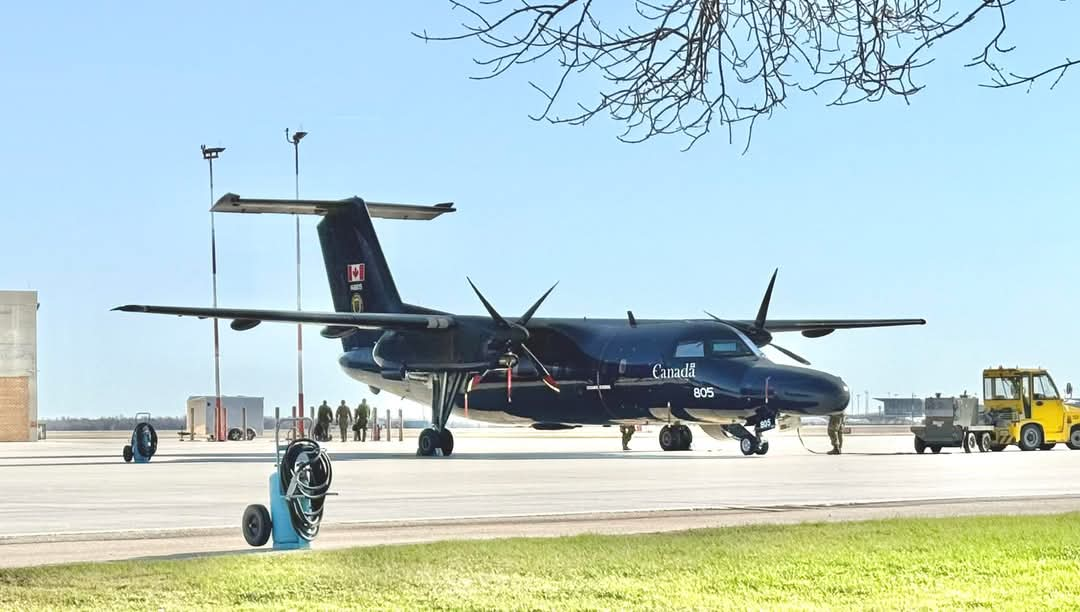
CT‑142805 on the ramp between missions at Winnipeg.
