= Bény-sur-Mer =

- Commune
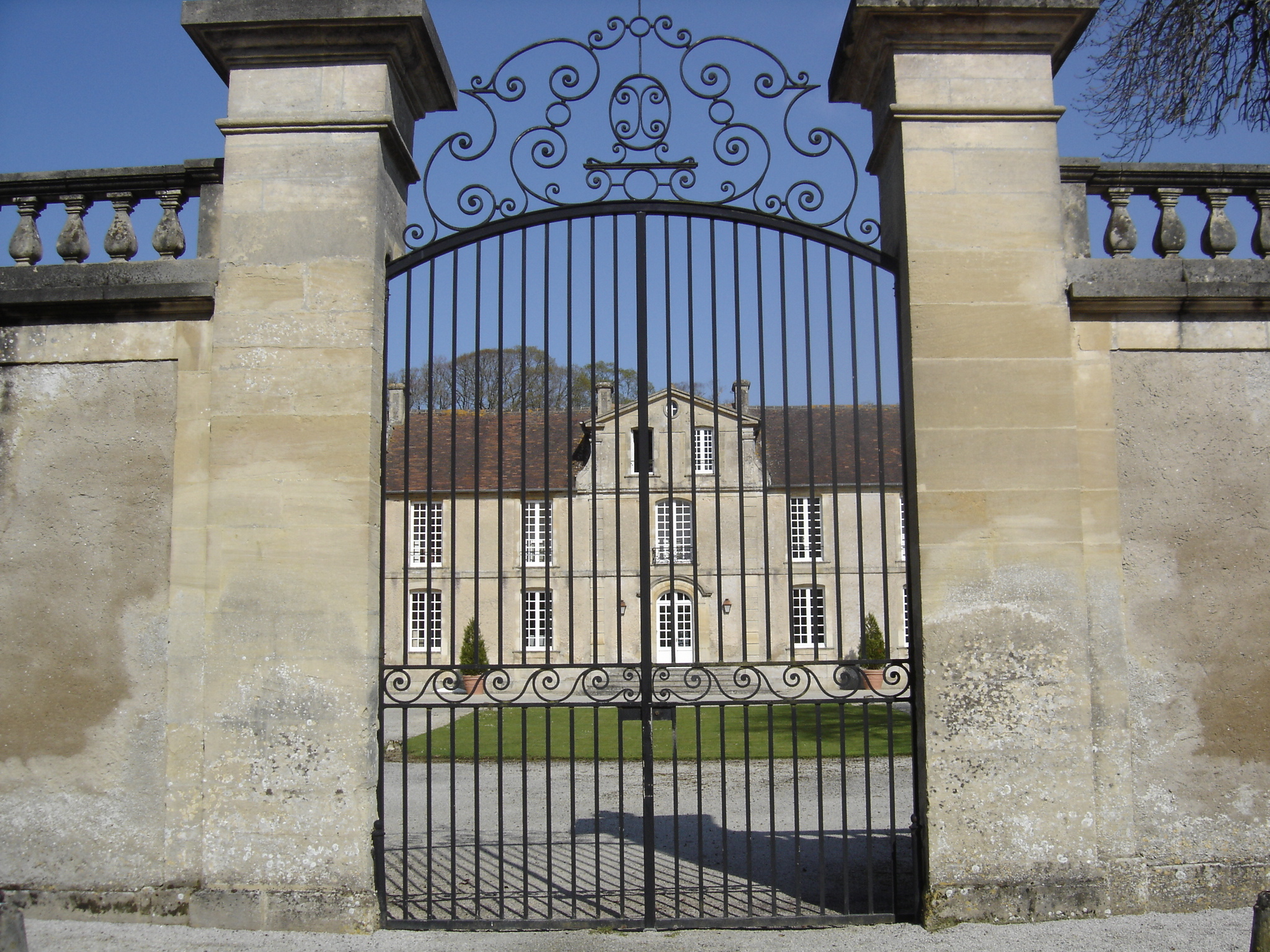
- Chateau of Tournebu

- Coat of arms
- Location of Bény-sur-Mer
- Location within France Location within Normandy
- Coordinates: 49°17′24″N 0°26′03″W
- Country: France
- Region: Normandy
- Department: Calvados
- Arrondissement: Bayeux
- Canton: Thue et Mue
- Intercommunality: CC Seulles Terre Mer

Government
  - Mayor (2020–2026): Hubert Delalande
- Area^{1}: 6.65 km^{2} (2.57 sq mi)
- Elevation: 43 m (141 ft)
- Highest elevation: 65 m (213 ft)
- Lowest elevation: 10 m (33 ft)
- Population (2023): 467
  - Density: 70.2/km^{2} (182/sq mi)
- Time zone: UTC+01:00 (CET)
  - Summer (DST): UTC+02:00 (CEST)
- INSEE/Postal code: 14062 /14440
- ^{1} French Land Register data, which excludes lakes, ponds, glaciers > 1 km^{2} (0.386 sq mi or 247 acres) and river estuaries.

Bény-sur-Mer (French pronunciation: [beni syʁ mɛʁ], literally Bény on Sea) is a commune in the Calvados department in the Normandy region, in northwestern France. It lies 5 km south of Bernières-sur-Mer and 13 km north of Caen.

== World War II ==
During World War II, Bény-sur-Mer was liberated on D-Day by Le Régiment de la Chaudière, a French Canadian unit. There was a gun battery located near the town at the time.

=== D-Day: morning ===
Although garrisoned during the Occupation, Beny-sur-Mer did not play a central role in a major tactical confrontation on D-Day. Instead, the village witnessed three noteworthy incidents on that day. To the northeast, a prolonged struggle unfolded at Château-de-Tailleville (WN 23) before Beny-sur-Mer's security was assured. Directly to its west, a brief encounter occurred at WN 28a later in the day. Additionally, early in the morning, two battalions from the 716 Infantry Division encountered a transformative shift in their day due to Naval Gunfire.

- Kompanie 8 (schwere). / Battalion II./ Grenadier-Regiment 736., commanded by Hauptmann Johann Grzeski, the Ballation reserve, was sited at Les Ruines Saint-Ursin: La Haye de Saule (at North 49.3078 Deg / West 00.4386 Deg), in a ‘Open Field Earth (Hinzu kommen Positionen in offener Feldstellung) Fa Position’. It is reported that at 0510 hrs HQ Stab Btl II. / 736 reported, to HQ 716 Inf.Div., of airborne landings south of Bernières-sur-Mer (WN 28) and north of the Chateau-de-Tailleville (WN 23) inferring enemy troopers had penetrated up into Bernières-sur-Mer. Consistent with tactical doctrine, the Kdr. Btl II./ 736., ordered Ko 8./II 736. to mount a counterattack, and destroy the threat (... ‘no one is to wait, for higher…’). Though the details of the action are not confirmed, it is suggested that Ko 8. was lost. Committed, from a well dug-in position, in its action, moving across open ground, it would have taken naval gun fire, from HMS Kempenfelt, it shelling Kompanie 3. (Flak)/Pz.Jg.-Abt.716., at la-Tomblette. ‘Nobody returned … so the details are not known.’ Kdr 716 Inf.Div.
- 3. (FlaK) Kompanie. / Panzerjäger-Abteilung 716., on Le Pommeret (la Tomblette) was sited on the low ridge overlooking the beaches from St. Aubin to Courseulles, north of Beny-sur-Mer, under the leadership of the Oberleutnant Kurt Kaergel, his Panzerjäger-Abteilung 716, Gefechtsstand: Sallenelles. The primary target of HMS Kempenfelt, its two platoons were shelled at 06h19 BST, in positions at N 49.3026Deg / W 0.4238Deg and at N 49.3015Deg / W 0.4202Deg.
  - Züg - 3. (Flak) Kp. /Pz.Jg.-Abt.716. x6 7.5 cm D.C.A. Mle 1938(f) Static AA guns, in a field emplacement.
  - Züg - 3. (Flak) Kp. /Pz.Jg.-Abt.716. x20 3.2 cm Wurfgerät 40/41, set up in Packkiste, in an open field emplacement.

Late in the Occupation, Beny-sur-Mer garrisoned a German a [Hauptkolonnen (Main) or Saunderkolonnen (Special) 160] supply transportation unit assigned from LXXXIV Armeekorps (Stab: St. Lô), to KVA H1 Caen. Located centrally to the work and units of Infantry-Division 716, a sub-unit of Kw.Trsp.Kp. 4./ Kw.Trsp.Abt. 564., it was noted to be in Beny-sur-Mer on D-Day. The supply and transport services of Occupation Static Divisions (Coastal Defense) were organized on the design that artillery batteries were not moved; as such artillery ammunition and the troop supply trains were not well resourced. From 1941, the priority for motorized and horse-drawn transport was for Divisions fighting in Russia; with almost no additional vehicles available for Divisions on occupation duty, in France. While a ‘standard’ Division Supply Column (Trains) should see up to eight motor transport columns, when mobilized in 1941, Inf.Div. 716., was allocated no supply commander, and only one motor transport column.

- Kraftwagen-Transport-Abteilung 564 (Motor Vehicle Transport Battalion: Kw.Trsp.Abt.564.) was established (Aufstellung) in June 1941 in Wehrkreis IV: Dresden, and assigned to Heerestruppe bei der Heeresgruppe B im Westen (H.Gr.B - La Roche Guyon). In December 1941, it added Kompanien 3. (FN 44363 aus WK IX: Kassel) and Kompanien 4. (FN 45651 aus WK VI: Münster) and in May 1943, designated ‘z. b. V.’ (zur besonderer Verwendung: for special purposes / for special use). With an OB West February 1944 reorganization: Kraftwagen-Transport-Regiment z.b.V. West., (Standarten) was established (in France) regrouping its three Kw.Trsp.Abt, fielding 13 Companies. The new Kw.Trsp.Rgt. West was designated Heeresgruppen-Truppen beim OB West (Paris: St Germain-en-Laye), commanded by General des Transportwesens West. Consequently, Kw.Trsp.Abt. 564 z.b.V. (Versorgungstruppen Nu. 21108010) was assigned (directly) as (Unterstellung): Kw.Trsp.Abt 564 (Stab Paris: Rueil-Malmaison) to 7. Armee (Stab: Le Mans) in der Kompanie NSKK (Nationalsozialistisches Kraftfahrkorps) Transportabteilung zur Wehrmacht.
  - AOK 7 allocated Kraftwagen Transport Kompanie 4., to LXXXIV Armeekorps (Stab: St. Lô) for employment with NSKK Transportkorps Speer, supporting allocated Divisions in defence and construction of Coastal fortifications. Feldpostnummern FN 45651 was first used in July 1941, assigned to 4.Kompanie Kraftwagen-Transport-Abteilung z.b.V. 564 (zur besonderer Verwendung). It changed designation in March 1942 to 4. Kompanie Kraftwagen-Transport-Abteilung 564. With a further reorganization, in October 1943, it was deleted, as a standalone unit in the Field Postal Directory (with the eventual forming of Kraftwagen-Transport-Regiment West).

=== D-Day: around noon ===
Widerstandnesten WN 23 was located at North 49.308275 Degrees / West 00.409888 Degrees and in June 1944, for targeting purposes, at: LZ1 vT MR Grid 003823 (Ref. GSGS 4250 1:50K: Creully Sheet 7E/5). The (WN) - Resistance Nest at the Château-de-Tailleville (de la colonie) was a unique ‘platoon-sized’ position, incorporating standard concrete (Verstärkt Feltmessig: Vf Type 2) gun casemates, with well-sited observation and crewed fighting positions. Located to dominate the roads entering the town, the position did dispose of an integrated network of trenches and tunnels, partially surrounded by a stone wall, permitting unobserved movement under cover.

Hauptmann Deptolla, Kommandeur Bataillon II./ 736., defending with only his Stabs-züg (Lt Heinz Rix, Karl Rub), and the Stabs-kompanie, perhaps undermanned, would cause problems all day for the Canadians. Planning to fight with his west flank secured by Kompanie 8.(schwere)/ II 736., at Les Ruines Saint-Ursin, off to the west, his right flank by Kompanie 12.(schwere)/ Bataillon III./736., to the east, in front of Douvres (WN 23a), and drawing ‘artillery’ support from Kompanie 3.(Flak)/Pz.Jg.-Abt.716., to his immediate west, he found himself alone. Having been located and well targeted, in 3rd Canadian Infantry Division planning, the fight for WN 23 was first impacted by Naval Counter Battery Gun Fire from the destroyer HMS Kempenfelt (R03) (at 06h19m), she shelling Kompanie 3 (Flak)./Pz.Jg.-Abt.716., sited in an open field emplacement, at Tailleville-la-Tomblette. This followed later in the morning by RAF Medium (Day) Bombers at 07h55 (BST).

WN 23 was overcome by the efforts of 'C' Company, The North Shore (New Brunswick) Regiment (O.C. Major Daughney), landing at Saint Aubin-sur-Mer at 09h45. When able to bypass the fight for WN 27, intending to make a quick run to Tailleville, ‘C’ Company, The North Shore Regiment, was attached a tank troop from 'C' Squadron, The Fort Garry Horse. First reporting contact around noon, moving South, at MR Grid 004823, enemy mortars slowed the advance, the ‘C’ Sqn tanks moved-up, giving the necessary fire and moral support to get the North Shores up to the Chateau. Getting into the position at 13h52, a Sherman tank penetrated the walls, fronting the Chateau grounds, and shot up the trenches and their defenders with high explosive shells, at point blank range. After six hours of fighting, the remnants of the garrison surrendering, ‘C’ Company ‘secured’ Tailleville, at 17h30. 'D' Company was moved up to Tailleville on the east flank, as 'A' Company had previously sealed off the southern side of the position.

Having consolidated on the position, ‘C’ Company captured 4 Officers and 57 other prisoners, this reported at 20h10. It continued to root in the underground workings of the Château; around 23h00 producing more prisoners, including two wounded monocled officers. At 23h30 all of 'C' Squadron, The Fort Garry Horse, moved into position with the North Shores, the squadron laagered and passed an uncomfortable night constantly on the alert in expectation of a German counterattack. The North Shore (New Brunswick) Regiment lost 34 killed and 90 wounded in the fight for WN 23.

German Crew Served Weapons at Châteaux de Tailleville.

Regelbau Type	Ringstand (Casement)	Weapon / Gun	Details
OB Gr.West Vf600	Kampfwagenkanone: Open Pedestal	50mm KwK 39 L/60	At Northwest Corner
Heer Vf Rs58c - 80 cm Thick	Open Tobrouk x2	Heavy MG - MG34 Crewed	At North and East Corners
OB Gr.W Type 34 VfRs69	Tobrouk s.Granatwerfer	8.14 cm Heavy Mortar	Gruppen Crew and Observer
Weapon Crew Posts (Open)	Reinforced Vf (Verstärkt Feldmäßig)	Light MGs - Maschinengewehr	Steel Ring MG Mounts

=== D-Day: at dusk ===
Le Regiment de la Chaudiere (8 CIB Reserve), at Bernières-sur-Mer, by 10h30, forming up with 'A' Squadron, The Fort Garry Horse moved South towards Beny-sur-Mer, encountering significant resistance, in exiting the town. While its Company ‘A’ (OC Major H. Lapointe), dealt with two very capable 8.8 cm Pak 43/41, in an open field emplacement, of Kompanie 2.(StuG) /Pz.Jg-Abt 716., sited just southwest of Berniers (on Les Perrucques), its ‘B' Company remained focused on its run to Beny-sur-Mer and WN28a. Having moved up with little difficulty, Company ‘B' Le Regiment de la Chaudiere (OC J.F. L’Esperance), ‘captured’ WN 28a by mid-afternoon, taking 54 prisoners. At the end of the day, The Fort Garry Horse were ordered back for rest and vehicle replenishment in Beny-sur-Mer, it was not until 01h00 07.06 that 'B' squadron made it back, while ‘C’ Squadron remained in Tailleville. The Fort Garry Horse suffered 13 killed and 12 wounded casualties on D-Day.

Widerstandnesten WN 28a was located West of Beny-sur-Mer (Moulineaux), at North 49.293 Degrees / West 00.451 Degrees and in June 1944, for targeting purposes, at: French Lambert MR Grid LZ1 vT 972808 (Ref. GSGS 4250 1:50K: Creully Sheet 7E/5). The (WN) - Resistance Nest, its south approach protected by La Mue, was a doctrinally laid-out four gun German ‘batterie-sized’ tactical position, with perimeter crewed weapon fighting positions, and ammunition storage points. The four 100mm le.F.H14/19(t) Czech guns, with an effective range of 9,970m range, were disposed in Type 1 ‘Open’ Field Gun Earth Fa Emplacements (Geschutzestellungen), incorporating only one Type Heer 669 ‘Gun’ (Verstärkt Feltmessig: Vf Type 2) concrete casement. Located to support the landing defences at Courseulles-sur-Mer, Berniers-sur-Mer, and St Aubin-sur-Mer, the position did dispose of light crew-served weapons, in supporting trenches on its South flank.

While effectively manned by Batterie 7. (Resi). / Bataillon II. / 1716 AR, commanded by Hauptmann Wilhelm Franke, his contribution to the fights on the JUNO beaches did not go as planned. Its intended effect, on the five Mike and Nan beaches was effectively neutralized by Naval Counter Battery Gun Fire, specifically from the cruiser HMS Diadem (84) at 05h52, and then furthered bombed by RAF Medium / Fighter Bombers at 08h15. There was not much fight left when, approaching from the northeast, it was overcome Le Regiment de la Chaudiere.

In Beny-sur-Mer there remains two reminders of D-Day and June 1944.

- Bény-sur-Mer Canadian War Cemetery commemorates Canadian losses suffered on D-Day 1944 and subsequent battles in France. The cost in lives had been high, though not as high as had been estimated, on D-Day Canada suffered almost a thousand casualties, of whom 340 were killed or died of wounds.
- Beny-sur-Mer Airfield at 49°17'54"N / 00°25'34"W was a former Allied temporary invasion airfield, located 1 km north-northeast of Beny-sur-Mer in the Lower Normandy. The Airfield (ALG B4) was completed on 15 June 1944, it consisted of a 4,000' runway aligned 08Deg/35Deg, with dispersal areas, communications facilities, and landing lights, and was in continuous use until early August 1944.

== Population ==
Historical population
Year	Pop.	±% p.a.
1968	288	—
1975	272	−0.81%
1982	270	−0.11%
1990	278	+0.37%
1999	316	+1.43%
2007	331	+0.58%
2012	402	+3.96%
2017	445	+2.05%
2023	467	+0.81%
Source: INSEE

== See also ==
- Communes of the Calvados department
