= No. 17 Sector RAF =

No. 17 Sector RAF 17th Wing RFC No. 17 (Malta) Wing RAF No. 17 (Fighter) Wing RAF
- Active: 1916-18; 1918-19; 1943-44; 1944
- Country: United Kingdom
- Branch: Royal Flying Corps; Royal Air Force
- Type: Sector; Previously Wing

No. 17 Sector RAF is a former Royal Air Force Sector that was operational during both the First and the Second World Wars.

== First World War ==
17th Wing RFC was formed on 9 August 1916 at Gosport controlling Gosport and Beaulieu units. On 19 August 1916, ARS formed at Gosport, the wing was transferred to Southern Group Command on 10 January 1917. The wing moved to Beaulieu on 2 August 1917 and moved to No. 8 Group RAF on the day the Royal Air Force was born on 1 April 1918. It was transferred to No. 7 Group RAF on 13 May 1918 and disbanded on 12 August 1918.

The wing was reformed on 28 September 1918 as the No. 17 (Malta) Wing RAF at Malta to control local units such as:

- No. 267 Squadron RAF
- No. 268 Squadron RAF
- No. 562 Flight RAF

It was disbanded on 14 May 1919.

== Second World War ==
No. 17 (Fighter) Wing RAF was formed on 4 July 1943 at RAF Headcorn controlling:

- No. 126 Airfield Headquarters RAF
- No. 127 Airfield Headquarters RAF
- No. 144 Airfield Headquarters RAF (from 20 April 1944)

Shortly afterwards on 14 October 1943 the wing moved to RAF Kenley. The wing was disbanded on 15 May 1944.

No. 17 (Fighter) Sector was formed on 12 May 1944 at RAF Kenley controlling:

- No. 122 Wing RAF
- No. 126 Wing RAF
- No. 127 Wing RAF

The sector moved to RAF Old Sarum on 6 June 1944, before moving to B.2 Crepon where the sector disbanded on 12 July 1944.

== See also ==
- List of wings of the Royal Air Force
