= 401 Tactical Fighter Squadron =

No. 401 Squadron RCAF
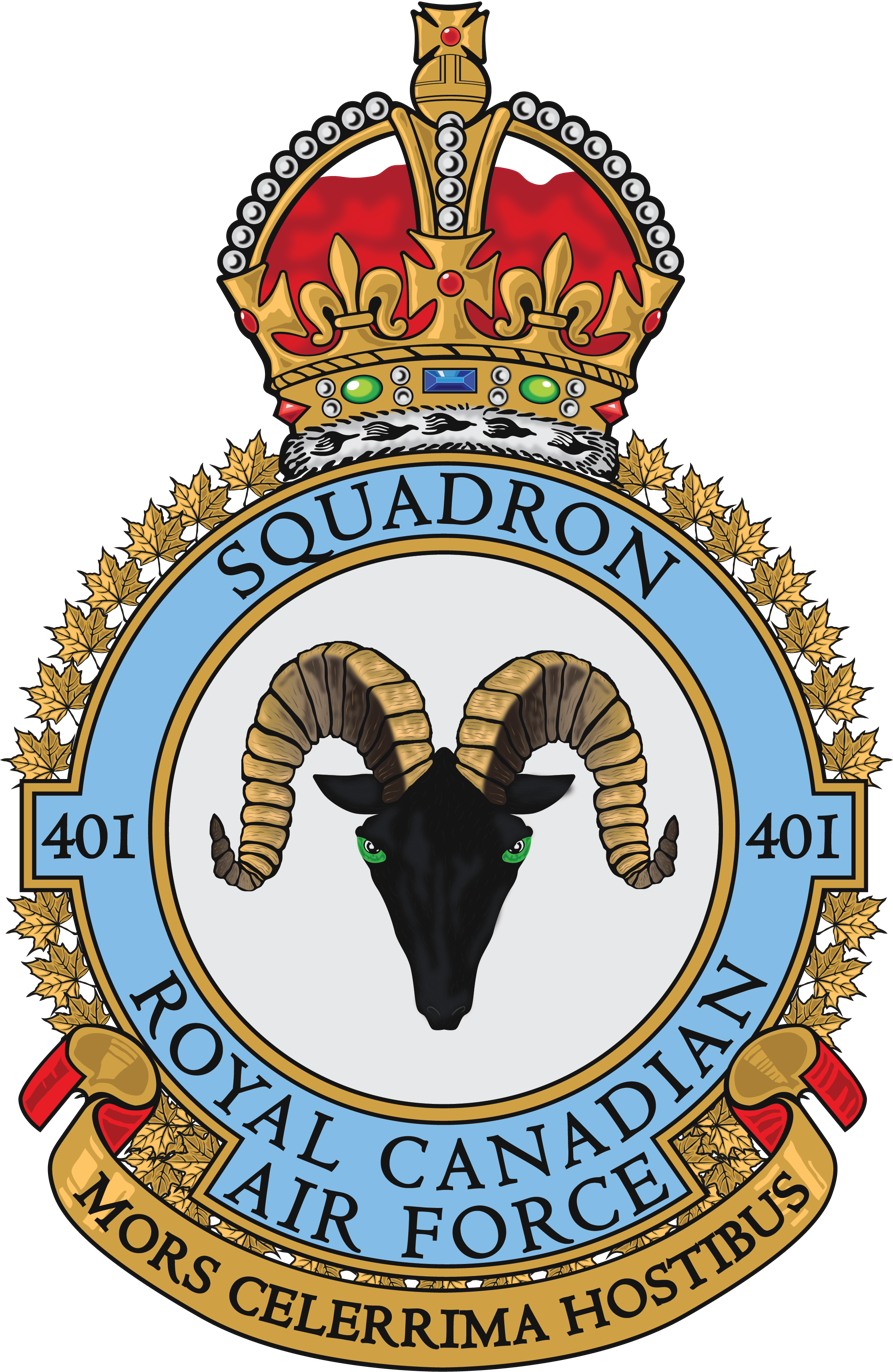
- Second World War variant of the squadron badge
- Active: 21 September 1937 – 1 March 1941 (as No. 1); 1 March 1941 – 10 July 1945; 15 April 1946 – 23 June 1996; 30 June 2015 – present
- Country: Canada
- Branch: Royal Canadian Air Force
- Role: Fighter, Helicopter and Training
- Nicknames: City of Westmount, Ram
- Motto: Mors celerrima hostibus (Latin for 'Very swift death for the enemy')
- Battle honours: Battle of Britain, 1940; Defence of Britain, 1940–1944; English Channel and North Sea, 1942; Fortress Europe, 1941–1944; Dieppe; France and Germany, 1944–1945; Normandy, 1944; Arnhem; Rhine
- Website: canada.ca/en/air-force/corporate/squadrons/401-squadron.html

Commanders
- Current commander: Lieutenant-Colonel Tristan McKee
- Squadron CWO: Chief Warrant Officer Jason Holloway

Insignia
- Squadron Badge heraldry: A Rocky Mountain sheep's head, caboshed
- Squadron Codes: YO (July/August 1940 – May 1945)

No. 401 Tactical Fighter Squadron, a.k.a. "City of Westmount" Squadron (originally No. 1 Squadron), is a Royal Canadian Air Force squadron based at CFB Cold Lake. During World War II it was a fighter squadron and is notable for having fought in the Battle of Britain. Postwar, the squadron operated in Canada as an auxiliary squadron, reserve squadron and a helicopter and training squadron. In 2015 it was reactivated as a tactical fighter squadron, flying the McDonnell Douglas CF-18 Hornet.

== History ==
=== Formation ===
No. 1 Squadron Royal Canadian Air Force was formed as a fighter unit at Trenton, Ontario, on 21 September 1937 with Siskin aircraft. The squadron was formed from the Fighter Flight of No. 3 (Bomber) Squadron. In August 1938, the squadron moved to Calgary, Alberta, and was re-equipped with Hawker Hurricane aircraft in February 1939. While stationed in Calgary, the squadron was commanded by Squadron Leader Elmer Garfield Fullerton. It was mobilized at Saint-Hubert, Quebec, on 10 September 1939, and on 5 November 1939 it moved to Dartmouth, Nova Scotia.

The unit began as a permanent peacetime unit which, augmented by personnel from RCAF No. 115 Squadron (Auxiliary), arrived at its first base in the UK, Middle Wallop, on 21 June 1940. It had brought its own Hurricanes from Canada, and as these were not fully up to UK standard, the squadron was non-operational until mid-August when it moved to RAF Northolt. At the time the squadron comprised 27 officers (21 pilots) and 314 airmen. To gain experience of Fighter Command operations, Squadron Leader E.A. McNab, Commanding Officer, flew on operations attached to No. 111 Squadron, and claimed a He 111 bomber destroyed on 11 August 1940.

=== Fighter Command 1940 ===
The squadron was posted to RAF Middle Wallop in June 1940, before in July moving to RAF Croydon.

The squadron's début was inauspicious when two Bristol Blenheims of RAF Coastal Command were accidentally shot down on 24 August, and three crewmen killed.

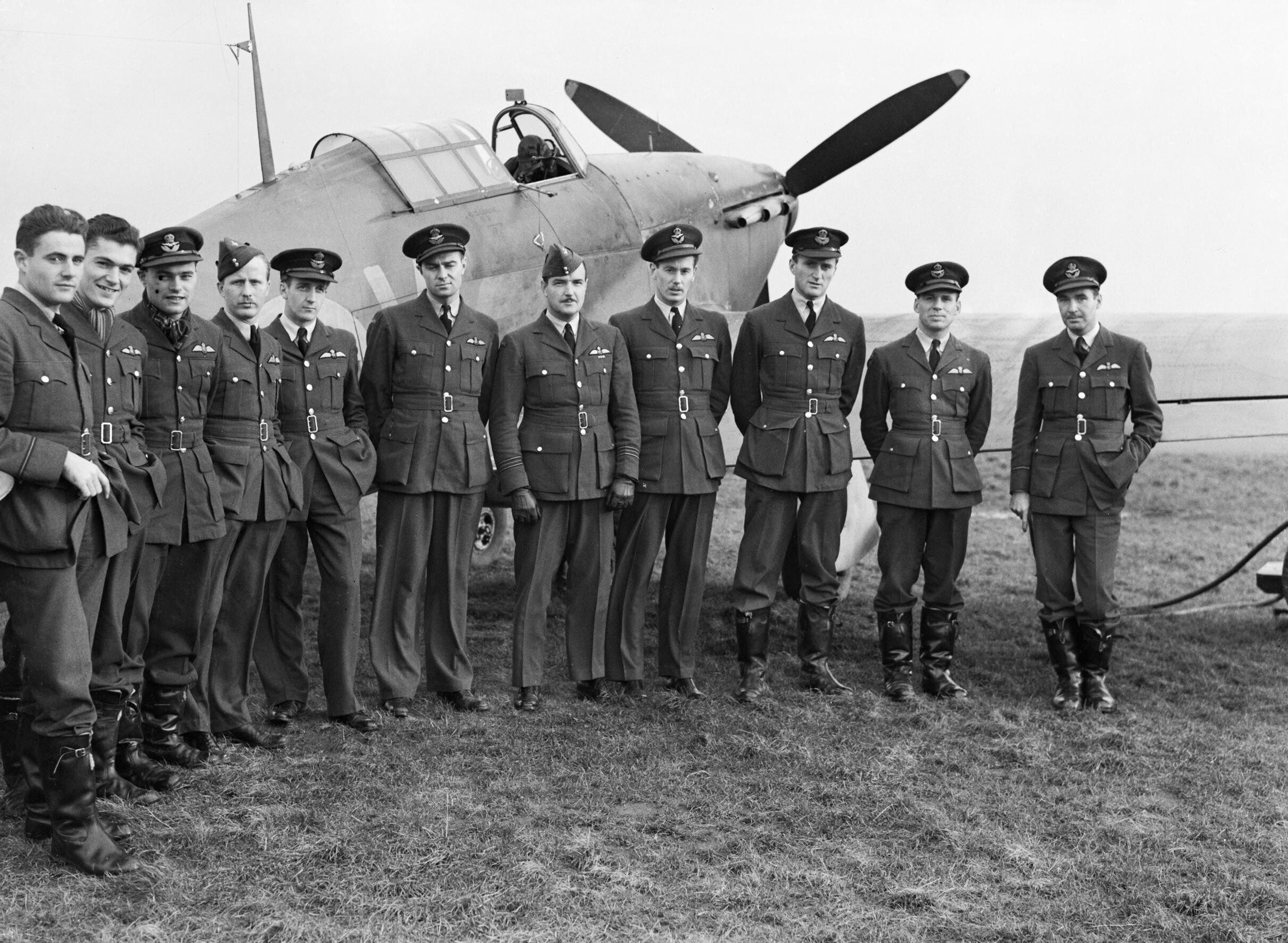
Pilots of No. 1 Squadron at Prestwick, Scotland, 30 October 1940

On its second patrol on 26 August 1940 it met with 25–30 Dornier Do 215s and was credited with three destroyed and three damaged in the fight. However, three of the squadron's aircraft were shot down and one pilot (Flying Officer R. L. Edwards) was killed. The squadron experienced a fairly high aircraft loss rate during the end of August and into September as the squadron battled against the German formations over south London.

On 21 September the squadron participated in the first attempt at a wing formation operation by the Northholt-based squadrons, with No. 229 Squadron RAF and No. 303 (Polish), although no enemy aircraft were encountered. By 27 September, although downing seven bombers, only six aircraft were operational by the end of the day.

On 11 October the depleted squadron was moved to RAF Prestwick in Scotland and its operational activity was coastal patrol work over the Clyde approaches.

During the 53 days it participated in the battle the squadron claimed 30 enemy aircraft destroyed, probably destroyed eight, and damaged 35. It flew 1,694 sorties (1,569 operational hours and 1,201 non-operational), lost three pilots killed, thirteen wounded, 17 aircraft FB/Cat. 3 and 10 Cat. 2. The most successful pilots were Flight Lieutenant Gordon McGregor (five kills), Squadron Leader E. A. McNab (four and one shared), Flying Officer B. D. 'Dal' Russel (four and one shared), Flying Officer J.W. Kerwin (three) and Flying Officer A.D. Nesbit (three).

Three Distinguished Flying Crosses were awarded.

The squadron was withdrawn to Scotland during October 1940.

On 2 November McGregor took over as commanding officer from McNab.

=== Smither brothers ===
Ross and Sydney Smither, of London, Ontario, were both pilots with No. 1 (401) Squadron. Ross, born in 1912, joined the RCAF in 1930 as a fitter, later training as an air gunner before applying for a pilots course, being commissioned and joining No. 1 squadron, which was the first to be posted to the UK, arriving in June 1940. Flying a Hurricane, he was shot down and killed on 15 September 1940.

His brother, Sydney, born in 1921, joined the RCAF and was commissioned into the same squadron, by then No. 401, and posted to the UK. Based at Biggin Hill, flying Spitfires, the squadron was on escort duties to a bomber raid over France on 5 June 1942 when he was shot down and killed. It was his 21st birthday. A further coincidence is that Ross, operating from Northolt, was shot down defending Biggin Hill on Battle of Britain day, the airfield that was Sydney's base when he, also, was shot down.

=== 1941 ===
The squadron moved south again in February 1941 when it arrived at RAF Digby. It was here on 1 March that No 1 Squadron RCAF was renumbered to No. 401 Squadron.

The squadron had replaced its Hurricanes with Spitfires Mk IIs in September 1941, Mk Vs in late 1941 and in July 1942 some of the first examples of the new Mk IX. Operating from Digby with No 12 Group Fighter Command until October 1941, it saw little action, but it then moved south to RAF Biggin Hill and remained in 11 Group carrying out offensive operations over Occupied Europe until January 1943.

On 21 October 401's first loss of this phase of operations was Flight Sergeant B.F. Whitson, taken prisoner after being shot down over Saint-Omer. On 27 October the squadron was operating as high cover to the Biggin Hill Wing, and were 'bounced' by I and III Gruppe, JG 26, led by Oberst Adolf Galland. Five Spitfires were lost, with Flying Officer C. A. B. Wallace, Pilot Officer J.A. Small and Sergeant S. L. Thompson killed, and Pilot Officer Wally Floody and Sergeant B. G. Hodgkinson both prisoner. On 8 November 1941 on the last mass fighter sweep of the year the squadron was attacked by I. and III./JG 26, and Flying Officer J. C. Weir (prisoner of war) and Sergeant R. W. Gardner (killed) were lost over Le Touquet shot down by Fw. Babenz and Leut. Uibacker of JG 26. A two-squadron sweep with No. 72 Squadron over France on 22 November saw claims for two Bf 109s and three Fw 190s destroyed (I./JG 26 lost one Bf 109 and a Fw 190 crash-landed) for Flying Officer H.A. Sprague (POW).

=== 1942–44 ===
On 12 February 1942 following the 'Channel Dash' of the Scharnhorst and Gneisenau in Operation Donnerkeil, six Swordfish of No. 825 FAA Squadron were to meet with an escort from 64 and 411 Squadrons (Hornchurch) and 72, 124 and 401 Squadrons (Biggin Hill) over Manston at mid-day. The escort missed the rendezvous, however, although 401 later claimed two Bf 109s destroyed, for the loss of Sergeant Levesque, who was taken prisoner.

The Fw 190 fighter force continued to take toll of the Fighter Command squadrons, 401 being no exception. On 28 April Pilot Officer J. A. Ferguson: (POW) and Pilot Officer G. B. Whitney (killed) were lost although Pilot Officer Don Blakeslee, an RCAF-enlisted American, claimed two 'probables'. On 1 May the squadron lost two more Spitfires to JG 2 over Le Havre while, on 1 June 1942, when a section of 401 intercepted and shot down two Hawker Typhoon fighters of No. 56 Squadron, one pilot was killed. In June the squadron received some of the first Mark IX Spitfires, capable of taking on the Focke Wulf Fw 190A on more or less equal terms. On 19 August during Operation Jubilee two probables and three damaged were claimed. On 8 November Flight Lieutenant Don Morrison was shot down and badly wounded versus units of JG 26, losing a leg and being repatriated in 1943. Morrison's tally of 5.33 aircraft destroyed, four 'probables' and four damaged was 401's highest since the Battle of Britain.

Moving to RAF Catterick in early 1943, the squadron was involved in training and coastal patrols for four months before returning to 11 Group in late May, where the squadron reverted to Spitfire Mk IX's and became part of No. 126 Wing, No 83 Group, 2nd Tactical Air Force (2TAF). The unit resumed operational flying from RAF Redhill in June, and RAF Staplehurst in August and Biggin Hill on October.

Operations prior to D-Day were flown from RAF Tangmere. On 15 March four JG 26 Fw 190s were claimed (three were actually lost).

=== D-day and European Offensive 1944 ===
On 7 June eight aircraft were claimed destroyed, and on 18 June the squadron moved to the B-4 airstrip at Beny-sur-Mer, France. Six more fighters were claimed downed on 28 June. No. 401 shot down three fighters of JG 26 on 7 July. The squadron's 100th victory was notched up on 20 July, while seven more Bf 109s were shot down on 27 July over Caen.

The squadron increasingly operated in the fighter-bomber role, ground attack and armed reconnaissance operations, culminating in operations supporting operations over Nijmegen and the ground fighting in Arnhem in September. Squadron Leader R. I. A. 'Rod' Smith, an experienced Malta 'ace', was posted from 412 Squadron and took command in September. On 29 September the squadron surprised some thirty Bf 109s attacking a Typhoon formation, and claimed at least nine destroyed for one loss.

On 5 October, a five-strong squadron patrol encountered a Messerschmitt Me 262 jet of KG 51 and shot it down, the pilot, Hpt. Hans-Christoph Buttmann, was killed. This was the first victory over this type credited to either the RAF or RCAF.

During late 1944 the unit operated from 'B-80' airfield in Volkel and then 'B-88', near Heesch, in the Netherlands.

In the course of Operation Bodenplatte, the mass ground-attack of 1 January 1945 by the Luftwaffe, the unit claimed nine of the attackers shot down, making the tally since D-Day 76.5 aircraft destroyed, three probables and 37 damaged. The next day Squadron Leader William Klersy was appointed Commanding Officer. The squadron caught Fw 190s taking off from Twente airfield on 14 January and five fighters of I./JG 1 shot down for one loss, Flight Lieutenant L. J. Mackay claiming three. On 23 January 401 claimed three Arado Ar 234 jet-bombers of III./KG 76 over Achmer airfield.

Operations were restricted in the early part of 1945 due to bad weather, but from the end of February it was heavily involved in the offensive until the end of the war. The squadron received a few Spitfire XIVs in May 1945, but Mk XVIs became standard equipment until the squadron disbanded at Faßberg in Germany on 3 July 1945. 20 April saw No. 401 claim some eight Bf 109s spotted taking off from a grass airstrip near Schwerin, and another five claimed later in the day over Hagenau aerodrome. On 3 May 401 attacked aircraft on the ground North West of Kiel, claiming 12 Ju 52s, two He 111s and a Ju 87 destroyed; the Squadron's last claims of the war.

=== End of the war and disbandment ===
The squadron ended the war as 2TAF's top scoring unit, claiming 112 aerial victories between 6 June 1944 and 5 May 1945. Their total score for the war was 186.5 confirmed, 29 of which were claimed during 1940 when operating as No.1 RCAF Squadron.

=== Postwar ===
The squadron was reactivated as an auxiliary fighter unit on 15 April 1946 at RCAF Station St. Hubert and in 1969 became 401 Air Reserve Squadron based in Montreal. In 1991, the squadron was renamed 401 Helicopter Operational Training Squadron.

No. 401 Squadron was disbanded on 23 June 1996.

The commander of 1 Canadian Air Division, Major-General Dave Wheeler, along with the commander of 4 Wing Cold Lake, Alberta, Colonel Eric Kenny, participated in a ceremony to reactivate 401 Tactical Fighter Squadron on 30 June 2015. Its first deployment was to Kuwait for offensive operations during Operation Impact.

The squadron flies the CF-18 Hornet, Canada's primary and front-line jet fighter aircraft.

On 20 November 2018, 401 celebrated its 100th anniversary.

== Stations ==
No 401 Squadron was based at the following RAF Stations and locations:

| Station | From | To |
|---|---|---|
| RAF Middle Wallop | 21 June 1940 | July 1940 |
| RAF Croydon | July 1940 | Mid-August 1940 |
| RAF Northolt | Mid-August 1940 | 10 October 1940 |
| RAF Prestwick | 11 October 1940 | February 1941 |
| RAF Digby | February 1941 | October 1941 |
| RAF Biggin Hill | October 1941 | January 1943 |
| RAF Catterick | January 1943 | May 1943 |
| RAF Redhill | May 1943 | August 1943 |
| RAF Staplehurst | August 1943 | October 1943 |
| RAF Biggin Hill | October 1943 | April 1944 |
| RAF Tangmere | April 1944 | 18 June 1944 |
| France | 18 June 1944 | |
| Belgium/Netherlands | August 1944 | |
| Faßberg | | 3 July 1945 (disbanded) |
| RCAF Station St. Hubert | 15 April 1946 | 23 June 1996 |
| 4 Wing Cold Lake | 30 June 2015 | Present |
