= No. 411 Squadron RCAF =

No. 411 (Grizzly Bear) Squadron RCAF
- Active: 1941-1946, 1950-1996
- Country: Canada
- Branch: Royal Canadian Air Force
- Base: RAF Digby 1941-1946; CFB Downsview 1950-1996
- Nickname(s): Grizzly Bear
- Motto(s): Inimicus Inimico
- Equipment: Supermarine Spitfire, Havard and DHC-1 Chipmunk, de Havilland Vampire, Canadair Sabre, Beechcraft Model 18, DHC-3 Otter, CH-136 Kiowa
- Battle honours: Defence of Britain 1941-44, English Channel and North Sea 1942-43, Fortress Europe 1941-44, Dieppe, France and Germany 1944-45, Arnhem, Normandy 1944, Rhine

No. 411 "City of York" Squadron RCAF was a Second World War Royal Canadian Air Force squadron that operated as part of RAF Fighter Command in Europe with the Supermarine Spitfire.

== History ==
The squadron was formed on 16 June 1941 at RAF Digby in Lincolnshire, England as an Article XV squadron under the control of the British Royal Air Force. The squadron was equipped with the Supermarine Spitfire and after a period of training the squadron began operations in August 1941 with the Spitfire VB variant. Part of the Hornchurch Wing it operated over continental Europe on Rhubarb sorties and as bomber escorts. After some rest periods the squadron joined the Kenley Wing for more operations over Europe.

Converting to the Spitfire IX in October 1943 it then became a fighter-bomber squadron. Within two weeks of the D-Day it was operating from France in the close-support role and it also operated armed reconnaissance flights. Following the advancing troops the squadron was soon based in Germany until it was disbanded at Utersen on 21 March 1946.

411 Squadron was reformed as an auxiliary fighter squadron at RCAF Station Downsview Ont. just outside Toronto on 1 October 1950. It was known as the 'County of York' squadron, the county in which Toronto was at the time located. With Havards and Chipmunks as trainers the squadron operated the de Havilland Vampire until 1956, then transitioned to the Canadair Sabre Mark V, made by Canadair in Montreal in the 1950s.

In the fall of 1958, 411 was moved from Air Defence Command to Air Transport Command, and became a light transport squadron flying the Expediter C-45, a version of the Beechcraft Model 18. The squadron adopted a Search and Rescue role in spring of 1960 with the acquisition of the DHC-3 Otter. These aircraft were operated with the RCAF code 'CSR-123', standing for Canadian Search and Rescue Model 123. The C-45 Expediter was retired in 1966.

In 1969, 411 Squadron was transferred from Air Transport Command to 10 Tactical Air Group, and the squadron's primary role changed to the support of army operations. It continued to hold a secondary SAR role, and to do mapping surveys and sovereignty flights in the Canadian arctic. In 1981, the Otter was retired and the squadron transitioned to the CH-136 Kiowa (OH-58) helicopter, which it operated in a reconnaissance and tactical support role. The squadron disbanded in 1996 following the closure of RCAF Station Downsview.

== Aircraft operated ==
| Dates | Aircraft | Variant | Notes |
|---|---|---|---|
| 1941 | Supermarine Spitfire | I and IIA | Single-engined fighter |
| 1941-1943 | Supermarine Spitfire | VB | |
| 1943-1944 | Supermarine Spitfire | IX | |
| 1945 | Supermarine Spitfire | XVI | |
| 1945-1946 | Supermarine Spitfire | XIV | |

== Notes ==
=== References ===
- The Illustrated Encyclopedia of Aircraft (Part Work 1982-1985). Orbis Publishing. 1985.
- Jefford, C.G. (1988). RAF Squadrons. Airlife Publishing Ltd. ISBN 1-85310-053-6.
