= 412 Transport Squadron =

Coordinates: 45°19′21″N 075°40′09″W

- Active: 1941–present
- Country: Canada
- Branch: (Canada) Royal Canadian Air Force
- Role: VIP transport and general duties
- Home station: Ottawa, Ontario
- Mottos: Promptus Ad Vindictam ("Swift to avenge")
- Battle honours: Defence of Britain 1941–44; English Channel and North Sea 1942–43; Fortress Europe 1941–44; Dieppe; France and Germany 1944–45; Normandy 1944; Arnhem; Rhine

Insignia
- Squadron Badge: A falcon volant

Aircraft flown
- Transport: CC-144 Challenger

No. 412 Transport Squadron is one of three Royal Canadian Air Force (RCAF) transport squadrons attached to Ottawa, Ontario. The squadron operates with a strength of about 29 out of the Pilot Officer John Gillespie Magee, Jr. Annex. The Annex officially opened on January 11, 1995.

No. 412 Squadron began as a unit of the RCAF during the Second World War.

== History ==
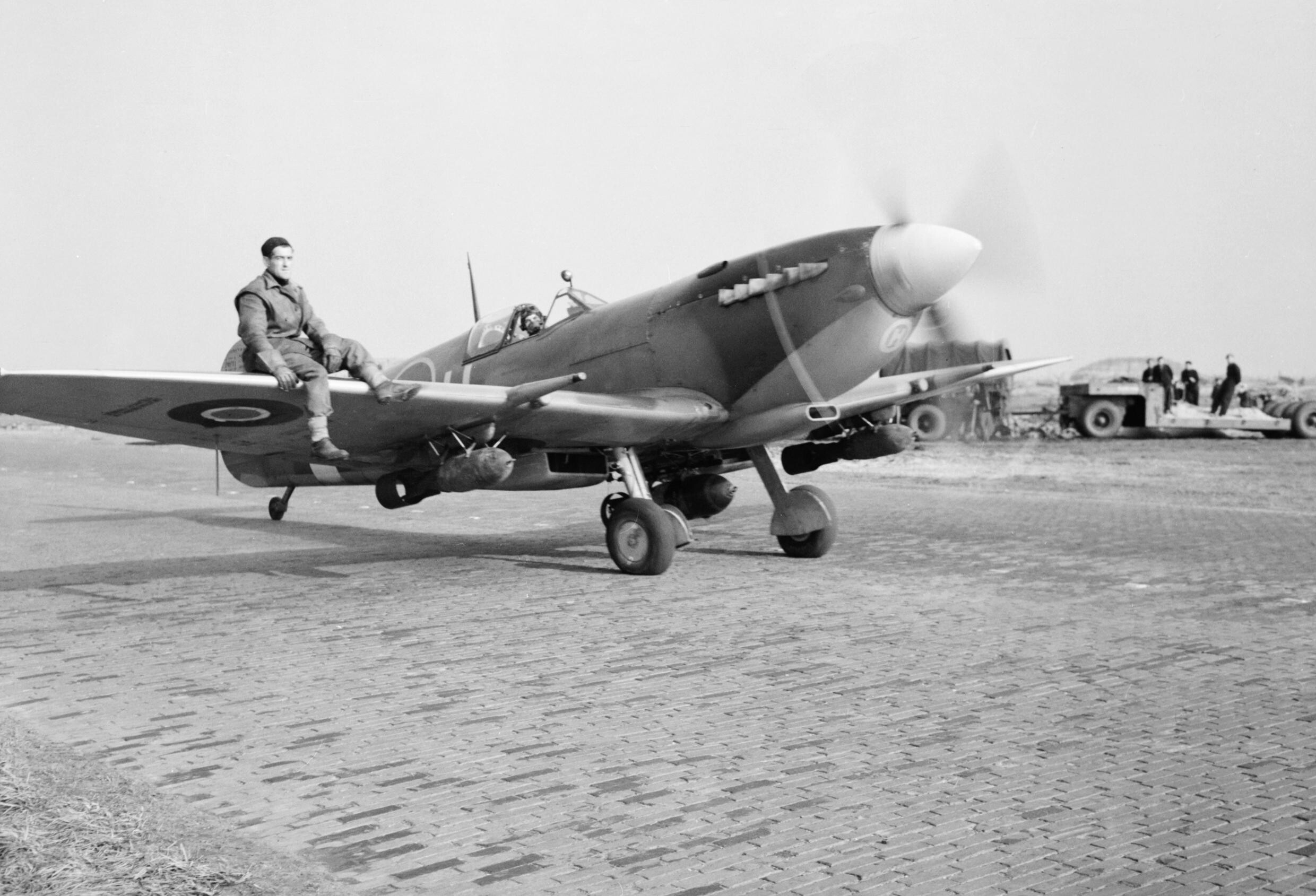
A Spitfire Mark IXE of No. 412 Squadron taxies out for a sortie at RAF Volkel now (Volkel Air Base) in October 1944

=== Second World War ===
No. 412 (Transport) Squadron was formed in 1949, but traces its history back to two separate squadrons: Number 12 Communications Flight at RCAF Station Ottawa and 412 (Fighter) Squadron, which was formed at RAF Digby, England on 30 June 1941.

John Gillespie Magee, the author of the famous aviation poem, High Flight, was serving with 412 Squadron when he was killed in a mid-air collision in his Spitfire in 1941.

No. 412 Squadron (squadron code 'VZ') was equipped with the Supermarine Spitfire Vb and served at a number of RAF Stations in the United Kingdom In October 1943, the squadron joined RCAF 126 Wing, part of the RAF Second Tactical Air Force. It was re-equipped with the Supermarine Spitfire IXb in November and began operating over northern France in preparation for Operation Overlord, the D-Day landings. It was during late 1943 that the ace George "Screwball" Beurling scored his last air victory while serving with the squadron. On July 17, 1944, 412 Squadron pilot Charley Fox seriously injured Field Marshal Erwin Rommel during a strafing run.

The squadron was moved to France in June 1944, days after the Allied landings and operated on continental Europe for the remainder of the war. The squadron was based at Wunstorf, Germany when the war ended in May 1945, disbanding on 15 March 1946 while at B 174 Utersen, Schleswig-Holstein, Germany.

=== Postwar ===
After the Second World War, Number 12 Communications Flight was reassigned as 412 Squadron on 1 April 1947, and renamed 412 (Composite) Squadron based at Rockcliffe. In 1955, the 412 moved to Uplands. In the late 1970s a sub-unit was established at CFB Lahr in West Germany. This operation closed in 1993.

In 1994, CFB Ottawa (Uplands) closed and 412's fleet was moved to a civilian hangar at Ottawa International Airport. All aircraft are maintained by Transport Canada on behalf of the Canadian Forces.

== Current role ==
Today, 412 (Transport) Squadron provides executive transport for the Office of the Governor General, members of Parliament, high-level government officials, members of the Canadian Armed Forces, and foreign VIPs while they are in Canada. 412 (T) Sqn also provides aeromedical evacuation and transport.

== Aircraft operated ==
Aircraft previously used by 412:

- Supermarine Spitfire IIA, VB, IXB, IXE, XVIE & XIV
- North American Harvard
- Beechcraft Expeditor
- Douglas Dakota
- 1 Canadair North Star 1949–1966
- 2 de Havilland Comet 1A 1953–1963
- 2 Canadair CC-106 Yukon 1961–1978 - VIP configuration
- 1 de Havilland Canada CC-132 (Dash 7) - based at Lahr 1980–1987
- 2 de Havilland Canada CC-142 (Dash 8) - based at Lahr 1987–93
- 1 Canadair CC-109 Cosmopolitan 1960–1980
- 7 Dassault CC-117 (Falcon) 1968–1985

Aircraft currently used by 412:

- 4 Canadair CC-144 Challenger business jets.

== See also ==
- Royal Canadian Air Force VIP aircraft
- Bombardier Challenger 600
- Air transports of heads of state and government - Canada
