= Roger Topp =

British Royal Airforce officer

Roger Leslie Topp
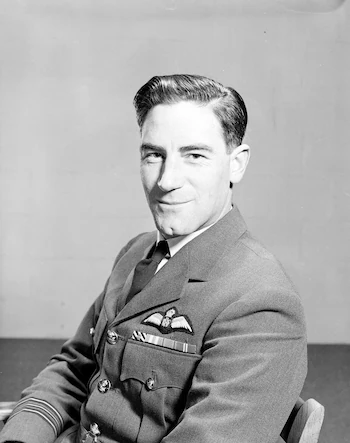
- Born: 14 May 1923; Chichester, West Sussex, England
- Died: 6 March 2020 (aged 96); Norwich, Norfolk, England
- Relatives: Audrey Jeffery (m. 1945–1999, her death)
- Military career
- Allegiance: United Kingdom
- Branch: Royal Air Force
- Service years: 1939–1970
- Rank: Air Commodore
- Unit: No. 111 Squadron RAF
- Commands: No. 111 Squadron RAF (1955–1958)
- Conflicts: World War II
- Awards: Air Force Cross with two Bars

Air Commodore Roger Leslie Topp AFC (14 May 1923 – 6 March 2020) was a British Royal Air Force (RAF) officer, test pilot, and aerobatic innovator who founded the Black Arrows, a predecessor to the Red Arrows, the RAF's premier aerobatic display team. Topp is best known for leading the Black Arrows to achieve a world record for the largest number of aircraft looped in formation—22 Hawker Hunters—at the 1958 Farnborough Air Show, a record that remains unbroken.

== Early life ==
Roger Leslie Topp was born on 14 May 1923 near Chichester, West Sussex, the son of a farmer. He was educated at North Mundham School and left at age 15 to join the RAF as a boy entrant in the apprenticeship scheme in 1939. He began training at the wireless and radio school at RAF Cranwell, but the outbreak of World War II interrupted his three-year course. After two years, he served as a wireless mechanic at RAF Gosport.

== Military career ==
=== World War II ===
In 1944, Topp was selected for pilot training and sent to Canada under the British Commonwealth Air Training Plan. Upon returning to the UK, with the demand for fighter pilots reduced, he was reassigned to fly gliders due to heavy losses of glider pilots during D-Day and Arnhem. In March 1945, during a glider operation near the Rhine, Topp made a forced landing and destroyed an enemy gun emplacement with an anti-tank rocket launcher, showcasing his courage under pressure.

=== Post-war service ===
Topp elected to remain in the RAF after the war, joining No. 98 Squadron RAF to fly de Havilland Mosquito fighters in Germany with the British Air Forces of Occupation. He later became an instrument flying instructor, training pilots across multiple squadrons, and was awarded his first Air Force Cross (AFC) in 1950 for his instructional work.

In 1950, Topp attended the Empire Test Pilots' School at Farnborough and remained as a test pilot at the Royal Aircraft Establishment (RAE). He conducted high-risk trials, including airborne structural testing of the de Havilland Comet following catastrophic crashes in the Mediterranean, earning a second Bar to his AFC in 1955.

=== Black Arrows and No. 111 Squadron ===
In January 1955, Topp assumed command of No. 111 Squadron RAF ("Treble One") at RAF North Weald, later moving to RAF Wattisham in Suffolk. Facing low morale, he introduced aerobatics to boost the squadron's spirit, forming the Black Arrows in 1956. Under his leadership, the Black Arrows performed a world record-breaking loop of 22 Hawker Hunters at the 1958 Farnborough Air Show, followed by the first-ever 16-aircraft barrel roll. This feat, accomplished on 7 September 1958, remains unmatched for the largest formation loop in aviation history.

Topp also set a speed record on 8 August 1956, flying a Hawker Hunter from Edinburgh to London at an average speed of 717.504 mph, covering 331.6 miles in 27 minutes and 52.8 seconds. He handed over command of No. 111 Squadron and the Black Arrows to Squadron Leader Peter Latham in October 1958.

=== Later career ===
In 1959, Topp was promoted to Wing Commander and served as an air defence operations officer at Brockzetel, Germany. He retired from the RAF in 1970 as an Air Commodore. His aerobatic displays with the Black Arrows laid the groundwork for the formation of the Red Arrows in 1964, which cemented his legacy in RAF aerobatic history.

== Personal life ==
Topp married Audrey Jeffery in May 1945; she predeceased him in 1999. They had a son and a daughter. Known for his modesty, Topp emphasized manners and respect, telling his son, "Manners are paramount, as is respect for others." On his 90th birthday in 2013, he was reunited with his restored Hawker Hunter, named "Blackjack" after his call sign, at Wattisham Airfield Museum.

Topp died on 6 March 2020 in Norwich, Norfolk, aged 96. Tributes highlighted his inspirational role in aerobatic aviation, with historian David Eade noting that Topp's "foresight" influenced the Red Arrows.

== Legacy ==
Topp's leadership of the Black Arrows and their record-breaking performances elevated the RAF's aerobatic reputation, directly influencing the creation of the Red Arrows. His contributions were recognized with three AFCs and widespread admiration within the aviation community. Posts on social media following his death underscored his impact, with one user stating, "Leading 22 Hawker Hunters in a loop is no mean feat! Blue skies, Sir."
