= No. 11 Group RAF =

Royal Air Force operations group

- Group badge
- Active: 1918; 1918–1920; 1936–1960; 1961–1963; 1968–1996; 2018–present
- Country: United Kingdom
- Branch: Royal Air Force
- Type: Group headquarters
- Role: Control of air operations
- Part of: RAF Fighter Command (1936 -1968); RAF Strike Command (1968- 2007); RAF Air Command; (2007 - present)
- Headquarters: RAF High Wycombe
- Mottos: Tutela cordis (Latin for 'Guardians of the heart')

Commanders
- Air Officer Commanding: Air Vice-Marshal Steve Kilvington
- Notable commanders: Air Vice-Marshal Keith Park

No. 11 Group is a group in the Royal Air Force first formed in 1918. It had been formed and disbanded for various periods during the 20th century before disbanding in 1996 and reforming again in 2018. Its most famous service was in 1940 in the Battle of Britain during the Second World War, when it was the part of RAF Fighter Command that defended London and the south-east of the United Kingdom from attacks by the German Luftwaffe.

It was reformed in late 2018 as a "multi-domain operations group" to ensure the service thinks and acts in a networked way. Today the group commands and controls air operations worldwide. It provides Air Defence of the UK through the National Air & Space Operations Centre, the ability to deploy with other services and nations with the Joint Force Air Component and projecting air power in the Middle East through 83 Expeditionary Air Group (EAG)."

== History ==
=== First World War ===
No. 11 Group was first formed on 1 April 1918 in No. 2 Area as No. 11 (Equipment) Group, and was transferred to South-Western Area the next month on 8 May. The Group was disbanded on 17 May 1918.

=== Inter-war years ===
The next incarnation of the Group occurred on 22 August 1918 when it was formed as part of the North-Western Area. On 6 February 1920, Group captain Ian Bonham-Carter took command and three months later, in May 1920, 11 Group was reduced in status to No. 11 Wing. The Group was reformed on 1 May 1936 as No. 11 (Fighter) Group by renaming Fighting Area. On 14 July 1936, 11 Group became the first RAF Fighter Command Group responsible for the air-defence of southern England, including London.

=== Second World War, 1939 to 1945 ===
No.11 Group was organised with the Dowding System of fighter control. Group Headquarters was at Hillingdon House, located at RAF Uxbridge in the London Borough of Hillingdon. The Group operations room was underground in what is now known as the Battle of Britain Bunker. Commands were passed to the sector airfields, each of which was in charge of several airfields and fighter squadrons. The sector airfields were:

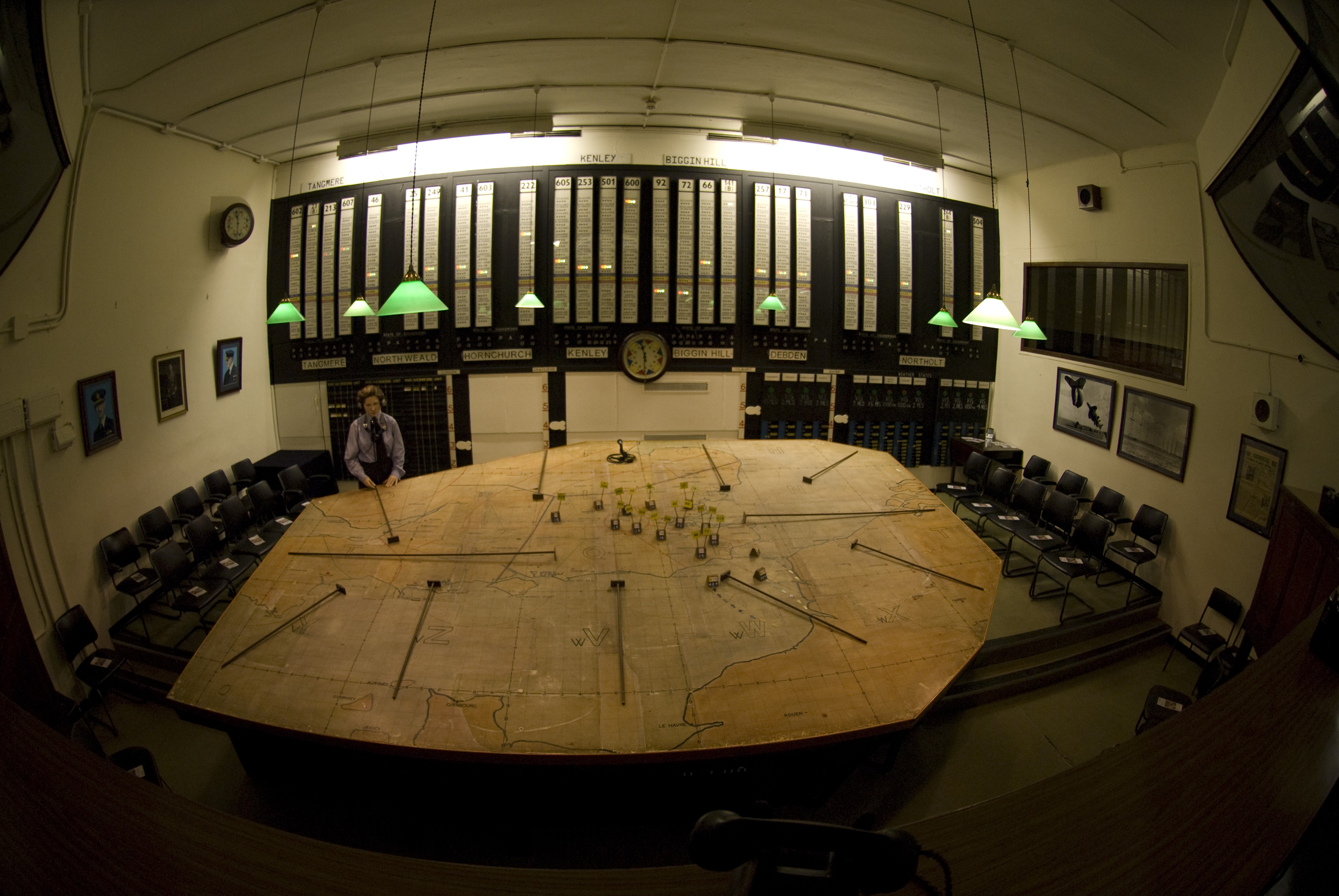
The 11 Group Operations Room in the "Battle of Britain Bunker" at RAF Uxbridge.

Sector A:

- RAF Tangmere (Sector HQ)
- RAF Westhampnett

Sector B:

- RAF Kenley (Sector HQ)
- RAF Croydon
- RAF Redhill

Sector C:

- RAF Biggin Hill (Sector HQ)
- RAF Hawkinge
- RAF Friston

Sector D:

- RAF Hornchurch (Sector HQ)
- RAF Rochford
- RAF Manston

Sector E:

- RAF North Weald (Sector HQ)
- RAF Stapleford Tawney

Sector F:

- RAF Debden (Sector HQ)

Sector Y:

- RAF Middle Wallop (Sector HQ)
- RAF Odiham

Sector Z:

- RAF Northolt (Sector HQ)
- RAF Hendon

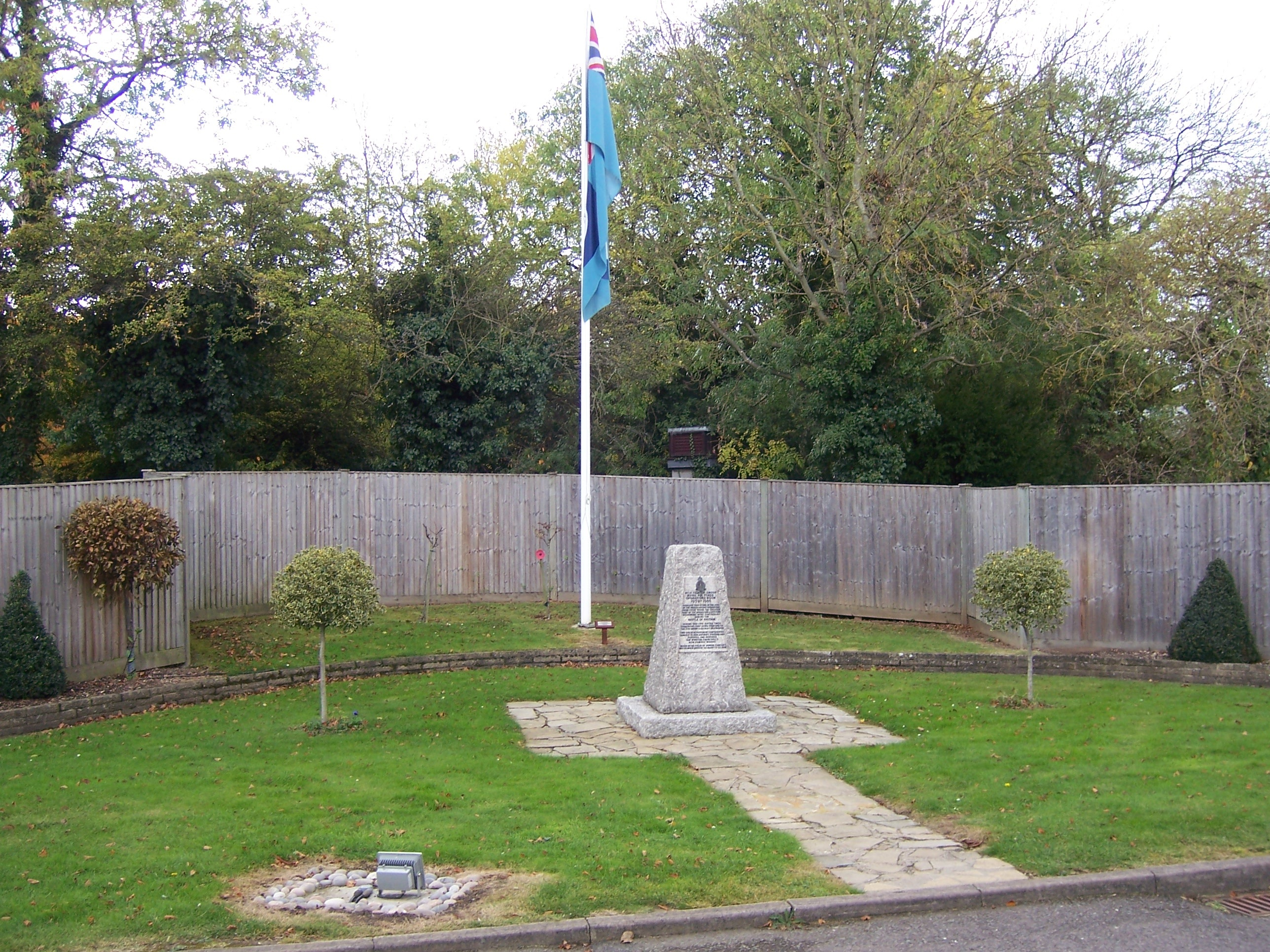
A memorial to the No. 11 Group underground operations room alongside the RAF ensign at RAF Uxbridge.

==== Battle of Britain 1940 ====
The most famous period of the Group was during the Battle of Britain when it bore the brunt of the German aerial assault. Pilots posted to squadrons in 11 Group knew that they would be in constant action, while pilots and squadrons transferred from No.11 Group knew that they were going to somewhere comparatively safer. During the Battle of Britain, the Group was commanded by New Zealander Air vice-marshal Keith Park. While supported by the commanders (AOCs) of No. 10 Group and No. 13 Group, he received insufficient support from the AOC of 12 Group, Air Vice Marshal Trafford Leigh-Mallory, who used the Big Wing controversy to criticise Park's tactics. Leigh-Mallory's lack of support compromised Fighter Command at a critical time and the controversy caused problems for Park. When the Battle of Britain was over, Leigh-Mallory, acting with Air marshal Sholto Douglas, conspired to have Park removed from his position (along with the Commander-in-Chief of Fighter Command, Air chief marshal Hugh Dowding). Leigh-Mallory then took over command of 11 Group.

=== Post-war ===
After the war in December 1951, No.11 Group consisted of the Southern and Metropolitan sectors. The Southern Sector included 1 Squadron and No. 29/22 Squadrons at RAF Tangmere and 54 Squadron and 247 (China-British) Squadron at RAF Odiham. The Metropolitan Sector had 25 Squadron at RAF West Malling, 41/253 Squadron at RAF Biggin Hill, 56/87 Squadron and 63 Squadron at RAF Waterbeach, 64 Squadron and 65 (East India) Squadron at RAF Duxford, 72 Squadron at RAF North Weald, 85/145 at RAF West Malling with Gloster Meteor NF.11s, and 257 (Burma) Squadron and 263 (Fellowship of the Bellows) Squadron at RAF Wattisham. Denoted by a '/', a short-lived RAF postwar scheme saw several squadrons linked, where two squadron numbers' heritage was carried on within one single unit. The administrative control of the Royal Observer Corps, which had played a crucial role in the success of the Dowding system during the war, continued to be held by No.11 Group until the ROC was stood down in 1996.

From 1951 11 Group also had operational control of the U.S. 81st Fighter-Interceptor Wing for several years.

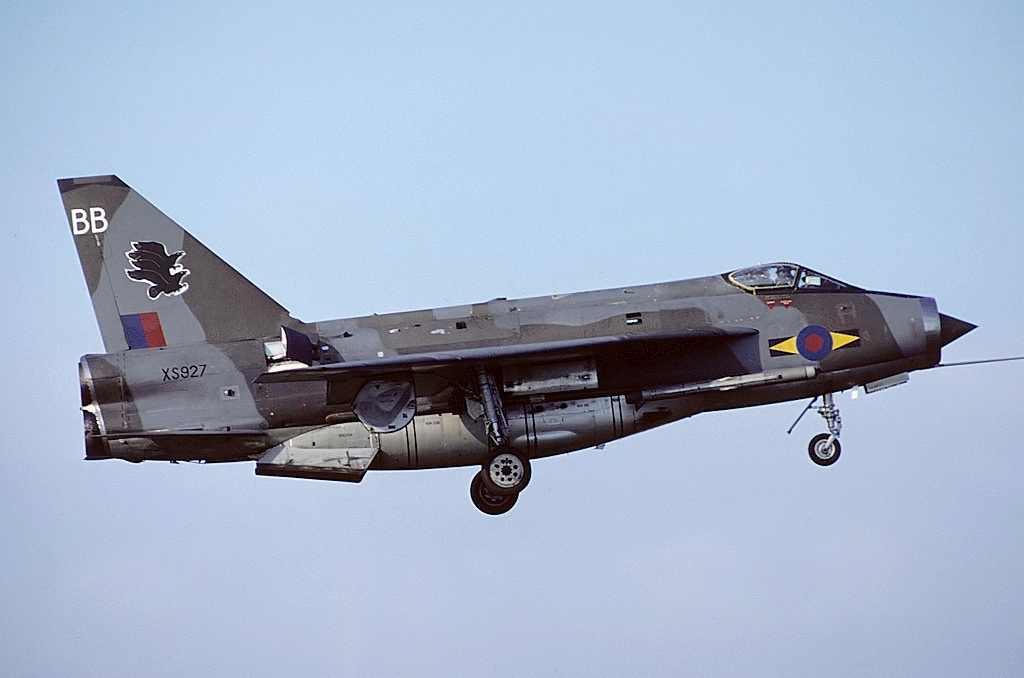
A No. 11 Squadron English Electric F6 based at RAF Binbrook, part of No. 11 Group.

In 1960 Fighter Command was re-organised and 11 Group was disbanded on 31 December 1960, to reform one day later when 13 Group was renamed 11 Group. On 1 April 1963, the Group was replaced by No. 11 (Northern) Sector at RAF Leconfield which controlled Fighter Command airfields and units within Northern England. On 17 March 1965 the sector absorbed No. 13 (Scotland) Sector RAF which was formed on 1 April 1963 at Boulmer and 11 Sector moved to Boulmer. This incarnation lasted until Fighter Command was absorbed into the new Strike Command on 30 April 1968 and became 11 Group. 11 Sector became Sector South and No. 12 Sector RAF was absorbed and became Sector North. Group Headquarters shifted to RAF Bentley Priory in north-west London and took responsibility for the UK Air Defence Region (UK ADR). The English Electric Lightning F.1 entered service in 1960 and the McDonnell Douglas Phantom FGR.2 in 1969, with 43 (China-British) Squadron at RAF Leuchars.

The group was renamed 11 (Air Defence) Group in January 1986. In the early 1990s, the front-line force consisted of 56 Squadron and 74 (Trinidad) Squadrons flying Phantoms from RAF Wattisham, 5 Squadron and 29 Squadron flying the Panavia Tornado F3 from RAF Coningsby, 11 Squadron, 23 Squadron, and 25 Squadron flying the Tornado F3 from RAF Leeming and 43 Squadron and 111 Squadron at RAF Leuchars; 8 Squadron flew Boeing E-3D Sentry AEW1 from RAF Waddington, 5 Squadron and 11 Squadron had been the last units flying the English Electric Lightning F.6 from RAF Binbrook until 1988; 25 Squadron and 85 Squadron had been operating Bristol Bloodhound surface-to-air missiles and re-equipped with the Tornado and disbanded in 1989 and on 10 July 1991 respectively. The Wattisham Phantom Wing was disbanded relatively quickly following the end of the Cold War; 23 Squadron was disbanded in March 1994.

On 9 January 1992, Sector's South and North combined. On 1 April 1996, 11 Group amalgamated with 18 Group to form 11/18 Group. Air Vice Marshal Anthony Bagnall, who took over on 15 July 1994, was the Group's last commander.

=== 2018 reformation ===
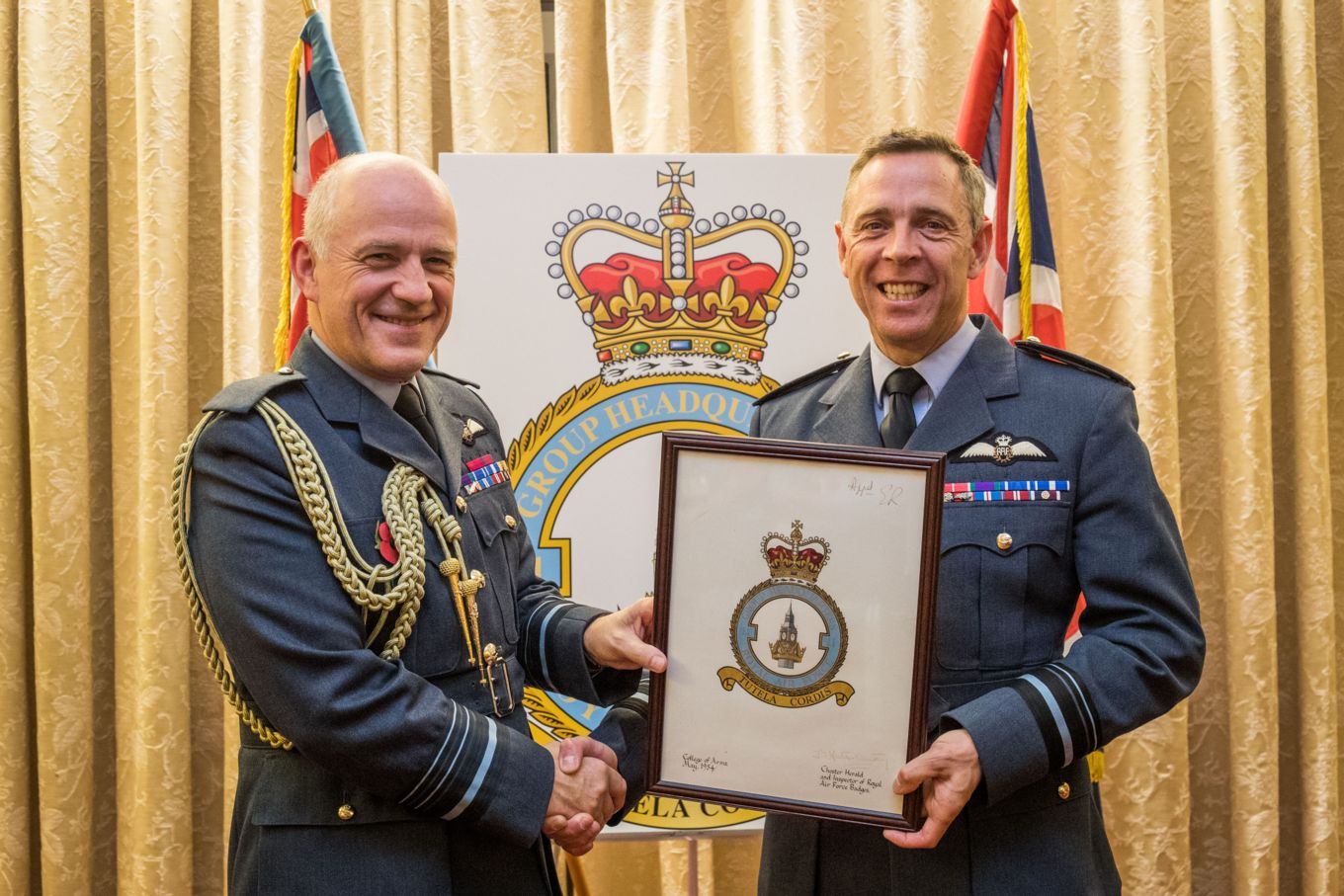
Air Marshal Stuart Atha presenting 11 Group's badge to Air Vice-Marschal Ian Duguid in 2018

On 11 July 2018, Air Chief Marshal Sir Stephen Hillier announced at the Air Power Conference that 11 Group would reform as a "multi-domain operations group", to ensure the RAF thinks and acts in a networked way and combining air, space and cyber-warfare elements to create an integrated force. No increase in the number of senior officers or staff at headquarters was proposed as part of the reformation. The group reformed at a ceremony at RAF High Wycombe in Buckinghamshire on 1 November 2018, when Air Vice-Marshal Ian Duguid took command.

No. 11 Group included the capabilities of the Chief of Staff Operations and the Air Battle Staff, comprising the deployable Joint Force Air Component (JFAC), the National Air & Space Operations Centre (NASOC) and the Executive Team. The group also included the RAF Battle Management Force. The group was to ensure that the large amounts of data, intelligence and information contributes to the planning and execution of operations in the domains of air, space and cyber.

== Role and operations ==
No. 11 Group, under the leadership of the Global Air Component Commander, provides command and control for air operations on around the globe. It ensures UK air defence via the National Air & Space Operations Centre (NASOC), enables joint deployments with allied services and nations through the Joint Force Air Component, and conducts operations in the Middle East through No. 83 Expeditionary Air Group.

No. 11 Group is based at the NASOC, located at RAF High Wycombe in Buckinghamshire.

== Component units ==
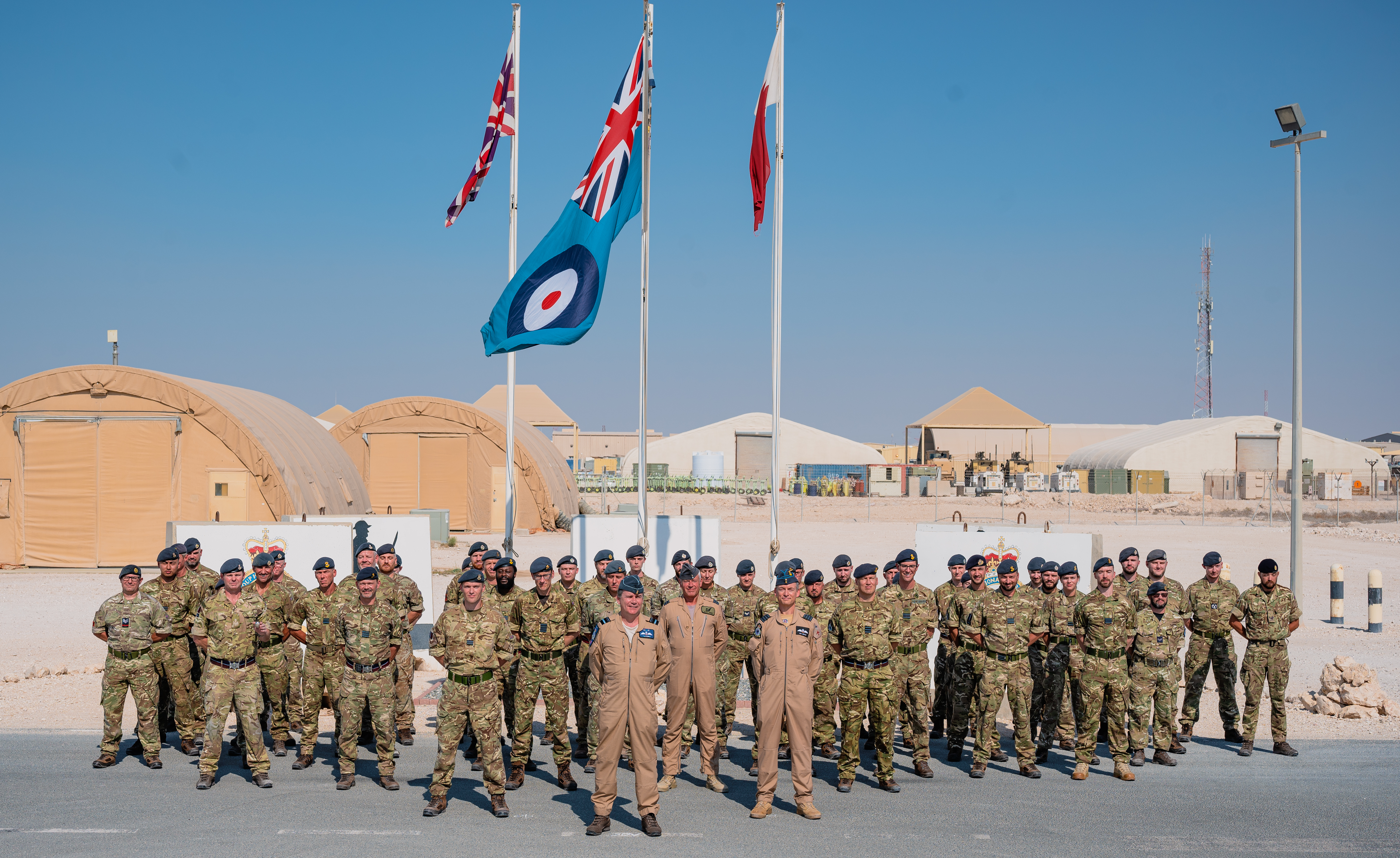
Personnel assigned to the No. 83 Expeditionary Air Group, part of No. 11 Group, stand in formation

As of November 2025, No. 11 Group comprises the following elements and units. Unless indicated otherwise, subordinate units are located at the same location as the unit they report to.

- No. 11 Group Headquarters (RAF High Wycombe)
  - No. 83 Expeditionary Air Group (Al Udeid Air Base, Qatar)
    - No. 901 Expeditionary Air Wing
    - No. 902 Expeditionary Air Wing
    - No. 903 Expeditionary Air Wing
    - No. 906 Expeditionary Air Wing
  - Intelligence Reserves Wing (RAF Waddington)
    - No. 7006 (VR) Intelligence Squadron (RAuxAF)
    - No. 7010 (VR) Photographic Interpretation Squadron (RAuxAF)
    - No. 7630 (VR) Intelligence Squadron (RAuxAF)
  - Joint Air Liaison Organisation
  - Joint Force Air Component
  - National Air & Space Operations Centre

== Heritage ==
The group's badge depicts the clock tower of the Palace of Westminster surrounded by an astral crown. The tower indicates London, the heart of the Empire, with whose safety the group was charged during the Second World War. The hands of the clock are at 11 o'clock to represent the time of the Armistice of the First World War and the number of the group. the badge was awarded in 1940.

The group's motto is Tutela cordis (Latin for 'Guardians of the heart').

== List of group commanders ==
1936 to 1963

- 14 July 1936 Air Vice-Marshal Philip Joubert de la Ferté
- 7 September 1936 Air Vice-Marshal Leslie Gossage
- January 1940 Air Vice-Marshal William Welsh
- 20 April 1940 Air Vice-Marshal Keith Park
- 18 December 1940 Air Vice-Marshal Trafford Leigh-Mallory
- 28 November 1942 Air Vice-Marshal Hugh Saunders
- 1 November 1944 Air Vice-Marshal John Cole-Hamilton
- 20 July 1945 Air Vice-Marshal Dermot Boyle
- 24 April 1946 Air Vice-Marshal S D Macdonald
- 1 June 1948 Air Vice-Marshal Stanley Vincent
- 9 January 1950 Air Vice-Marshal Thomas Pike
- 5 July 1951 Air Vice-Marshal The Earl of Bandon
- 1 November 1953 Air Vice-Marshal Hubert Patch
- 16 January 1956 Air Vice-Marshal V S Bowling
- 12 January 1959 Air Vice-Marshal Alick Foord-Kelcey
- 1 January 1961 Air Vice-Marshal Harold Maguire
- 13 January 1962 Air Vice-Marshal Gareth Clayton

1968 to 1996

- 30 April 1968 Air Vice-Marshal R I Jones
- 2 February 1970 Air Vice-Marshal Ivor Broom
- 6 December 1972 Air Vice-Marshal Robert Freer
- 15 March 1975 Air Vice-Marshal William Harbison
- 14 March 1977 Air Vice-Marshal Donald Hall
- 3 September 1977 Air Vice-Marshal Peter Latham
- 7 January 1981 Air Vice-Marshal Peter Harding
- 11 August 1982 Air Vice-Marshal Kenneth Hayr
- 1 August 1985 Air Vice-Marshal Michael Stear
- 15 July 1987 Air Vice-Marshal Roger Palin
- 17 March 1989 Air Vice-Marshal Bill Wratten
- 16 September 1991 Air Vice-Marshal John Allison
- 15 July 1994 Air Vice-Marshal Anthony Bagnall

2018 to present

- 1 October 2018 Air Vice-Marshal Ian Duguid
- 1 December 2021 Air Vice-Marshal Philip Robinson
- 25 August 2023 Air Vice-Marshal Tom Burke
- November 2025 Air Vice-Marshal Steve Kilvington

== See also ==
- List of Battle of Britain airfields
- List of Battle of Britain squadrons
- List of Royal Air Force groups
