= Philip Robinson (RAF officer) =

Royal Air Force Air Vice-Marshal

Air Vice-Marshal Philip Robinson CBE DFC & Two Bars
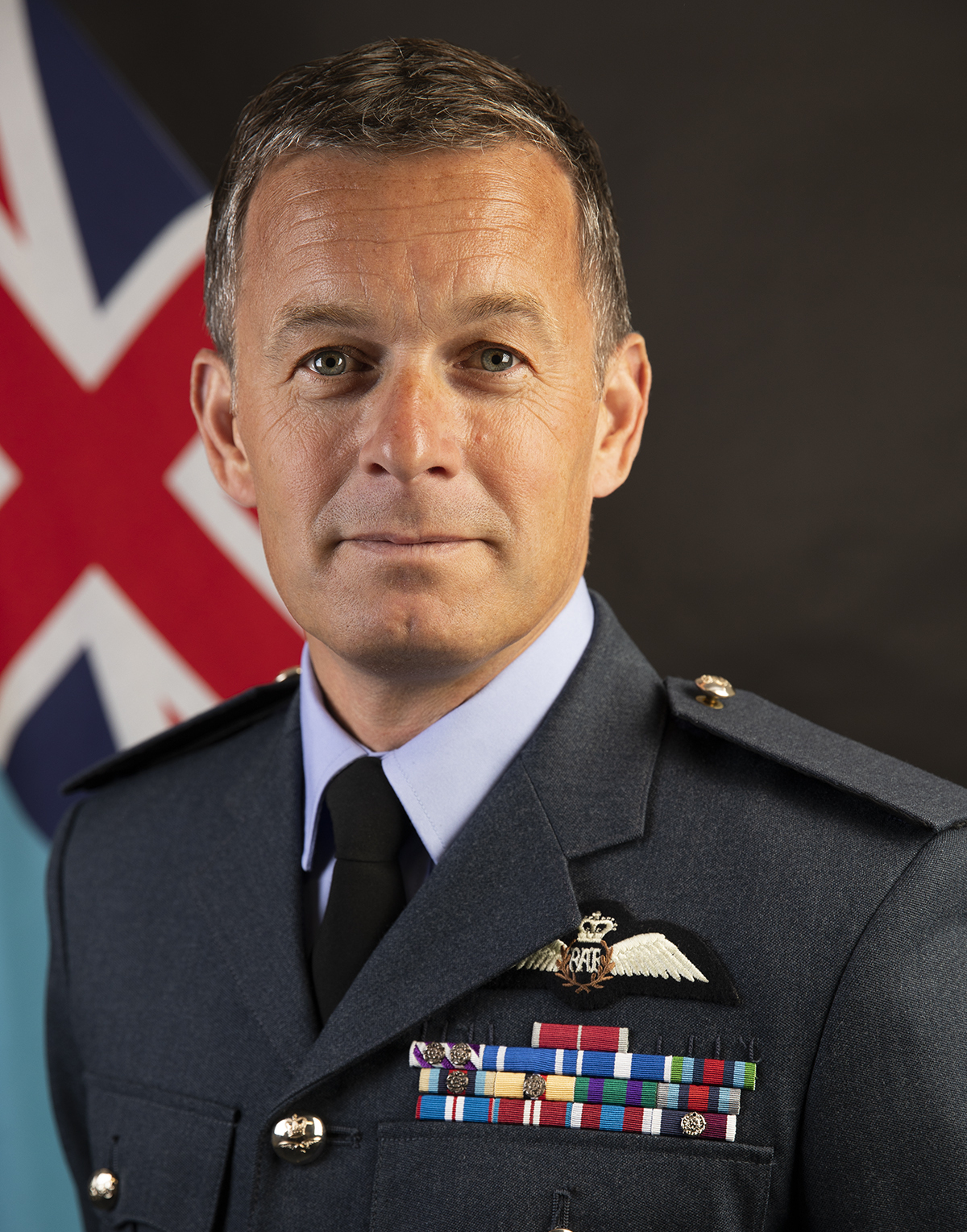
- Air Vice-Marshal Robinson in 2022
- Military career
- Allegiance: United Kingdom
- Branch: Royal Air Force
- Service years: 1992–present
- Rank: Air Vice Marshal
- Commands: No. 11 Group RAF (2021–23); Combined Air and Space Operations Centre (2020–21); RAF Odiham (2015–17); Joint Special Forces Aviation Wing (2010–12); No. 7 Squadron RAF (c. 2005–06)
- Conflicts: Kosovo War; Sierra Leone Civil War; War in Afghanistan; Iraq War
- Awards: Commander of the Order of the British Empire; Distinguished Flying Cross & Two Bars

Air Vice-Marshal Philip Jeremy Robinson, CBE, DFC & Two Bars is a decorated British pilot and senior Royal Air Force officer.

== RAF career ==
Robinson was commissioned into the Royal Air Force on 7 May 1992 as an acting pilot officer; he was regraded to pilot officer on 7 May 1993. He was promoted to flying officer on 7 May 1994, and to flight lieutenant on 7 November 1997.

Having completed his flying training, Robinson was posted to No. 18 Squadron RAF who were then based in Germany. He returned to England in 1997 and was posted to No. 7 Squadron RAF: he was made commanding officer of the squadron in 2005. From 2010 to 2012, he was commanding officer of the Joint Special Forces Aviation Wing.

Robinson flew Chinooks with the RAF, and also the Army Air Corps' Lynx. He flew in operations in Bosnia, Albania, Northern Ireland, Kosovo, Sierra Leone, Iraq, Lebanon and Afghanistan. He was awarded the Distinguished Flying Cross (DFC) three times for service during the War in Afghanistan and the Iraq War.

Robinson was promoted to group captain on 10 September 2012. From October 2015 to October 2017, he was the commanding officer of RAF Odiham and the UK Chinook Force Commander.

He is a graduate of the United States' Capstone Military Leadership Program, and the United Kingdom's Advanced Command and Staff Course and the Higher Command and Staff Course.

Robinson served as Assistant Chief of Staff at the Permanent Joint Headquarters from April 2019, before being appointed Director Combined Air and Space Operations Centre at Al Udeid Air Base, Qatar, in December 2020. In December 2021, he was promoted to air vice-marshal and took up the appointment of air officer commanding (AOC) No. 11 Group RAF. In September 2023, he moved post to become director of the National Defence Plan Development Team. In March 2024, he became Chief of Staff (Operations) at Permanent Joint Headquarters.

== Honours ==
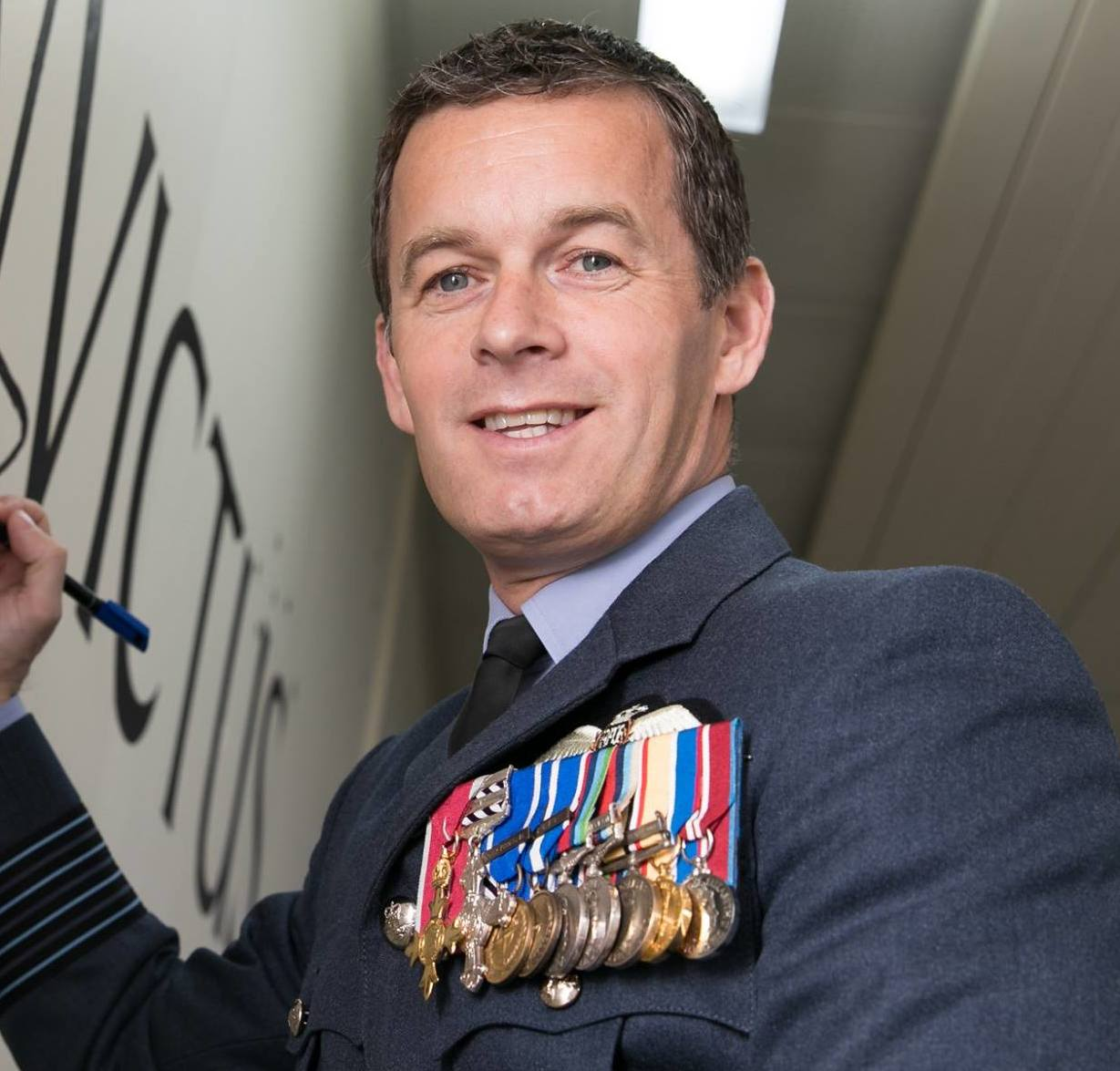
Group Captain Robinson in 2017

On 29 October 2002, Robinson was awarded the Distinguished Flying Cross (DFC) "in recognition of gallant and distinguished services in Afghanistan during the period 1st October 2001 to 31st March 2002". On 31 October 2003, he was awarded a Bar to his DFC "for gallant and distinguished services in Iraq during the period 19th March to 19th April 2003". On 25 July 2008, he was awarded a second Bar to his DFC "in recognition of gallant and distinguished services in Afghanistan during the period 1st October 2007 to 31st March 2008".

He was appointed an Officer of the Order of the British Empire in the 2013 Birthday Honours, and advanced to Commander of the Order of the British Empire in the 2021 New Year Honours.

Robinson is a recipient of the Royal Air Force Long Service and Good Conduct Medal with one clasp.

Military offices
Preceded by Ian Duguid	Air Officer Commanding No. 11 Group RAF; 2021–2023	Succeeded by Tom Burke
