= Donald Hall (RAF officer) =

Royal Air Force Air Marshal (1930-1999)

Sir Donald Hall
- Born: 11 November 1930; Kingston upon Hull, England
- Died: 12 January 1999 (aged 68)
- Military career
- Allegiance: United Kingdom
- Branch: Royal Air Force
- Service years: 1949–1986
- Rank: Air Marshal
- Commands: No. 38 Group (1980–83); No. 11 Group (1977); RAF Akrotiri (1973–75); Empire Test Pilots' School (1971–73); No. 111 Squadron (1966–68)
- Awards: Knight Commander of the Order of the Bath; Commander of the Order of the British Empire; Air Force Cross

Air Marshal Sir Donald Percy Hall, KCB, CBE, AFC, FRAeS (11 November 1930 – 12 January 1999) was a Royal Air Force officer who served as Deputy Chief of Defence Staff (Systems) from 1983 to 1986.

== Flying career ==
Educated at Hull Grammar School and the Royal Air Force College Cranwell, Hall was commissioned into the Royal Air Force in 1952. He became Officer Commanding No. 111 Squadron in 1966. He went on to be Junior Members Co-ordinator at the Imperial Defence College in 1968, Officer Commanding the Empire Test Pilots' School in 1971 and Station Commander of RAF Akrotiri in 1973. After that, he became Senior Air Staff Officer at Headquarters No. 11 Group in 1975, Air Officer Commanding No. 11 Group in March 1977 and Assistant Chief of the Air Staff (Operational Requirements) in September 1977. He went on to be Air Officer Commanding No. 38 Group in 1980 and Deputy Chief of the Defence Staff (Systems) in 1983 before retiring in 1986.

In retirement he became Deputy Chairman of GEC-Marconi.

== Honours ==
Hall was awarded the Air Force Cross in the 1963 New Year Honours, appointed a Commander of the Order of the British Empire (CBE) in the 1975 New Year Honours, appointed a Companion of the Order of the Bath (CB) in the 1981 Birthday Honours, and promoted to Knight Commander of the Order of the Bath (KCB) in the 1984 New Year Honours.

== Family ==
In 1953 he married Joyce Warburton; they had two daughters, Melanie and Jilly.

Military offices
Preceded by William Harbison	Air Officer Commanding No. 11 Group; 1977	Succeeded by Peter Latham
Preceded by Sir Maurice Johnston	Air Officer Commanding No. 38 Group; 1980–1983	Succeeded by Joseph Gilbert
Preceded by David Parry-Evans	Deputy Chief of the Defence Staff (Systems); 1983–1986	Succeeded by Sir Jeremy Black
