= Tom Burke (RAF officer) =

Royal Air Force Air Vice-Marshal

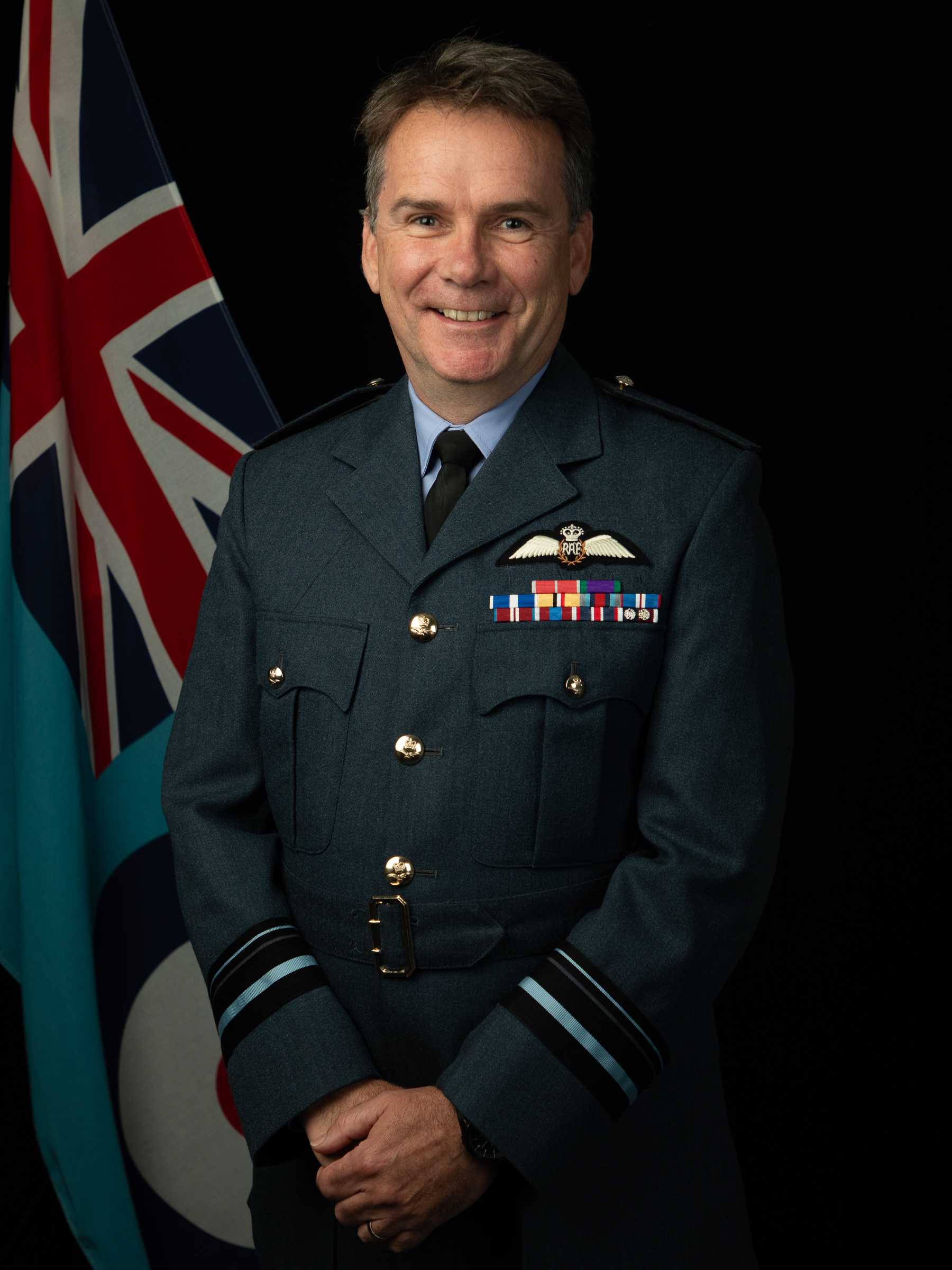
- Born: 19 May 1970 (age 56)
- Military career
- Allegiance: United Kingdom
- Branch: Royal Air Force
- Service years: 1992–present
- Rank: Air Vice-Marshal
- Commands: No. 11 Group RAF; RAF Waddington; No. 39 Squadron RAF
- Conflicts: Balkans; Iraq War; War in Afghanistan; Operation Shader
- Awards: Commander of the Order of the British Empire

Air Vice-Marshal Thomas James Patrick Burke, CBE (born 19 May 1970) is a British pilot and senior Royal Air Force officer, who serves as Vice Director United States European Command.

== Early life ==
Burke was born on 19 May 1970 in Downpatrick, Northern Ireland. Having received a university cadetship, he studied at the University of Southampton, graduating with a Bachelor of Science degree in 1991.

== RAF career ==
Burke was station commander of RAF Waddington from November 2017 to December 2019. He was promoted air commodore on 6 January 2020 upon appointment as assistant chief of staff operations, serving as such until he was appointed director of the Combined Air and Space Operations Centre at the Al Udeid Air Base in Qatar in December 2022. He was promoted to air vice-marshal and appointed Air Officer Commanding No. 11 Group RAF from August 2023 to November 2025. In January 2026 he took up the position as Vice Director United States European Command.

Burke was appointed a Commander of the Order of the British Empire in the 2021 New Year Honours.

Military offices
Preceded by Philip Robinson	Air Officer Commanding No. 11 Group RAF; 2023–2025	Succeeded by Steve Kilvington
