= Ivor Broom =

Royal Air Force Air Marshal (1920–2003)

Sir Ivor Broom
- Born: 2 June 1920; Cardiff, Wales
- Died: 24 January 2003 (aged 82)
- Military career
- Allegiance: United Kingdom
- Branch: Royal Air Force
- Service years: 1940–1977
- Rank: Air Marshal
- Commands: No. 11 Group (1970–72); Central Flying School (1968–70); RAF Bruggen (1962–64); No. 57 Squadron (1953–54); No. 28 Squadron (1946–48); No. 163 Squadron (1945–46)
- Conflicts: Second World War
- Awards: Knight Commander of the Order of the Bath; Commander of the Order of the British Empire; Distinguished Service Order; Distinguished Flying Cross & Two Bars; Air Force Cross; Queen's Commendation for Valuable Service in the Air

Air Marshal Sir Ivor Gordon Broom, KCB, CBE, DSO, DFC & Two Bars, AFC (2 June 1920 – 24 January 2003) was a senior Royal Air Force commander, and a decorated bomber pilot of the Second World War.

Ivor Gordon Broom was born on 2 June 1920 in Cardiff, Wales, to parents Albert and Janet Broom. He had 2 siblings: an older sister, Eva Cameron Broom, who died aged 16 of Tuberculosis, and an older brother, Godfrey Kitchener Broom. They all grew up together in Cardiff.

Ivor joined the Royal Air Force as a trainee pilot in early 1940 at the age of 19. Eleven months later, he was a sergeant pilot on 114 Squadron undertaking low-level daylight bombing raids in Blenheim aircraft. He flew similar operations from Malta in 1941 with Nos 105 and 107 Squadrons and while there was commissioned after No.107 Squadron had lost all their officers.

In July 1942, Broom returned home to marry Jessie Cooper. Together they had a son, David Broom, born on 18 March 1944, and a daughter Diane Broom, born on 8 July 1945.

In 1943, he became a instructor on Mosquitos and by the time World War Two had ended was a 24 year-old wing commander in charge of No.163 Mosquito bomber squadron in the Pathfinder Force. He completed over 100 bombing missions, was awarded the distinguished flying cross and two bars and also made a member of the distinguish service order. After victory in Europe he moved to the east while his wife was pregnant with their third child. Sadly Ivor lost his rank of commander and was fortunate enough to become the commanding officer of No.28 squadron. One of the only two spitfire squadrons still in the RAF. He continued to keep close to flying and in the early 50s became the commanding officer of No.57 squadron the third jet bomber squadrons to form in the RAF. In 1956 he was awarded the Air Force cross for a record breaking flight in a Canberra from Ottawa to London.

His various movements are too many to catalogue and include C.O of bomber command development unit, C.O. Of RAF Bruggen, and commandant of the central flying school. In the early 70s he was, for three years in charge of the UK’s air defence group. Ivor was then placed in charge of the National Air Traffic services and became the first serving officer to become a member of the board of the civil aviation authority. He was then knighted in 1975 and retired as an Air Marshal in 1977. Since leaving the RAF he was actively engaged in civil aviation. He retired from being chairman of two major aviation companies. Ivor died on 24 January 2003, in the company of his wife of 61 years.

== Early years ==
Ivor Gordon Broom was born in Cardiff, Wales and educated at the Boy's County School, Pontypridd. At 17, Broom passed the Civil Service Exam and began work with the Inland Revenue.

== RAF career ==
Broom learned to fly in 1940 while the Battle of Britain was being fought, and was posted to No. 114 Squadron in 1941. The squadron were flying Bristol Blenheim light bombers which were flown in low-level daylight operations against Channel and North Sea shipping as well as targets along the French, Dutch and German coasts.

Broom took part in the successful raid against the Goldenburg-Werk lignite power stations, Knapsack, Germany in August 1941.

In late 1941, while still a sergeant, Broom was detailed to lead a flight of six Blenheims to reinforce Singapore, en route the bombers landed on Malta which was under siege at the time by the Axis. When they landed on the island, Air Vice Marshal Hugh Pughe Lloyd commandeered Broom and his aircraft to replace the islands losses, the other five Blenheims flying on to Singapore.

Broom joined No. 107 Squadron whose Blenheims were incurring heavy losses while attacking Axis shipping between Italy and North Africa as well as land targets in Italy and North Africa. When No. 107 Squadron had lost all its officers, Lloyd told Broom "Move into the officers' mess. We will sort the paperwork out later". Broom was promoted to Pilot officer.

On 17 November 1941 he bombed and set on fire a 4,000-ton ship in the Gulf of Sirte (most likely the Priaruggia). After flying 43 sorties he was awarded the Distinguished Flying Cross (DFC) and returned to Britain in January 1942.

Broom undertook an instructors course at the Central Flying School and then spent a year training new Blenheim pilots how to perform low level attacks as an instructor in No. 13 OTU.

In May 1943 Broom joined No. 1655 MTU as an instructor. In May 1944, Broom joined No. 571 Squadron flying the De Havilland Mosquito XVI as part of the Light Night Striking Force (LNSF) where he teamed up with his navigator Flight lieutenant Tommy Broom. They were known as "The Flying Brooms" and had a pair of crossed broomsticks painted on the nose of their aircraft. They remained friends until Ivor's death in 2003.

The Mosquito was modified to carry a 4,000lb bomb known as "cookies" and carried no defensive armament. They made numerous raids over Berlin.

In September 1944 Broom was appointed Flight Commander in No. 128 Squadron, still part of the LNSF.

In January 1945 Broom was appointed as Commanding Officer of No. 163 Squadron. His navigator Tommy Broom joined him as the squadron's navigation leader. They remained together until the end of the war. For leading raids on Berlin, Ivor was awarded a Distinguished Service Order and Tommy a DFC.

After the war ended, Broom dropped rank to squadron leader to command No. 28 Squadron flying Spitfires in Singapore. In 1948 he returned home and dropped rank again, to flight lieutenant, to attend staff college. After passing out he resumed his career as a Squadron Leader and learnt to fly jets.

In 1953 he became Commanding Officer of No. 57 Squadron which had been equipped with Canberra jet bombers. He flew a specially modified Canberra from Ottawa to London via the North Pole, Broom was awarded the Air Force Cross. In 1956 Broom became responsible for the Bomber Command Development Unit at Wittering. In 1959 he moved into the Air Secretary's department followed by, in 1962 becoming station commander at RAF Bruggen in Germany. Subsequently, he became in 1964 a staff officer at the Air Ministry and in 1966 was appointed Director of Organisation (Establishments).

In 1968 Broom became Commandant of Central Flying School. He remained at this post until being appointed as Air Officer Commanding (AOC) No. 11 Group. In 1972 Broom was appointed CB (Companion of the Bath)

In January 1973, Broom was appointed Deputy Controller, National Air Traffic Control and in May 1974 became Controller. This joint civilian and military organisation is responsible for control of all air movements in UK controlled airspace.

In 1975 Broom was appointed a Knight Commander of the Order of the Bath.

== Retirement ==
Broom retired in July 1977 and in retirement, held an appointment as a director of one of Gerald Carroll's Carroll Group companies.

Broom was also a great supporter of charities, these included:

- Vice-president of the Royal Air Forces Association (RAFA)
- The RAF Benevolent Fund
- President of the Blenheim Society
- President of the Mosquito Aircrew Association
- The Bomber Command Association

Military offices
Preceded by Richard Jones	Air Officer Commanding No. 11 Group; 1970–1972	Succeeded by Robert Freer
