= Ian W. Duguid =

Royal Air Force Air Vice-Marshal

Ian Duguid
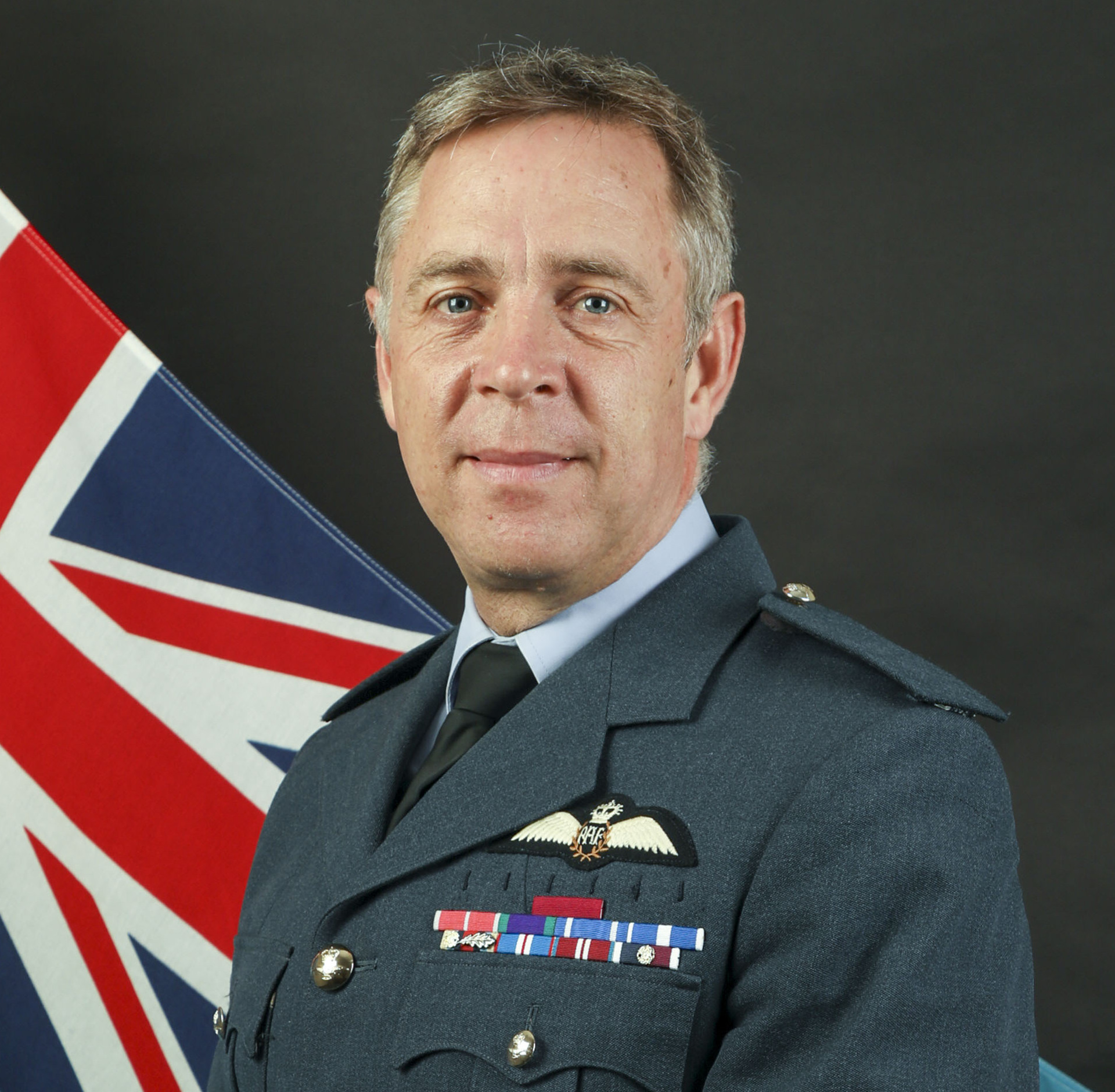
- Duguid in 2021
- Born: 1 December 1966 (age 59)
- Military career
- Allegiance: United Kingdom
- Branch: Royal Air Force
- Service years: 1986–2023
- Rank: Air Vice-Marshal
- Nickname: "Squid"
- Commands: No. 1 Group RAF (2021-2023); No. 11 Group RAF (2018–21); No. 4 Squadron RAF (2006–08)
- Conflicts: War in Afghanistan
- Awards: Companion of the Order of the Bath; Officer of the Order of the British Empire; Mentioned in Despatches

Air Vice-Marshal Ian W. Duguid, CB, OBE (born 1 December 1966) is a retired senior Royal Air Force officer, whose final post was as Air Officer Commanding No. 1 Group RAF, headquartered at RAF High Wycombe in Buckinghamshire. Duguid was a Harrier pilot and Typhoon Force Commander before assuming the role of the Air Officer Commanding of No. 11 Group, which he served as from 2018 to November 2021.

== RAF career ==
Duguid was educated at Scarborough Sixth Form College and King's College London (MSc Defence Studies).

Duguid was commissioned into the Royal Air Force in 1986. While a squadron commander of one of the Harrier squadrons in the 1990s, Duguid was known by the nickname of "Squid". After operational service protecting the Iraqi no-fly zones, he commanded No. 4 Squadron RAF in Afghanistan in 2006 to 2007, for which he was mentioned in despatches. He then became Deputy Assistant Chief of Staff Capability at RAF Air Command in September 2008, Head of Defence Operational Capability at the Ministry of Defence in December 2012 and commander of the Typhoon Force in March 2015. He was appointed Chief of Staff Operations, Headquarters Air Command and Air Officer Commanding No. 11 Group RAF in October 2018 which he served as until November 2021. He was appointed Air Officer Commanding No. 1 Group RAF on 12 November 2021, and retired in May 2023.

Duguid was appointed Officer of the Order of the British Empire (OBE) in the 2009 New Year Honours, and Companion of the Order of the Bath (CB) in the 2021 New Year Honours.

Military offices
Group reformed	Air Officer Commanding No. 11 Group; 2018–2021	Succeeded by Philip Robinson
Preceded by Allan Marshall	Air Officer Commanding No. 1 Group; 2021–2023	Succeeded by Mark Flewin
