= Steve Kilvington =

Royal Air Force officer

Stephen Kilvington
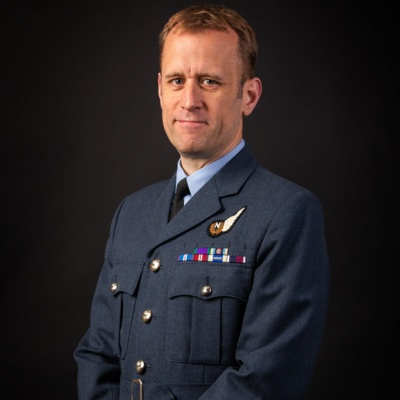
- Kilvington in 2020
- Military career
- Allegiance: United Kingdom
- Branch: Royal Air Force
- Service years: 1996–present
- Rank: Air Vice-Marshal
- Commands: No. 11 Group (2025–); RAF Waddington (2020–22); No. 8 Squadron (2014–16); No. 92 Squadron (2013–14)
- Conflicts: War in Afghanistan; War against the Islamic State
- Awards: Commander of the Order of the British Empire; NATO Meritorious Service Medal

Air Vice-Marshal Stephen Paul Kilvington, CBE is a senior Royal Air Force officer who has served as Air Officer Commanding No. 11 Group RAF since November 2025.

== RAF career ==
Educated at the University of Warwick, Kilvington was commissioned into the Royal Air Force in 1996. After training as a navigator, he was deployed to the Middle East during the War in Afghanistan. He became officer commanding No. 92 Squadron in 2013 and commanded No. 8 Squadron on Operation Shader in 2015, for which he was awarded the NATO Meritorious Service Medal. He then became Air Liaison Officer to the French Air Force in Paris in 2018, and station commander at RAF Waddington in 2020. He went on to be Military Representative to Supreme Headquarters Allied Powers Europe in June 2022, was appointed a Commander of the Order of the British Empire in the 2023 New Year Honours, and became Air Officer Commanding No. 11 Group RAF in November 2025.

Military offices
Preceded by Tom Burke	Air Officer Commanding No. 11 Group; 2025–present	Incumbent
