= Tommy Broom =

- Born: 22 January 1914; Portishead, Somerset
- Died: 18 May 2010 (aged 96)
- Military career
- Allegiance: United Kingdom
- Branch: Royal Air Force
- Service years: 1932–1945
- Rank: Squadron Leader
- Conflicts: Second World War
- Awards: Distinguished Flying Cross & Two Bars

Squadron Leader Thomas John Broom, DFC & Two Bars (22 January 1914 – 18 May 2010) was a Royal Air Force officer who was awarded the Distinguished Flying Cross three times for bomber operations during the Second World War.

== Early life ==
Broom was born in Portishead, Somerset, on 22 January 1914 and educated at Slade Road School.

After leaving school Broom got a job in a local garage. He soon grew bored and, in 1932, joined the Royal Air Force (RAF) where he trained to be a navigator.

== RAF career ==
Broom was mobilised to France at the outbreak of the Second World War, assigned to No. 105 Squadron operating Fairey Battle light bombers.

After the German Blitzkrieg through France in 1940, Broom returned home and transferred to No. 13 Operational Training Unit at Bicester, where he taught navigators the skills required for combat. He returned to No. 105 Squadron in 1942 and completed another tour, after which he was posted to 1655 Mosquito Training Unit where he remained until May 1944. Subsequent to this he returned to front-line flying until the end of the war, with Nos. 571, 128 and 163 (Mosquito) Squadrons. Broom completed in all 83 operations.

It was while flying with No. 571 Squadron that he became the navigator for Ivor Broom. They remained lifelong friends until Ivor Broom's death in 2003.

== Later life ==
Broom left the RAF in September 1945. He worked for the Control Commission in Germany. Unable to speak German, he was allocated an interpreter, a young German war widow. In July 1948 they married and returned to Portishead in 1949.

Later Broom worked in the accounts department of Esso Petroleum.

His wife, Annemarie, died in 1963.

Apart from the war years and his time in Germany, Broom spent all his life in Portishead.
