= Black Arrows =

Blue Diamonds Royal Air Force Aerobatic Team
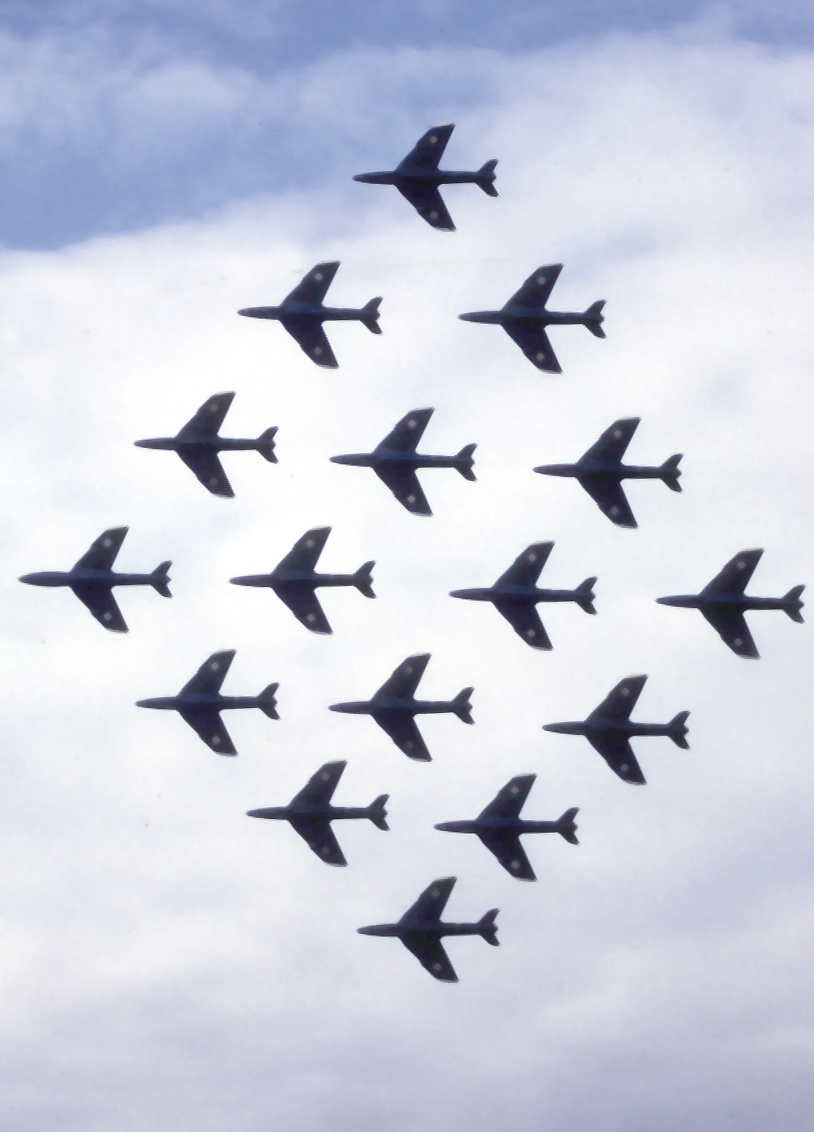
- Sixteen Hawker Hunters of the Black Arrows perform aerobatics at the Farnborough Air Show, England.
- Country: United Kingdom
- Branch: Royal Air Force
- Role: Aerobatic flight display team
- Garrison/HQ: RAF Wattisham; RAF North Weald

The Black Arrows, one of the predecessors to the current Royal Air Force Aerobatic Team the Red Arrows, were an aerobatic demonstration team formed in 1956 by Squadron Leader Roger L. Topp, then Commanding Officer 111 Squadron ("treble-one"). One of the many memorable feats accomplished by the Black Arrows was the execution of a world record loop of 22 Hawker Hunters in formation at the Society of British Aircraft Constructors' show at Farnborough in 1958. This was a world record for the greatest number of aircraft looped in formation, and remains unbroken to this day. After the loop the Black Arrows performed the world's first 16 aircraft barrel roll. Roger Topp handed over the lead of the Black Arrows to Squadron Leader Peter Latham in late 1958. Latham expanded the size of the team to nine aircraft from the original five and led the Squadron for two years.

No. 111 Squadron was formed at RAF North Weald where they received the Hunter before moving to RAF Wattisham in Suffolk. Until 1961, the Black Arrows were the RAF's premier team. In the early years of the 1960s the "Blue Diamonds" of No. 92 Squadron RAF (also flying Hunters), "The Tigers" of No. 74 Squadron RAF, equipped with the new English Electric Lightning, the "Red Pelicans" flying BAC Jet Provosts, and the "Yellowjacks" flying Folland Gnats formed. The large number of squadron display teams later rationalised to a single unit from the Central Flying School.

== Aircraft used ==
Aeroplane	Number	Period
Hawker Hunter	4	1955–1956
Hawker Hunter	5	1956–1958
Hawker Hunter	9	1958–1960

== List of Leaders ==
- 1956–1958: Roger Topp
- 1958–1960: Peter Latham

== See also ==
- Black Falcons – Royal New Zealand Air Force aerobatic display team
- CF-18 Demonstration Team – Royal Canadian Air Force squad
- Blue Angels – United States Navy's flight demonstration squadron
- Chinook Display Team – RAF helicopter aerobatic team
