= William Harbison =

Royal Air Force Air Vice-Marshal (1922-2018)

William Harbison CB, CBE, AFC
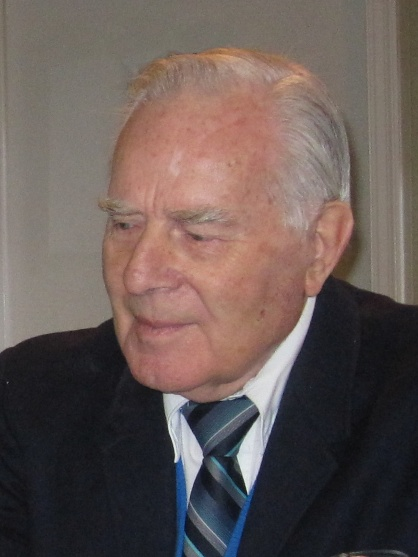
- Paddy Harbison at the Army Navy Country Club in 2011
- Born: 11 April 1922
- Died: 25 December 2018 (aged 96)
- Military career
- Allegiance: United Kingdom
- Branch: Royal Air Force
- Service years: 1941–1977
- Rank: Air Vice Marshal
- Nickname: Paddy
- Service number: 133668
- Commands: No. 11 Group; RAF Leuchars; No. 29 Squadron; No. 67 Squadron
- Conflicts: Second World War; Korean War
- Awards: Companion of the Order of the Bath; Commander of the Order of the British Empire; Air Force Cross; Air Medal (United States)
- Other work: Vice President British Aerospace; Aerospace consultant

Air Vice Marshal William "Paddy" Harbison, CB, CBE, AFC, FBIM (11 April 1922 – 25 December 2018), was a British Royal Air Force (RAF) fighter pilot who served during the Second World War and the Korean War. He held senior command roles in the RAF and was the author of a noted technical report that evaluated the performance and tactics of jet combat during the Korean War.

== Early years ==
William Harbison was born in the Irish Free State (now the Republic of Ireland), but grew up in Northern Ireland and was educated at Ballymena Academy.

== RAF career ==
=== Second World War ===
Harbison joined the Royal Air Force (RAF) in 1941 shortly after the Battle of Britain. He received flight training in Canada and upon graduation joined No. 118 Squadron RAF and remained with them for the duration of the war. While in the European Theatre, Harbison flew the Supermarine Spitfire and North American P-51 Mustang.

On 23 March 1945, Harbison led 118 Squadron on a mission escorting over 100 Avro Lancaster bombers. Shortly before reaching their target in Bremen, Germany, the formation came under attack by twenty Messerschmitt Me 262 fighters. Several members of the squadron, including Harbison, damaged enemy jets, but could not catch them due to their superior speed.

=== Interbellum ===
After the war, he served with No. 64 Squadron RAF flying the twin-engine de Havilland Hornet, the fastest piston-engine fighter ever to enter service. Harbison also served with No. 263 and No. 257 Squadrons flying the Gloster Meteor. In 1948, Harbison participated in an exchange program with the United States Air Force's 1st Fighter Group. He was stationed at March Air Force Base in California where he flew the Lockheed F-80 Shooting Star and became the first serving RAF pilot to fly the North American F-86 Sabre. Harbison returned to England in 1950 where he was assigned to the All-Weather Development Squadron at the Central Fighter Establishment (CFE).

=== Korean War ===
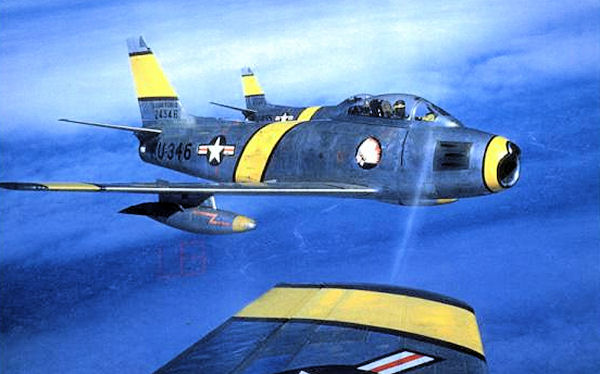
North American F-86F-25-NH Sabres of the 4th FIW/335th FIS "Chiefs" over Korea

To obtain first-hand information on Korean air operations, CFE obtained approval from USAF Chief of Staff, Hoyt Vandenberg, to send four RAF pilots to observe and report. Second World War ace, Wing Commander John Baldwin, Squadron Leader Harbison, and two junior officers were selected for this task. Harbison's specific assignment was with the USAF 4th Fighter Group to evaluate combat tactics used by the F-86 against the Soviet MiG-15. On 13 February 1952, Harbison reported to Colonel Harrison Thyng, commander of the 4th Fighter-Interceptor Wing at Kimpo Air Base, South Korea where he was assigned to the 335th Fighter Squadron. After attending "Clobber College", a program where newly arrived pilots flew training sorties with experienced instructors, Harbison once again found himself flying combat missions. He enjoyed the flying and considered himself lucky for the opportunity to "observe the air war along the Yalu River, arguably the best seat in the house". Harbison was credited with damaging a MiG-15 in combat and was awarded the United States Air Medal. After Baldwin failed to return from a weather reconnaissance mission, responsibility for completing the final report fell to Harbison. Despite the short notice and with little knowledge of the details Baldwin had intended to include, Harbison completed a 152-page report that evaluated the operational characteristics of the F-86 and the tactics used against the MiG-15.

That the F.86 has been able to achieve so marked a superiority over the Mig in air combat is due to the higher quality of the human material manning it, a combination of aggressiveness, sound tactical thinking and the ability of its pilots to fly and fight the F.86 to its maximum limits.

— William Harbison, The F.86 v. the MiG-15

=== Senior command ===
After completing his tour in Korea, Harbison was once again flying the F-86 as commander of No. 67 Squadron of the RAF Second Tactical Air Force at RAF Wildenrath in West Germany. In 1956, he returned home to attend the Army Staff College at Camberley, Surrey. In 1957, Harbison was assigned to air defence operations in the Ministry of Defence and then served a tour as the commanding officer of the all-weather No. 29 Squadron RAF flying Gloster Javelins.

Harbison then attended Joint Services Staff College at Latimer, Buckinghamshire. Following graduation, Harbison served in eastern Scotland as commander of RAF Leuchars, the most northerly air defence station in the United Kingdom. He then attended the Canadian National Defence College in Kingston, Ontario followed by a tour as Group Captain Operations at RAF Fighter Command headquarters. Promoted to air commodore in 1969, Harbison served as the director of operations of the National Air Traffic Services in London. He returned to the United States in 1972 as air attaché at the British Embassy, Washington, D.C.

Harbison was promoted to air vice marshal in January 1975 and shortly thereafter appointed commander of No. 11 Group RAF responsible for the air defence of the United Kingdom. No. 11 Group was the successor to RAF Fighter Command which had defended London and the south-east of England against attacks by the Luftwaffe during the Battle of Britain. At the end of his tour, Harbison retired from the Royal Air Force.

== Later years ==
After retiring from the RAF on 31 March 1977, Harbison joined British Aerospace (BAe) and returned to the United States as vice president of their Government Programs Office in Washington, D.C. He continued working as a consultant for the company after retiring from BAe. Nearly fifty years after its original publication, Harbison's report found new life as a training guide included in the computer game, MiG Alley. Impressed by the mix of technical and tactical analysis that applied just as much to a 1999 flight simulation as to real jet combat in 1952, one reviewer described Harbison's report as, "the best game strategy guide I've ever read." Harbison remained active in the aviation community after his second retirement, attending reunions and speaking at symposiums including:

- The Jet Age: Korea, Vietnam, Cold War — A panel of four war veterans (Gen. Hal Hornburg, Air Vice Marshal Paddy Harbison of the Royal Air Force, Maj. Gen. James McInerny and Lt. Col. Tom Hanton) discuss the challenges and triumphs of air power over the years. The event was held on 14 June 2007 at the Pentagon Conference Center to commemorate the Air Force's 60th anniversary.
- Third No. 118 Squadron Reunion — Members of No. 118 Squadron RAF meet for their 3rd reunion on 8 May 2009 in Coventry.
- 70th Anniversary of V-E Day — Harbison and his wife Helen were among the honorees at the National Air and Space Museum's observance of the 70th anniversary of Victory in Europe Day. Harbison described his success in shooting down the German V-1 flying bomb and shared his pilot logbook that documented his wartime missions including photographs of aircraft and crew.

Harbison was married to Helen née Geneva, a 1947 graduate of Illinois Wesleyan University. The Harbisons raised two sons and lived in the town of Falls Church, Virginia. Harbison died on 25 December 2018, aged 96.

== Honours ==
In 1953, Harbison was awarded the United States' Air Medal for service as a fighter pilot in Korea. In the 1955 Birthday Honours, Harbison was awarded the Air Force Cross while serving as the commander of No. 67 Squadron RAF in Germany. In the 1965 Birthday Honours, he was appointed Commander of the Order of the British Empire (CBE), and in the 1977 New Year Honours, Companion of the Order of the Bath (CB).

== Notes ==
Military offices
Preceded by A N Davis	Station Commander RAF Leuchars; 1963–1965	Succeeded by A S R Strudwick
Preceded by Robert Freer	Air Officer Commanding No. 11 Group; 1975–1977	Succeeded by Donald Hall
