= Peter Latham (RAF officer) =

Royal Air Force Air Vice-Marshal (1925-2016)

- Born: 18 June 1925
- Died: 4 December 2016 (aged 91)
- Military career
- Allegiance: United Kingdom
- Branch: Royal Air Force
- Service years: 1944–1981
- Rank: Air Vice Marshal
- Commands: No. 11 Group (1977–81); Officer and Aircrew Selection Centre (1973–74); RAF Tengah (1969–71); No. 11 Squadron (1958–62)
- Conflicts: Second World War
- Awards: Companion of the Order of the Bath; Air Force Cross; Queen's Commendation for Valuable Service in the Air (2)

Air Vice Marshal Peter Anthony Latham, CB, AFC (18 June 1925 – 4 December 2016) was a senior Royal Air Force officer. From 1977 to 1981, he served as Air Officer Commanding No. 11 Group. Earlier in his career, from 1958 to 1960, he was leader of the Black Arrows (predecessor of the current RAF aerobatic team, the Red Arrows). In 1999, he was made an Honorary President of the Royal International Air Tattoo.

== Honours ==
In the 1954 New Year Honours, Latham was awarded the Queen's Commendation for Valuable Service in the Air. In the 1960 Queen's Birthday Honours, he was awarded the Air Force Cross (AFC). In the 1961 Queen's Birthday Honours, he was awarded the Queen's Commendation for Valuable Service for a second time. In the 1980 New Year Honours, he was appointed a Companion of the Order of the Bath (CB).

Military offices
Preceded by Donald Hall	Air Officer Commanding No. 11 Group; 1977–1981	Succeeded by Peter Harding
