= No. 107 Squadron RAF =

Defunct flying squadron of the Royal Air Force

- Active: 8 Oct 1917 – 30 Jun 1919; 6 Aug 1936 – 4 Oct 1948; 22 Jul 1959 – 10 Jul 1963
- Country: United Kingdom
- Branch: Royal Air Force
- Nickname: Lowestoft's 'own' Squadron
- Mottos: French: Nous y serons ("We shall be there")

Commanders
- Notable commanders: Basil Embry; Ivor Broom

Insignia
- Squadron Badge heraldry: A double-headed eagle displayed gorged with a collar of Fleur de Lys. The double-headed eagle is one of the supporters from the armorial bearings of Salisbury, in which district the squadron was formed. The collar of fleur-de-lys was introduced in reference to service in France in the First World War during a period when the unit was attached to the French Army. The motto is said to have been derived from the squadron magazine produced in the First World War and entitled The Objective ('107' Squadron Always Gets There).
- Squadron Codes: 107 (Aug 1936 – Oct 1938); BZ (Oct 1938 – Sep 1939); OM (Sep 1939 – Oct 1948)

No. 107 Squadron RAF was a Royal Flying Corps bomber unit formed during the First World War. It was reformed in the Royal Air Force during the Second World War and was operational during the Cold War on Thor Intermediate Range Ballistic Missiles.

== History ==
=== Formation and the First World War ===
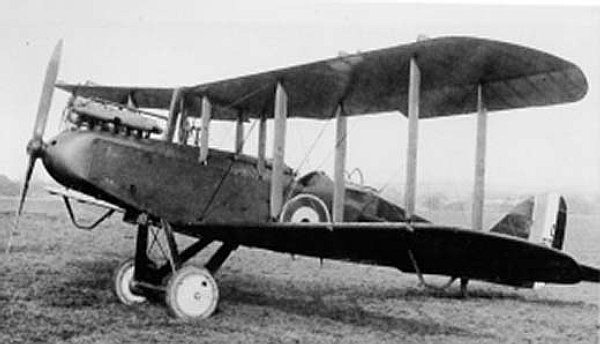
An Airco DH.9 as used by No. 107 Squadron

Though already formed at Catterick as a day bomber unit on 8 October 1917, No. 107 Squadron was not equipped with aircraft until 15 May 1918 at RFC Lake Down, north of Salisbury. The squadron received Airco DH.9s, which it took to the Western Front on 3 June of that year. The squadron became at first part of the 13th wing of the 3rd brigade, working up to operational status. Thereafter it was transferred to the 51st wing of the 9th brigade and it began operations from Drionville. Its main targets were enemy airfields, base areas and communication lines, which it continued to attack until the Armistice. The squadron's most successful raid was made on Saponay on 21 July 1918, where a large ammunition dump was hit. From the squadron's airfield, 20 miles away at Chailly, the reflection of the explosions and fire could be seen going on all the evening and throughout the night. Another notable raid was that made on the Aulnoye railway station and junction on 1 October 1918. Returning to Hounslow Heath Aerodrome in March 1919, it disbanded there on 30 June of that same year.

=== Reformation and the Second World War ===
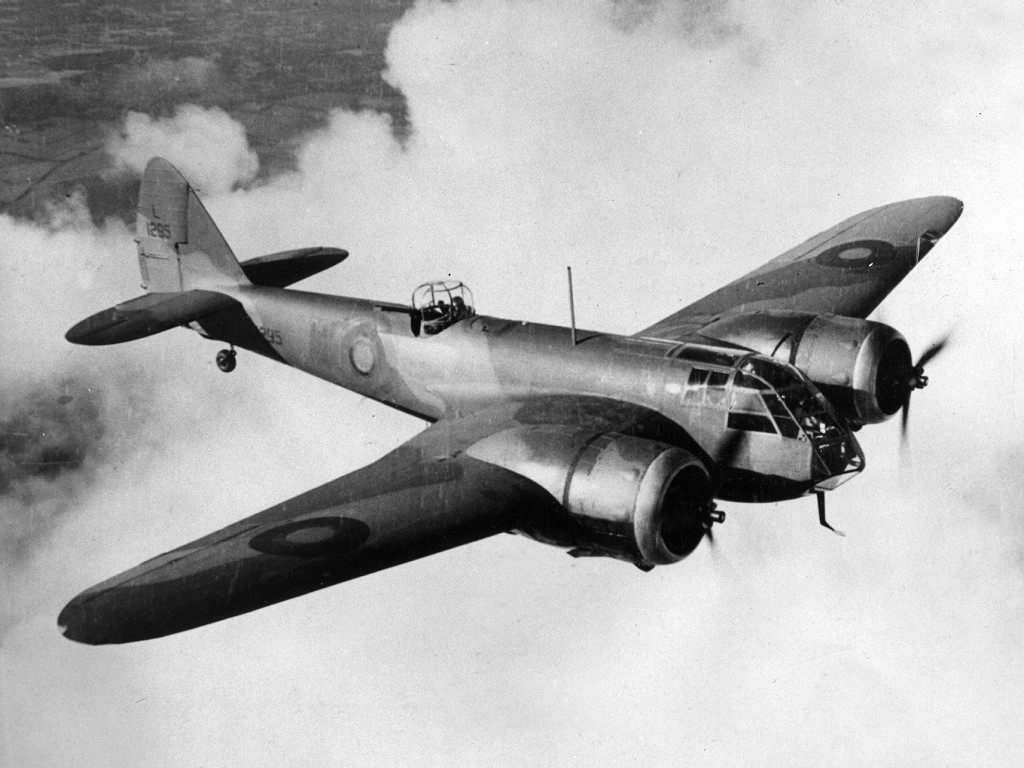
A Bristol Blenheim Mk.I

No. 107 Squadron was reformed at RAF Andover on 10 August 1936 as a light bomber squadron, equipped with Hawker Hinds. These were replaced by Blenheim Mk.Is from August 1938 which gave way in their turn to Blenheim Mk.IVs in May 1939. It was with five of this aircraft that No. 107 took part in the RAF's first bombing raid of the war against enemy ships in the German port of Wilhelmshaven on 4 September 1939, the day after war was declared on Germany, along with No. 110 Squadron. The raid was not a success: of the five aircraft despatched only one returned – and with its bomb load still intact as it had not been able to locate the enemy. One of shoot down Blenheims (N6189), flown by F/O Herbert Lightoller, crashed into cruiser Emden, causing slight damage, killing 11 crewmen and injuring around 30. These were among the first casualties of the German fleet during the war. The first British prisoner of war in World War II was Sergeant George Booth, a navigator with 107 Squadron. He was captured when his Bristol Blenheim was shot down over the German coast on that 4 September 1939. In April 1940 the squadron carried out attacks on German forces engaged in the invasion of Norway and after the invasion of France and the Low Countries in May 1940 began attacking enemy columns and communications. Following the Dunkirk evacuation the squadron became engaged with attacking invasion barges and shipping concentrations in the Channel ports. In one of these attacks the new Commanding Officer, Wing Commander Basil Embry was shot down. He had taken over the squadron shortly after the disastrous first war mission in September 1939 and had taught the squadron the need for a tight formation for mutual defence which served the squadron time and again. The adventurous story of his escape from captivity eventually reached book form.

=== In Coastal Command ===
Between 3 March 1941 and May 1941, the squadron was on loan to RAF Coastal Command and stationed at RAF Leuchars. Its duties while in Coastal Command were various: shipping strikes, convoy duties, coastal patrols, submarine searches and attacks on enemy airfields and harbours. These were quite hazardous as the squadron lost two COs during these operations, Wing Commander Cameron in April and Wing Commander Birch on 4 May 1941.

=== To Malta ===
On return to RAF Bomber Command the squadron took up its low-level daylight raids again until August of that year, when the aircraft of the unit and their pilots -the air detachment of the squadron- were sent to Malta. From there anti-shipping missions were carried out along the Axis' north-south convoy routes, around the Italian coast, Sicily, and along the North African coast. However, after the Italian and German air forces strengthened the air defence of Sicily in December, 1941, and began round-the-clock bombing of the Malta airfields, the air detachment was withdrawn and disbanded at Luqa on 12 January 1942. Losses among the squadron had been so heavy – 90% of all original and replacement crews were killed in action during the Malta operations – that at one time the squadron was commanded by a sergeant, I. G. Broom. It was not the last time this man was in command of an RAF unit, he ended his career as Air Marshal Sir Ivor Broom.

=== Bostons and Mosquitoes ===
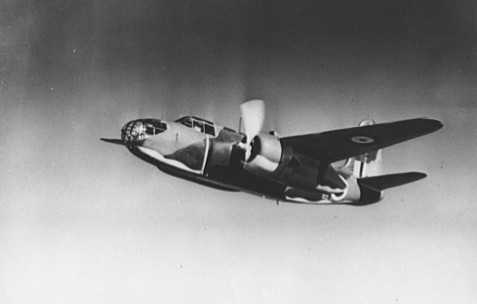
The Douglas Boston

In the meantime the rest of the squadron, forming the ground echelon, had remained at RAF Great Massingham, Norfolk and on 5 January 1942, it received Douglas Boston bombers and new aircrews, and began converting them onto this aircraft. The squadron began flying daylight operations again in March 1942. The most famous operation the squadron flew using the Boston was Operation Oyster, the daylight raid against the Philips works in Eindhoven. The squadron continued to fly the Boston until February 1944, when they converted to the Mosquito Mk.VIs and switched to night intruder operations. In November the squadron moved onto the continent, flying from Cambrai and later from Melsbroek. The squadron continued to fly in the night intruder role to the end of war, when it took up the duty of training in the light bomber role. Remaining in Germany as part of the British Air Forces of Occupation (BAFO) after the war, it was disbanded on 4 October 1948 at Wahn by being renumbered to No. 11 Squadron RAF. (Though some sources claim 15 September 1948.)

=== On Thor missiles ===
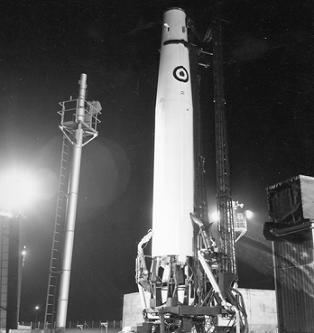
A British Thor missile on the launching pad

When the Thor Intermediate Range Ballistic Missile were employed in the UK each operating missile squadron was originally meant to control three sites. 107 Squadron so started out in September 1958 by being the 'C' flight of the first RAF Thor missile unit, No. 77 Squadron RAF. The flight was stationed at RAF Tuddenham. By June 1959 the flights had reached squadron strength and in September 1959 it was decided that such sites should carry their own identities, 'C' flight of 77 Squadron was thus redesignated No. 107(SM) Squadron RAF, to be effective from 22 July 1959, making No. 107 Squadron one of the twenty RAF squadrons that reached operational status using the Thor missile. However, this new incarnation of No. 107 Squadron did not last long. The upcoming ICBM missiles soon made the Intermediate Range Ballistic Missile obsolete, and in 1962 the Minister of Defence announced the phase-out of the Thor missiles. The squadron therefore disbanded once again, at Tuddenham on 10 July 1963.

== Aircraft operated ==
Aircraft operated by No. 107 Squadron RAF
From	To	Aircraft	Variant
May 1918	Jun 1919	Airco DH.9	
Sep 1936	Sep 1938	Hawker Hind	Mk.I
Aug 1938	May 1939	Bristol Blenheim	Mk.I
May 1939	Jan 1942	Bristol Blenheim	Mk.IV
Jan 1942	Feb 1944	Douglas Boston	Mks.III, IIIa
Feb 1944	Sep 1948	De Havilland Mosquito	Mk.VIb
Jul 1959	Jul 1963	Thor Intermediate Range Ballistic Missile	SM.75

== Commanding officers ==
Officers commanding No. 107 Squadron RAF
From	To	Name
May 1918	September 1918	Major J. R. Howett
September 1918	June 1919	Major H. Gordon Dean
25 September 1936	24 October 1937	F/Lt. Ernest Alton Healy
October 1937	June 1939	S/Ldr. V. Q. Blackden
June 1939	August 1939	S/Ldr. Bear
August 1939	September 1939	W/Cdr. E. F. Haylock
September 1939	May 1940	W/Cdr. B. E. Embry
May 1940	September 1940	W/Cdr. L. R. Stokes
September 1940	January 1941	W/Cdr. J. W. Duggan
January 1941	April 1941	W/Cdr. W. E. Cameron
April 1941	May 1941	W/Cdr. Birch
May 1941	July 1941	W/Cdr. L. V. E. Petley
July 1941	July 1941	W/Cdr. Booth
July 1941	October 1941	W/Cdr. Harte
October 1941	December 1941	Sgt. I. G. Broom (acting)
December 1941	January 1942	W/Cdr. Dunlevie
January 1942	September 1942	W/Cdr. L. H. Lynn
September 1942	December 1942	W/Cdr. P. H. Dutton
December 1942	February 1943	W/Cdr. A. C. P. Carver
February 1943	April 1943	W/Cdr. I. J. Spencer
April 1943	October 1943	W/Cdr. R. G. England
November 1943	July 1944	W/Cdr. M. E. Pollard
July 1944	April 1945	W/Cdr. W. J. Scott
April 1945	July 1946	W/Cdr. W. C. Maher
August 1946	December 1946	W/Cdr. D. P. Hanafin
December 1946	June 1947	W/Cdr. B. Kemp
June 1947	October 1948	W/Cdr. Banning Lover
July 1959	January 1961	S/Ldr. R. P. Flood
January 1961	July 1963	S/Ldr. H. G. Norton

== See also ==
- List of UK Thor missile bases
