= RAF Wattisham =

Royal Air Force base in Suffolk, England (1939–1993)

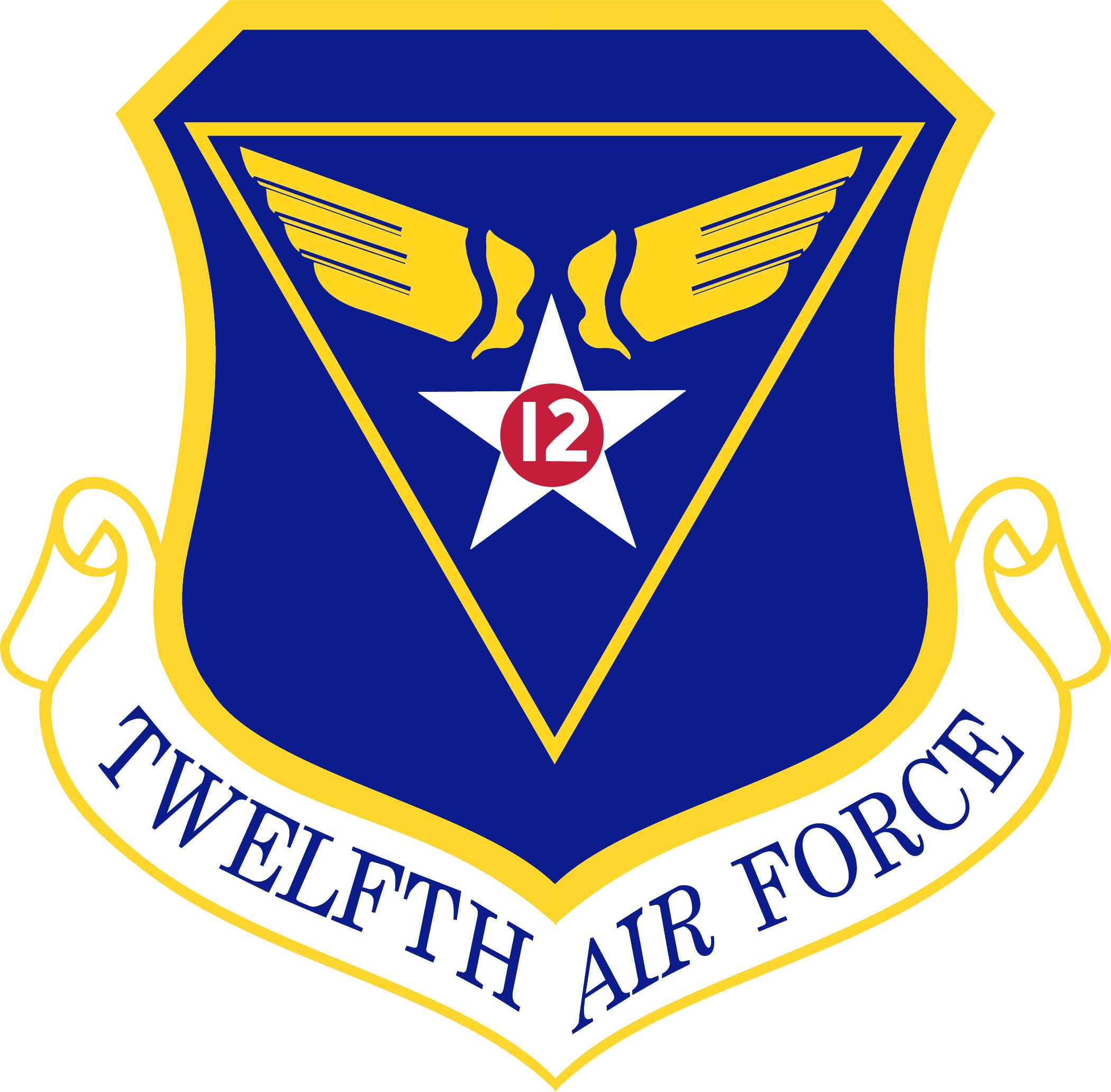
RAF Wattisham
- Wattisham, Suffolk in England
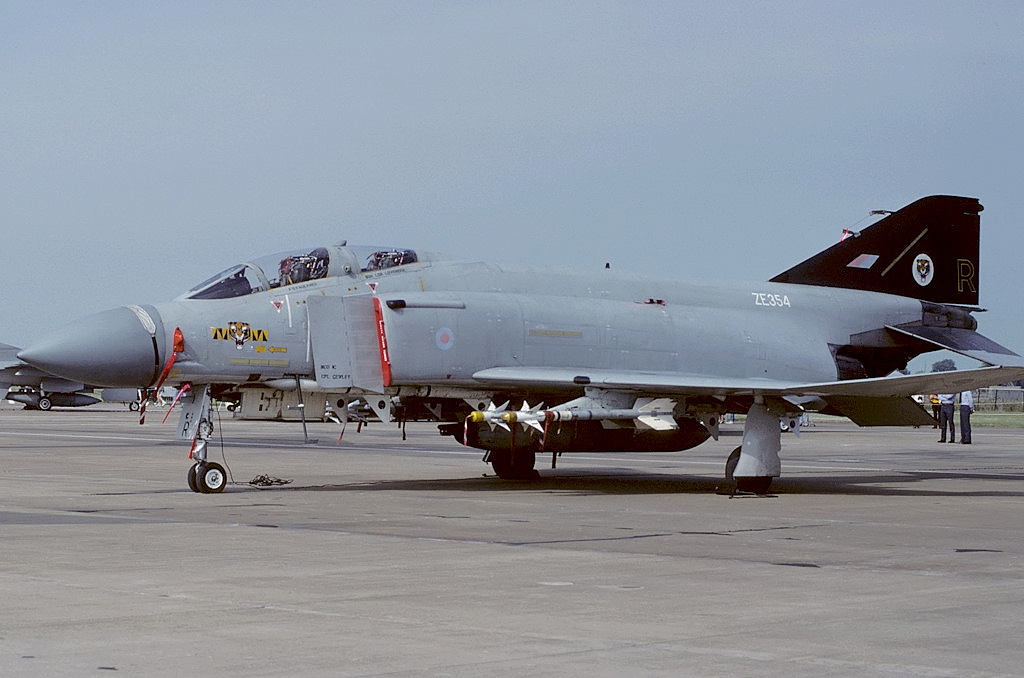
- A McDonnell Douglas F-4J(UK) Phantom of No. 74(Fighter) Squadron which was based at RAF Wattisham.

- Supra mare supra terramque (Latin for 'Above the sea and above the land')

Site information
- Type: Royal Air Force flying station
- Owner: Ministry of Defence
- Operator: Royal Air Force (1939–1942 and 1946–1993); United States Army Air Forces (1942–1946)
- Controlled by: RAF Fighter Command (1946-)
- Condition: Closed

Location
- Location in Suffolk
- Coordinates: 52.128°N 0.956°E
- Grid reference: TM025510
- Area: 409 hectares

Site history
- Built: 1938
- Built by: John Laing & Son Ltd
- In use: 1939–1993
- Fate: Transferred to the British Army's Army Air Corps and became Wattisham Flying Station.

Airfield information
- Identifiers: ICAO: EGUW, WMO: 03590
- Elevation: 89 metres (292 ft) AMSL
Runways
Direction	Length and surface
05/23	2,424 metres (7,953 ft) Asphalt

Royal Air Force Wattisham or more simply RAF Wattisham (ICAO: EGUW) was, between 1939 and 1993, the name of a Royal Air Force station located in East Anglia just outside the village of Wattisham, south of Stowmarket in Suffolk, England. During the Cold War it was a major front-line air force base, operating Quick Reaction Alert (South), before closing as a Royal Air Force station in 1993. Since 1993 it has been operated by the British Army as Wattisham Flying Station.

== History ==
=== Royal Air Force use ===
RAF Wattisham opened on 5 April 1939 as a medium bomber station, the squadrons there being equipped with Bristol Blenheim bombers. Part of No. 2 Group, No. 107 Squadron and No. 110 Squadron were stationed there on the outbreak of war as No. 83 Wing. On 4 September 1939, just 29 hours after the declaration of war, bombers from Wattisham took off on the first attack of the war, against enemy shipping in Wilhelmshaven harbour.

In September 1942, the base was handed over to the United States Army Air Forces (USAAF).

=== United States Army Air Forces use ===
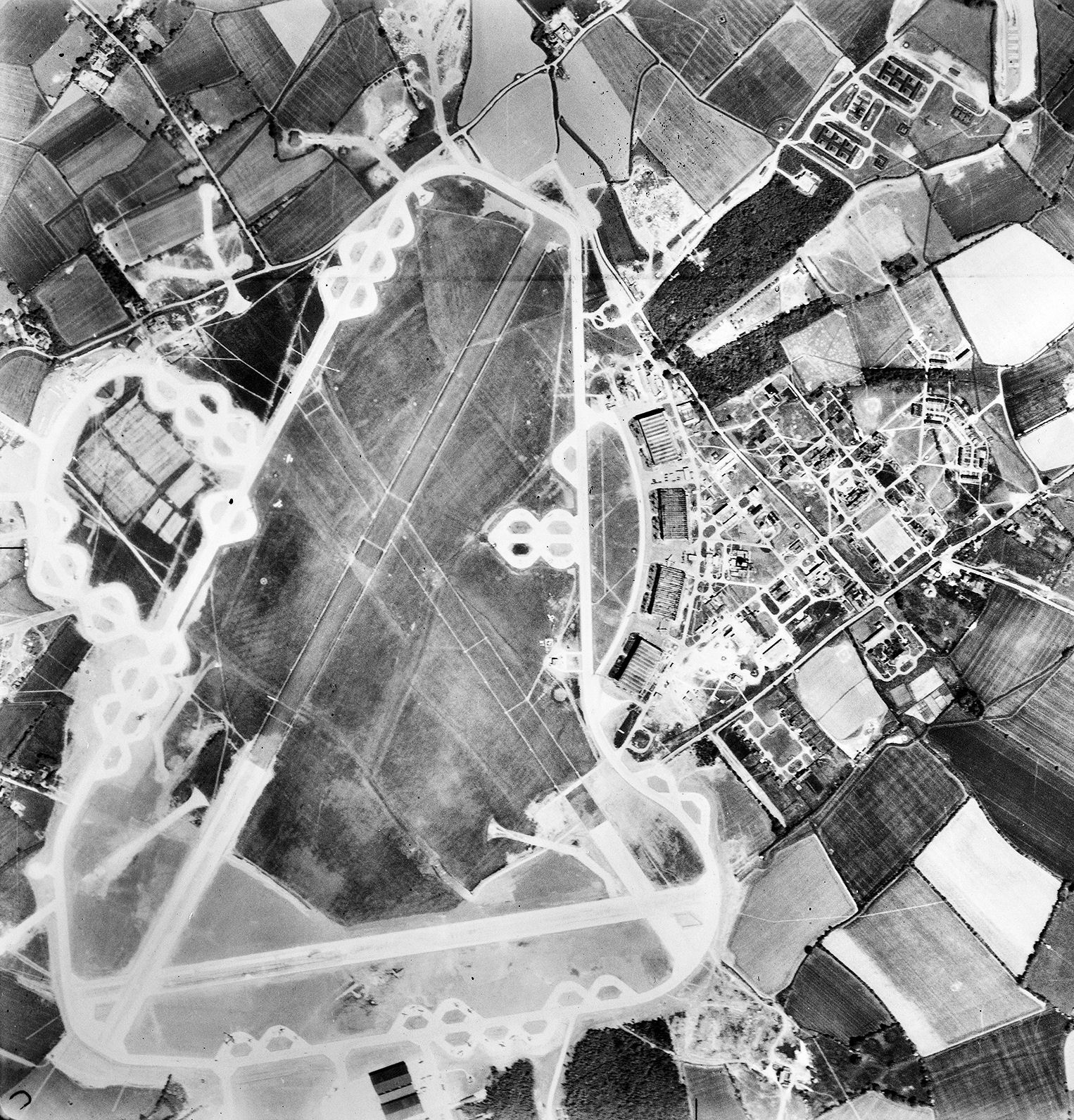
27 May 1944 Aerial photograph of RAF Wattisham the control tower and airfield code are in front of the four C-Type hangars on the right.

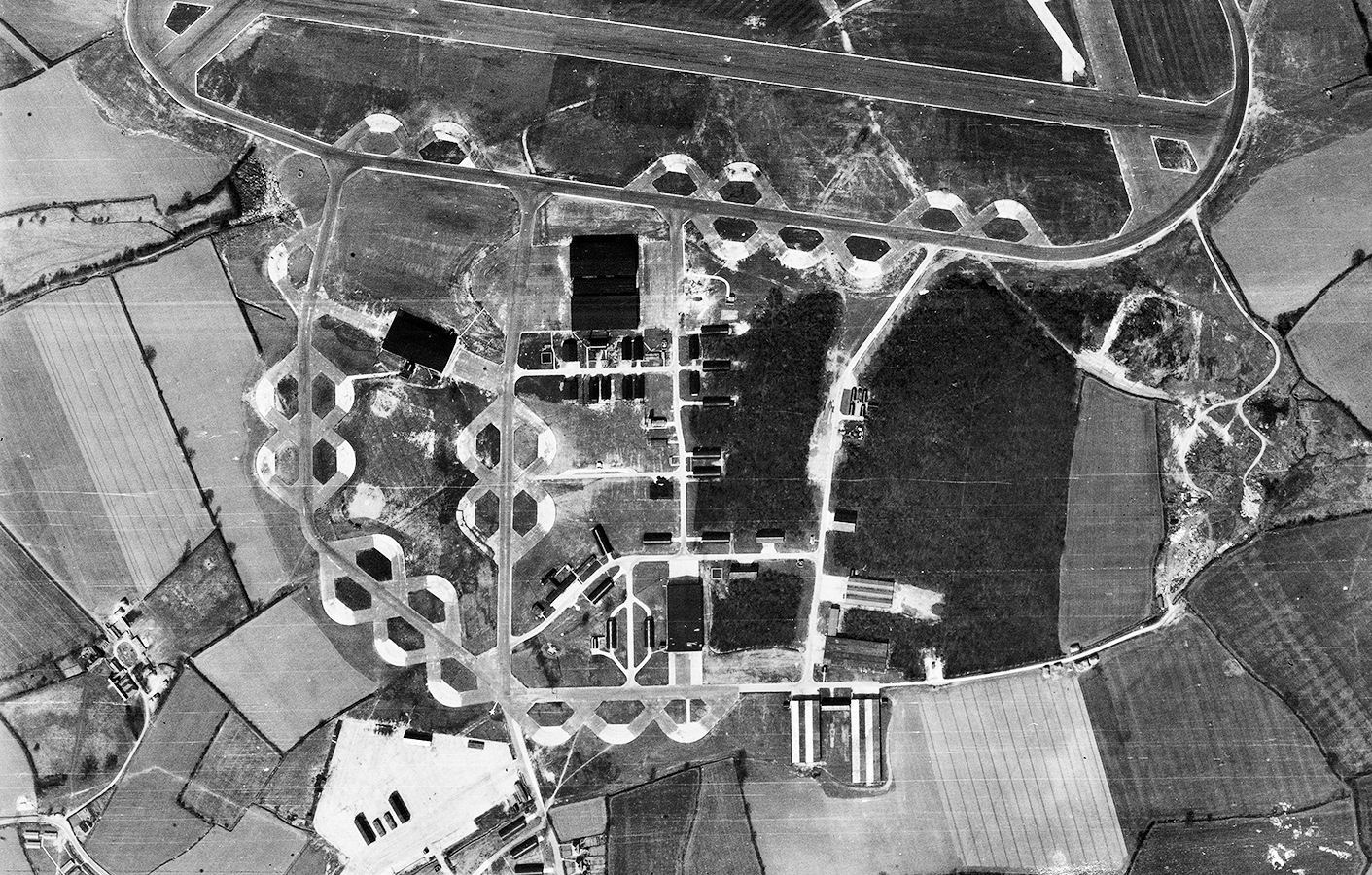
Aerial photograph of the USAAF 4th Strategic Air Depot at RAF Wattisham looking north, 3 April 1946

Wattisham was assigned USAAF designation Station 377 and Station 470, and work began on building concrete runways with the intention of adapting the airfield for heavy bomber use. However, plans were apparently changed when it was evident that there would be sufficient heavy bomber airfields available for the USAAF, and it was decided that Wattisham would remain an air depot and also house a fighter unit.

Work ceased on the runways leaving only the E-W with a concrete surface and short stretches of the other two. The main SW-NE runway was finished off with steel matting while the remaining NW-SE runway continued to be grass-surfaced for most of its length.

==== 68th Observation Group ====
Between October and December 1942 the 68th Observation Group operated the Bell P-39D Airacobra from Wattisham.

==== 4th Strategic Air Depot ====
The 4th Strategic Air Depot (originally the 3rd Advanced Air Depot and then 3rd Technical Air Depot) serviced many types of aircraft but, by late 1943, was concentrating on fighter types. An additional technical area with four T2 hangars, some eighteen hardstands and a taxiway loop joining the airfield perimeter track, were constructed on the south side of the airfield. An engineering complex in temporary buildings was built around this area, chiefly in the village of Nedging Tye.

The 4th Strategic Air Depot installation was officially named Hitcham, which was actually the name of a village two miles to the north-west of the site, to differentiate it from the fighter station using the same airstrip. The base was, by 1944, responsible for the maintenance of all American fighters in the UK.

==== 479th Fighter Group ====
Along with the depot maintenance mission, Wattisham also hosted an Eighth Air Force fighter group, the 479th Fighter Group, arriving from Santa Maria Army Air Field, California, on 15 May 1944. The group was part of the 65th Fighter Wing of the VIII Fighter Command. Aircraft of the group had no cowling colour markings as did other Eighth Air Force fighter groups and were marked only with coloured tail rudders. The initial inventory of the Lockheed P-38 Lightnings, many of which were hand-me-downs from other groups painted in olive drab camouflage, used geometric symbols on the tail to identify squadrons, white for camouflaged aircraft and black for unpainted (natural metal finish) Lightnings.

The group consisted of the following squadrons:

- 434th Fighter Squadron (L2).
- 435th Fighter Squadron (J2).
- 436th Fighter Squadron (9B).

The 479th FG escorted heavy bombers during operations against targets on the continent, strafed targets of opportunity, and flew fighter-bomber, area and counter-air patrol missions. Engaged primarily in escort activities and fighter sweeps until the Normandy invasion in June 1944.

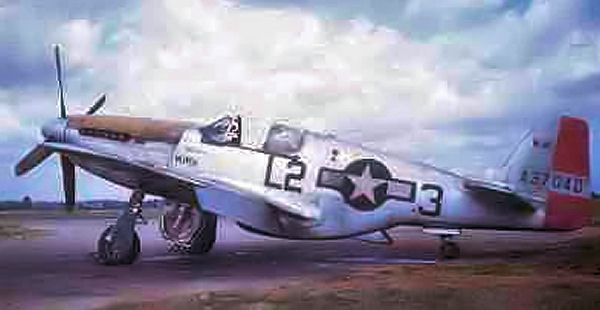
North American P-51B-5 Mustang 42-7040 from the 434th Fighter Squadron in June 1945. This P-51B was previously assigned to the 361st FG at RAF Bottisham and was a replacement for low-hour P-51s reassigned from the group.

The group patrolled the beachhead during the invasion, strafed and dive-bombed troops, bridges, locomotives, railway cars, barges, vehicles, airfields, gun emplacements, flak towers, ammunition dumps, power stations and radar sites while on escort or fighter-bomber missions as the Allies drove across France during the summer and autumn of 1944. The unit flew area patrols to support the breakthrough at Saint-Lô in July and the airborne attack on the Netherlands in September.

The 479th Fighter Group received a Distinguished Unit Citation (DUC) for the destruction of numerous aircraft on airfields in France on 18 August and 5 September and during aerial battle near Münster on 26 September. The unit continued escort and fighter-bomber activities from October to mid-December 1944. It converted to the P-51 Mustang between 10 September and 1 October, using both types on missions until conversion was completed.

The group participated in the Battle of the Bulge (December 1944-January 1945) by escorting bombers to and from targets in the battle area and by strafing transportation targets while on escort duty. From February to April 1945 it continued to fly escort missions, but also provided area patrols to support the airborne attack across the Rhine in March.

The unit returned to Camp Kilmer, New Jersey, in November 1945, and was inactivated in December 1945. Among the notable pilots of the 479th were its second group commander, Col. Hubert Zemke, and an ace, Major Robin Olds.

Legacy The United States Air Force (USAF) 479th Tactical Fighter Wing at George AFB, California, (1952–1971) was bestowed the lineage, honours and history of the World War II USAAF 479th Fighter Group. The 479th TFW deployed personnel and aircraft to Key West NAS, Florida, in response to the 1962 Cuban Missile Crisis and deployed squadrons frequently to Southeast Asia during the Vietnam War. Later, the 479th Tactical Training Wing at Holloman AFB, New Mexico, (1977–1991) provided pilot training.

The 479th Fighter Group at Moody AFB, Georgia, (2000–2007) and since 2009 at NAS Pensacola, Florida, currently as the 479th Flying Training Group.

=== Back to Royal Air Force control ===
==== 1946–1975 ====
In 1946, the base was returned to the Royal Air Force. No. 266 Squadron, with the Gloster Meteor F.3, was stationed there from 4 November to 5 December 1946 and from 4 January to 16 April 1947.

The Air Ministry Servicing Development Unit formed here on 1 January 1947 with a number of aircraft including the Avro York I, Hawker Tempest V, Gloster Meteor F.4 & T.7, Avro Anson T.20 and the de Havilland Vampire F.3. The squadron disbanded on 1 June 1950 at RAF Wittering. In the mid 1950s, the Black Arrows display team 111 squadron operated out of Wattisham, flying Hawker Hunters.

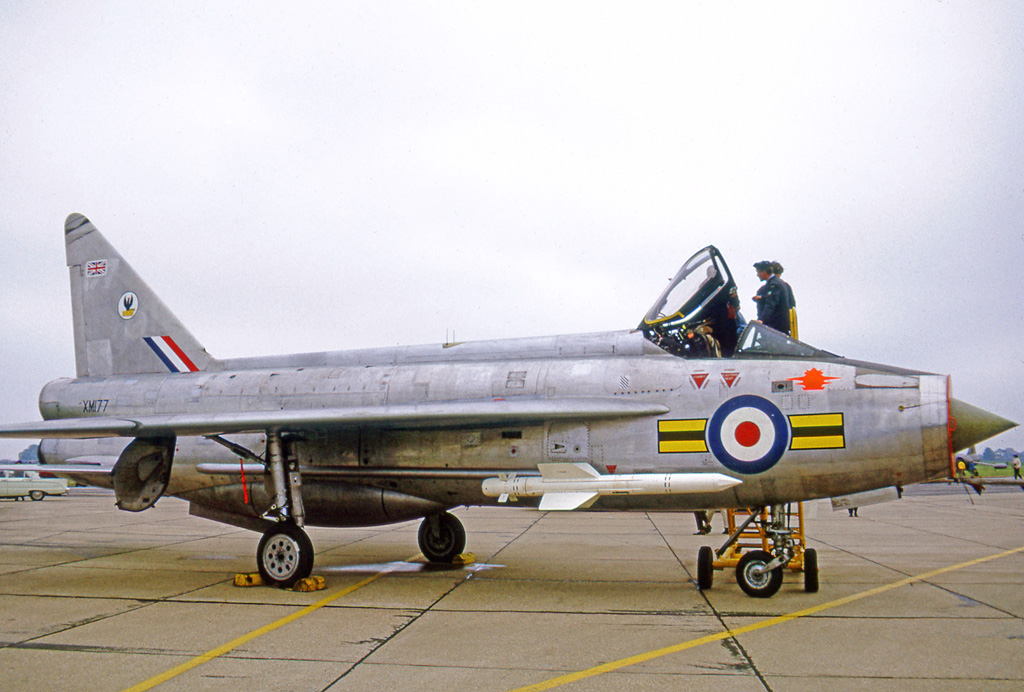
English Electric Lightning F.1A of the Wattisham Target Facilities Flight in 1971.

In 1949, new runways were laid, and the following year No. 152 Squadron arrived with Meteor NF.12 night fighters, In 1954, Hawker Hunters, from No. 257 and 263 Squadrons, the UK's next generation fighter after the Meteor, arrived to secure Wattisham's future as a major fighter station. The Station Commander, Group Captain Edwards, had artificial legs, like Douglas Bader before him. The Wing Commander was one of the four Sowerey brothers, all of whom held senior RAF posts. The Officer Commanding No. 257 Squadron was Major Howard E Tanner, a USAF exchange pilot.

There was also a Station Flight which received and serviced visiting aircraft and also had its own aircraft for various purposes. These included a de Havilland Vampire, a de Havilland Dragon Rapide and a Hunter used by the Station Flight commander.

The Black Arrows aerobatic display team, flying the Hunter, moved to Wattisham from RAF North Weald with air displays becoming a regular feature from 1959.

In the late 1950s the Cold War had begun to intensify and so the RAF began to modernise Britain's air defence. Thus, in 1960, the station was equipped with the very latest in British fighter aircraft: the English Electric Lightning. The capabilities of this aeroplane and Wattisham's location near the East Anglian coast proved invaluable in countering the threats faced from the east. The airfield quickly became a preeminent front-line airbase. Throughout the Cold War RAF Wattisham operated 'QRA' or Quick Reaction Alert Sheds where live armed jets were on standby at all times. The station also functioned as the site of a major 'Blacktop' diversion runway.

==== 1976–1992 ====
On 25 February 1976, 13 McDonnell Douglas Phantom FGR.2s of No. 23(Fighter) Squadron arrived to replace the Lightnings. No. 56(F) Squadron followed on 9 July, arriving with their Phantoms from RAF Coningsby. From Wattisham, the Phantoms continued the role of playing a major part in defending Britain's airspace which largely involved intercepting the Soviet Tupolev Tu-95 Bear aircraft, as part of Quick Reaction Alert (South). Between 4 November and early December 1976, No. 23(F) Squadron deployed to RAF Luqa, Malta, for an Armament Practice Camp (APC). No. 56(F) Squadron deployed for an APC at RAF Luqa between 13 October and November 1977.

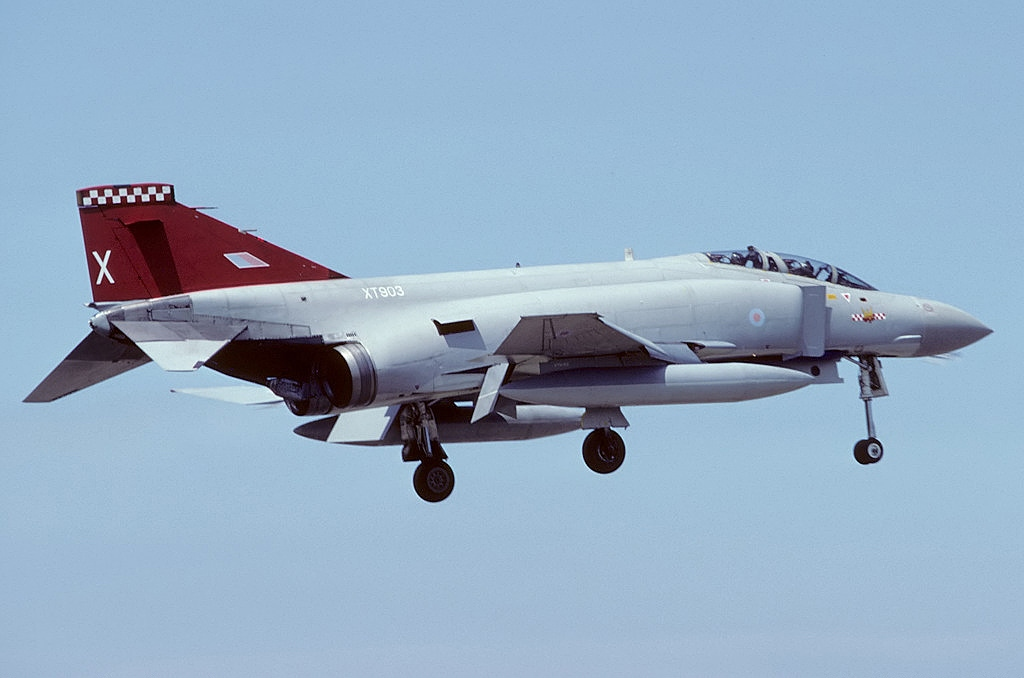
No. 56 (Fighter) Squadron McDonnell Douglas Phantom FGR.2 XT903 at RAF Wattisham, 1992.

On 1 June 1979, Wattisham-based Phantom FGR.2 XV424 from No. 56(F) Squadron was used to re-enact the transatlantic flight of Alcock and Brown, crewed by pilot Squadron Leader A. J. N. "Tony" Alcock and navigator Flight Lieutenant W. N. "Norman" Browne.

Following the Falklands War, it was decided to base Phantoms on the Falklands Islands. In March 1983, No. 23(F) Squadron relocated from RAF Wattisham to Stanley Airport, leaving the Firebirds as the sole based squadron. On 19 October 1984, No. 74(F) Squadron stood-up at RAF Wattisham equipped with the unique McDonnell Douglas F-4J(UK) Phantom. Delivered in three batches, the squadron was brought up to full strength of 15 jets on 5 January 1985.

In 1990, the Options for Change defence review laid out the plan to withdraw the Phantoms from RAF service. In January 1991, the Phantom F-4J(UK) was withdrawn from use, with the Tigers converting over to the Phantom FGR.2. The disbandment of No. 228 OCU on 31 January 1991 at RAF Leuchars, saw the reformation of the Phantom Training Flight as part of No. 74(F) Squadron, operating until 31 December 1991.

No. 56(F) Squadron disbanded on 31 July 1992, reforming as the Panavia Tornado F.3 OCU at RAF Coningsby. No. 74(F) Squadron continued to operate at RAF Wattisham until disbanding on 1 October 1992.

== Closure ==
RAF Wattisham's future hung in the balance as a major air force base and it was decided that with the Cold War threat gone it was no longer needed by the RAF. Wattisham stood down as a fighter base on 31 October 1992. The station was transferred to the control of the British Army in September 1993. The Army Air Corps soon moved in and it rapidly became a major Army airfield, operating it as Wattisham Flying Station. The Royal Air Force returned to operate Westland Sea King Search and Rescue helicopters on the site of the former QRA hangars.

== Former RAF units ==
Squadron	Present	Aircraft	Notes
No. XIII Squadron	July 1941 – 1 August 1942	Bristol Blenheim IV	Detachment from RAF Odiham
No. XVII Squadron	9 September 1939 – 16 December 1939	Hawker Hurricane I	Detachment from RAF Debden
No. 18 Squadron	9 December 1941 – 24 August 1942	Bristol Blenheim IV	Relocated to RAF West Raynham
No. 23(Fighter) Squadron	25 February 1976 – 30 March 1983	McDonnell Douglas Phantom FGR.2	Relocated to Stanley, Falkland Islands
No. XXV Squadron	1 March 1983 – 1 October 1989	Bristol Bloodhound	'C' Flight Detachment from RAF Wyton, disbanded
No. 29(F) Squadron	10 May 1967 – 31 December 1974	English Electric Lightning F.3	Disbanded
No. 34 Squadron	11 February 1949 – 20 July 1949	Supermarine Spitfire LF.16e / Miles Martinet TT.1 / North American Harvard T.2B / Airspeed Oxford T.2 / Bristol Beaufighter TT.10	Detachment from RAF Horsham St. Faith
No. 41(F) Squadron	5 July 1958 – 31 December 1963	Gloster Javelin FAW.4/FAW.5/FAW.8	Disbanded
No. 56(F) Squadron	10 July 1958 – 11 May 1967	Hawker Hunter F.5/F.6 (1958–1961) English Electric Lightning F.1A/F.3 (1960–1967)	Relocated to RAF Akrotiri, Cyprus
No. 56(F) Squadron	21 January 1975 – 29 June 1976	English Electric Lightning F.3/F.6	Briefly relocated to RAF Coningsby to convert to the Phantom FGR.2
No. 56(F) Squadron	9 July 1976 – 31 July 1992	McDonnell Douglas Phantom FGR.2	Transferred to RAF Coningsby to form the Tornado F.3 Operational Conversion Unit
No. 74(F) Squadron	19 October 1984 – 1 October 1992	McDonnell Douglas Phantom F-4J(UK) (1984–1991) Phantom FGR.2 (1991–1992)	Disbanded (Included a Phantom Training Flight between 1 February 1991 and 31 December 1991)
No. 85 Squadron	1 October 1989 – 1 July 1991	Bristol Bloodhound	'E' Flight Detachment from RAF West Raynham, disbanded
No. 86 Squadron	3 March 1941 – 15 May 1941	Bristol Blenheim IV	Relocated to RAF North Coates
No. 107 Squadron	11 May 1939 – 3 March 1941	Bristol Blenheim I/IV	Relocated to RAF Leuchars
No. 110 (Hyderabad) Squadron	11 May 1939 – 17 March 1942	Bristol Blenheim IV	Relocated to RAF Drigh Road
No. 111(F) Squadron	18 June 1958 – 30 September 1974	Hawker Hunter F.5/F.6 (1958–1961) English Electric Lightning F.1A/F.3 (1960–1974)	Disbanded
No. 114 (Hong Kong) Squadron	31 May 1940 – 10 June 1940	Bristol Blenheim IV	Relocated to RAF Horsham St. Faith
No. 152 Squadron	30 June 1954 – 18 June 1956	Gloster Meteor NF.12/NF.14	Relocated to RAF Stradishall
No. 226 Squadron	27 May 1941 – 9 December 1941	Fairey Battle (May 1941) Bristol Blenheim IV (May–November 1941) Douglas Boston III (November–December 1941)	Relocated to RAF Swanton Morley
No. 236 Squadron	9 February 1942 – 3 July 1942	Bristol Beaufighter Ic	Relocated to RAF Oulton
No. 257 Squadron	27 October 1950 – 10 June 1956	Gloster Meteor F.8	Relocated to RAF Wymeswold
No. 257 Squadron	15 January 1957 – 31 March 1957	Hawker Hunter F.2	Disbanded
No. 263 Squadron	22 November 1950 – 10 June 1956	Gloster Meteor F.8 (1950–1955) Hawker Hunter F.2/F.5 (1955–1956)	Relocated to RAF Wymeswold
No. 263 Squadron	15 January 1957 – 31 March 1957	Hawker Hunter F.6	Relocated to RAF Stradishall
No. 266 Squadron	4 November 1946 – 5 December 1946	Gloster Meteor F.3	Relocated to RAF Boxted
No. 266 Squadron	4 January 1947 – 16 April 1947	Gloster Meteor F.3	Relocated to RAF Tangmere
No. 504 Squadron	9 October 1939 – 24 December 1939	Hawker Hurricane Mk.I	Detachment from RAF Debden
No. 695 Squadron	7 May 1947 – 11 February 1949	Supermarine Spitfire LF.16e / Miles Martinet TT.1 / North American Harvard T.2B / Airspeed Oxford T.2 / Bristol Beaufighter TT.10	Detachment from RAF Horsham St. Faith, disbanded
No. 8 Blind Approach Training Flight	18 January 1941 – 15 February 1941	Bristol Blenheim Mk.I	Relocated to RAF Horsham St. Faith
No. 17 Blind Approach Training Flight	October 1941	Airspeed Oxford Mk.I	Relocated to RAF Ipswich
No. 1517 Beam Approach Training Flight	October 1941 – 4 November 1941		
No. 1517 Beam Approach Training Flight	19 May 1942 – 14 November 1942		
Fighter Command School of Technical Training	July 1947 – September 1949		

== See also ==
- List of former Royal Air Force stations
- Wattisham Flying Station
