= 2001 Biggin Hill Airshow crashes =

Aviation accidents in Bromley, England

- Immediate aftermath of the Kingcobra aircraft crash on June 3, 2001.

Disasters
- Date: June 2, 2001 (Venom/Vampire); June 3, 2001 (Kingcobra)
- Summary: Individual accidents
- Site: London Biggin Hill Airport, Bromley, England.; 51°19′51″N 0°1′57″E
- Total fatalities: 3

First aircraft
- Type: de Havilland Venom-FB.50
- Operator: de Havilland Flying Group
- Registration: G-GONE
- Crew: Clive Rustin (survived)

Second aircraft
- Type: de Havilland DH.115 Vampire T Mk 55
- Operator: de Havilland Flying Group
- Registration: G-DHAV (XH308 and U-1234)
- Crew: Kenneth Hayr (killed); Jonathan Kerr (killed)

Third aircraft
- Type: Bell P-63A-7BE Kingcobra
- Operator: Patina Ltd
- Registration: G-BTWR (42-69097 and N52113)
- Crew: Guy Bancroft-Wilson (killed)

Two aviation crashes occurred on June 2–3, 2001, during the annual Biggin Hill Airshow, (Note: The Biggin Hill Airshow is also known by its other alias 'Biggin Hill International Air Fair'. News outlets reporting on the disaster either used 'Airshow' or 'Air Show' rather than the full 'International Air Fair'.) at London Biggin Hill Airport in Bromley, England. An aircraft landing incident and two separate fatal aircraft crashes occurred during the weekend show. A de Havilland Venom suffered minor damage to its fuselage when it landed with its landing gear retracted. Six hours later, a de Havilland DH-115 Vampire was attempting a wingover, when the aircraft lost control and dived into the ground, destroying the Vampire and killing pilots Kenneth Hayr and Jonathan Kerr. A Bell P-63 Kingcobra crashed the following day after attempting a maneuver with insufficient speed, destroying the aircraft and killing pilot Guy Bancroft-Wilson.

After the conclusion of the airshow, the Air Accidents Investigation Branch opened three investigations into the events of June 2–3 for the Venom, Vampire and Kingcobra respectively. Their findings on how wake turbulence affects aircraft during air displays and how communication issues could be improved between performing aircraft and air traffic control were published in their individual reports. The residents of Biggin Hill agreed that the weekend had been a terrible tragedy and were divided over whether the airshow should continue. Despite the concern, the airshow continued to run annually until 2011, at which time it was replaced by an open house air day.

== Background ==
=== Biggin Hill Airshow ===
The Biggin Hill Airshow, then known simply as the Air Fair, was established in 1963 by World War II Royal Air Force pilot Jock Maitland. These displays took place at Biggin Hill Airport annually for the public to view, with the 25th anniversary held in 1987, by which time the air show had become renowned for having high standards for entertainment and well regarded commentators. Early Air Fairs included air displays with the T-28D Trojan in 1978 and the English Electric Lightning in 1980.

=== de Havilland DH-115 Vampire ===
==== Aircraft ====
The DH115 Vampire T11 used in the June 2 display was originally built in 1955 by de Havilland Aircraft Company Ltd and entered the Royal Air Force in 1956 under the registration of XH308. It remained in service until 1962, after which the aircraft was put into storage, sold to the Swiss Air Force and was then upgraded to Mk 55. The Vampire operated as U-1234 through 1991, finally being returned to the United Kingdom in 1995.

==== Crew ====
Piloting the Vampire was Sir Kenneth Hayr (66), a New Zealand born former fighter pilot and retired air marshal in the Royal Air Force. He had been a Cadet Warrant Officer in the No 3 (City of Auckland) Squadron, Air Training Corps. He eventually went on to join the Royal Air Force in the 1950s, rising to senior rank and later serving as the Inspector of RAF Flight Safety in 1976. Hayr was responsible for overseeing the RAF's role in the re-capture of the Falkland Islands. On the day of the display Hayr, with a total of 4,398 flying hours (185 of those with the Vampire), would be pilot-in-command, sitting in the left seat of the Vampire. Accompanying him was Jonathan Kerr (33), a safety pilot who had been allocated to the Vampire by the Civil Aviation Authority due to the circumstances following the incident with the Venom that morning.

=== Bell P-63 Kingcobra ===
==== Aircraft ====
The Bell P-63 Kingcobra used in the display of June 3 was assembled in 1944, at the end of the Second World War. The aircraft was stationed with the United States Air Force under serial number 42-69097. It was built to conventional standard as a single seat aircraft. After completing its service in the US Air Force, the Kingcobra was sold under new civil registration N52113 in 1947, beginning its career as an air racer craft. It remained as a racer for the next four decades, changing hands multiple times but keeping the same registration (N52113), before finally being sold to Patina Ltd in Jersey with civil registration G-BTWR in 1991. At this time the Kingcobra was completely rebuilt, with a new zero-timed 1,325-horsepower (988 kW) liquid-cooled Allison V1710-117 piston engine located behind the pilot, gearbox and propeller.

==== Crew ====
Red Arrows pilot and British Airways captain Guy Bancroft-Wilson (43) was flying the Kingcobra on the day of its display, having begun flight training whilst serving. Bancroft-Wilson finished a three year tour as part of the Red Arrows, flying Hawk aircraft, continuing to fly professionally thereafter. Despite only having 13 hours of flying experience with the Kingcobra, Bancroft-Wilson had accumulated 7,730 hours of flying time overall. He also held a display authorisation for a Cat C aircraft (the Kingcobra being of this category). This requires the pilot perform a minimum of three display sequence practices in an aircraft of the same category, not preceding 90 days before the day of the public display. Bancroft-Wilson had flown 30 minutes of dual instruction in a Texan Harvard, 25 minutes of display exercise in the Kingcobra two days before the airshow display and the display itself on June 2. These were not recorded in his pilot logbook however, instead being recorded as completed by Patina Ltd.

== June 2: Venom incident and Vampire crash ==
June 2 Venom incident
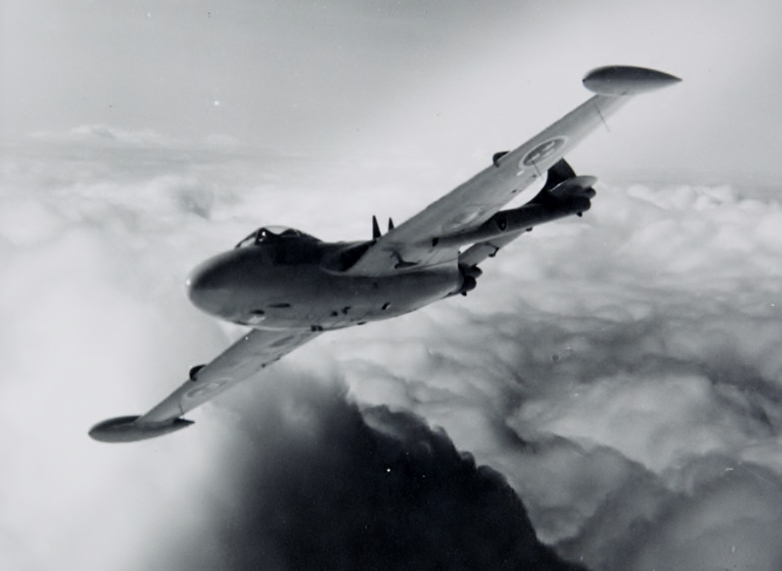
- A de Havilland Venom similar to the one involved.

Accident
- Date: June 2, 2001
- Summary: Landed with landing gear retracted due to mechanical failure
- Site: London Biggin Hill Airport, Bromley, England.

Aircraft
- Aircraft type: de Havilland Venom-FB.50
- Operator: de Havilland Flying Group
- Registration: G-GONE
- Flight origin: Biggin Hill Airport, Bromley, England
- Destination: Biggin Hill Airport, Bromley, England
- Occupants: 1
- Crew: 1
- Fatalities: 0
- Survivors: 1

=== Venom incident ===
==== Aircraft problems and belly landing ====
On the morning of 2 June 2001, a de Havilland Sea Vixen, a de Havilland Vampire and a de Havilland Venom were scheduled to fly in formation from Bournemouth to take part in an airshow at Biggin Hill Airport. The Venom, being a single-seater aircraft, was flown by company chief pilot Clive Rustin. Rustin had over 200 hours of flying experience with the Venom, however this was only his second flight in eight years and with the aircraft to date. On the previous day, Rustin had noted that there was an issue with the landing gear indicator. The Vampire and Sea Vixen landed without issue at Biggin Hill. However, the Venom had issues with its landing gear indicator showing the flap as being over the one-third setting, despite being set to one-third during the pre-landing checks. Rustin corrected the flap setting. Entering final approach, he lowered the flap to full and maintained an even spacing between the Vampire and Sea Vixen, avoiding their slipstreams, as the gap had decreased to an unsafe amount. Certain the landing gear was all the way down and calling 'finals three greens' to the tower, despite the questionable indicator, Rustin landed the Venom in what he believed was a normal landing. The Venom had in fact completed a smooth touchdown on its belly, with Air Traffic Control reporting the landing gear had not been down. This was further proven by the nose vibration experienced in the latter stages of the landing run. Whilst Rustin was uninjured, the aircraft experienced crushed drop tanks and a scratched fuselage on its underside. This damage resulted in it being unable to perform any displays at the airshow.

==== Subsequent observations and aftermath ====
Clive Rustin later pinpointed three contributing factors to his failure to lower the landing gear. These included the width between the landing gear and the flaps being close together and of a similar design, leading him to believe he had lowered the flap and not the landing gear, despite the reverse being true. This led to him failing to associate the excess flap with an unlowered landing gear. This was not helped by the landing gear indicator not reporting correctly. Secondly, the location of the indicator in the cockpit and the intensity of the lights made the position of the landing gear difficult to discern. Finally, Rustin reckoned he was distracted by the concentration required to perform a landing in close proximity to the other aircraft.

After the incident with the Venom, runway 03 at Biggin Hill was closed for approximately three hours in preparation for the air displays taking place later that day. The Vampire's pilot-in-command Sir Kenneth Hayr assisted with the aftermath of the incident with the Venom and was in attendance at the airshow briefing. Due to the Venom being unable to partake in any displays after the damage it had taken from the landing, the Vampire and Sea Vixen would pair up for a short sequence display followed by shorter solo displays later that day. The airshow instead opened with a helicopter display from the Blue Eagles which could perform without needing the full runway. This performance included the UK's first female military display pilot Sergeant Julie Wiles. This performance was followed by many other displays and flybys, including the Red Arrows which flew in from another airport. The Civil Aviation Authority assigned safety pilot Jonathan Kerr to the Vampire due to the events of the morning and potential visibility issues involving the aircraft's cockpit.

June 2 Vampire crash
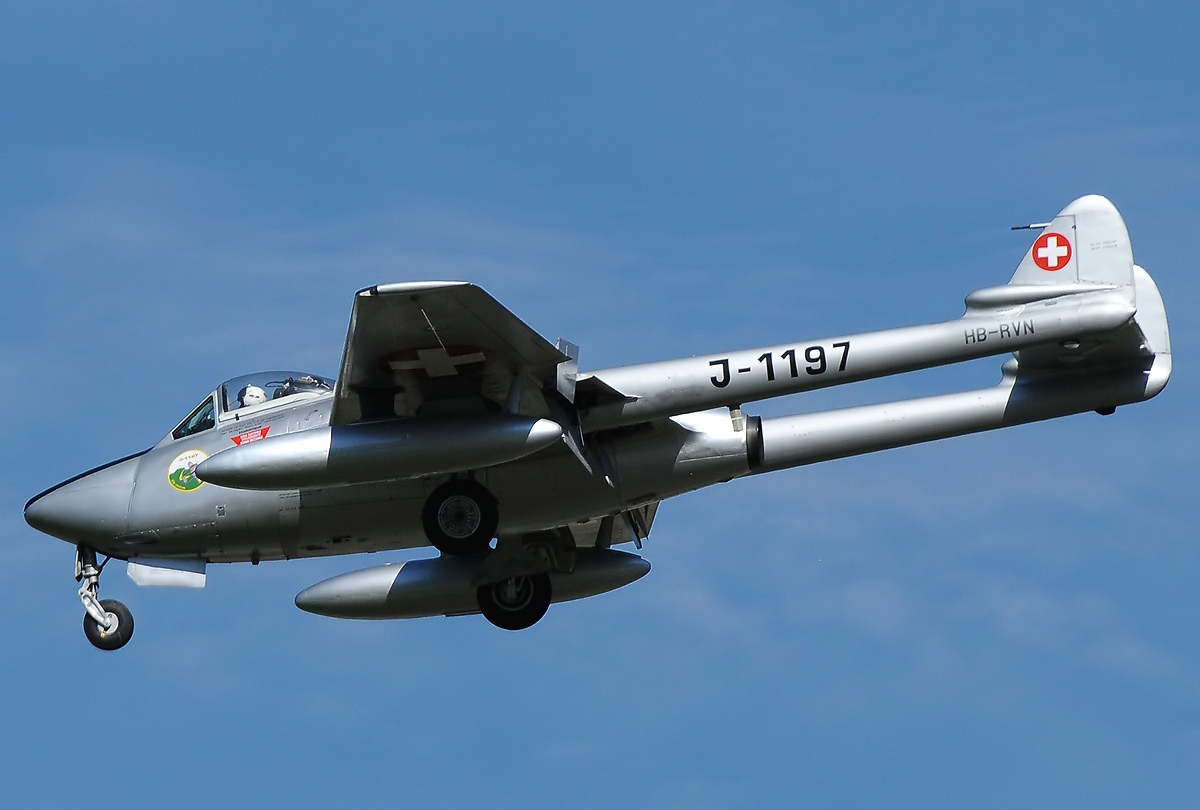
- A de Havilland Vampire similar to the one involved.

Accident
- Date: June 2, 2001
- Summary: Loss of control due to wake turbulence from another aircraft
- Site: London Biggin Hill Airport, Bromley, England

Aircraft
- Aircraft type: de Havilland DH.115 Vampire T Mk 55
- Operator: de Havilland Flying Group
- Registration: G-DHAV (XH308 and U-1234)
- Flight origin: Biggin Hill Airport, Bromley, England
- Destination: Biggin Hill Airport, Bromley, England
- Occupants: 2
- Crew: 2
- Fatalities: 2
- Survivors: 0

=== Vampire crash ===
==== Vampire and Sea Vixen air display plan ====
Pilots Hayr and Kerr discussed plans for the display that would now take place without the Venom. The Vampire and Sea Vixen would take off separately several minutes before the planned display time, joining up as a formation pair behind the crowd. They would then run-in along runway 03, in front of the crowd, with the Vampire following in right echelon formation. During a level turn to the left, the Vampire would switch to the line astern position. They would proceed outbound from the crowd with a 345° heading. Upon reaching the end of the display line, the Sea Vixen would perform a wingover to the right, reversing direction and returning along the display axis. The Vampire would then mimic this but with a delayed initiation, with the aim to set 1 km (1,100 yd) of spacing from the Sea Vixen, allowing the latter to exit behind the crowd and leave the airspace clear for itself to begin performing solo. The Vampire would then depart for RAF Lyneham, where it would perform a final display.

The planned display maneuvers went ahead; however, the Vampire took off thirty seconds after the Sea Vixen due to a transient issue involving its landing gear. The weather at their departure time gave a northerly surface wind reading of 14 knots, visibility to 20 km (12 mi) with cloud scattered at 3,000 feet, a temp of 13 °C (55 °F) with an air pressure of 1,016 mb. Both Hayr and Kerr had flown in a similar air display sequence one week prior at Duxford; however, that display included the Venom.

==== Vampire crash and immediate aftermath ====
The Vampire and Sea Vixen joined as a pair as planned, flying past the crowd and carrying out their 405° level turn. The Sea Vixen subsequently performed its wingover to the right at a speed of 220 knots (410 km/h) at the apex, subsequently increasing thrust and pulling 2.5 g into the turn. The Vampire then flew to the left astern position, flying a wider radius followed by a right wingover to achieve the planned 1 km of spacing between both aircraft. As the Vampire reached 80° to enter its wingover, it continued to roll to the right, suddenly becoming inverted with the nose dropping down into a steepening descent. The Vampire almost simultaneously rolled upright, raised its nose and increased its angle of attack. Still rolling to the right, the Vampire crashed into woods by the end of runway 21, with a cloud of fire rising into the sky seconds after. These events were reportedly witnessed by 35,000 people in the airshow's crowd. Neither Sir Kenneth Hayr nor Jonathan Kerr survived.

The Sea Vixen cut its display short and dumped its remaining fuel before landing back on runway 03 without issue. Several recordings of the display were taken by camera from members of the crowd. Most of these however, focused solely on the Sea Vixen rather than the Vampire at the time of the latters right wingover. Footage from the last moments of the accident were only available on one recording. This recording would be further analysed in the subsequent investigation.

== June 3: Kingcobra crash ==
June 3 Kingcobra crash
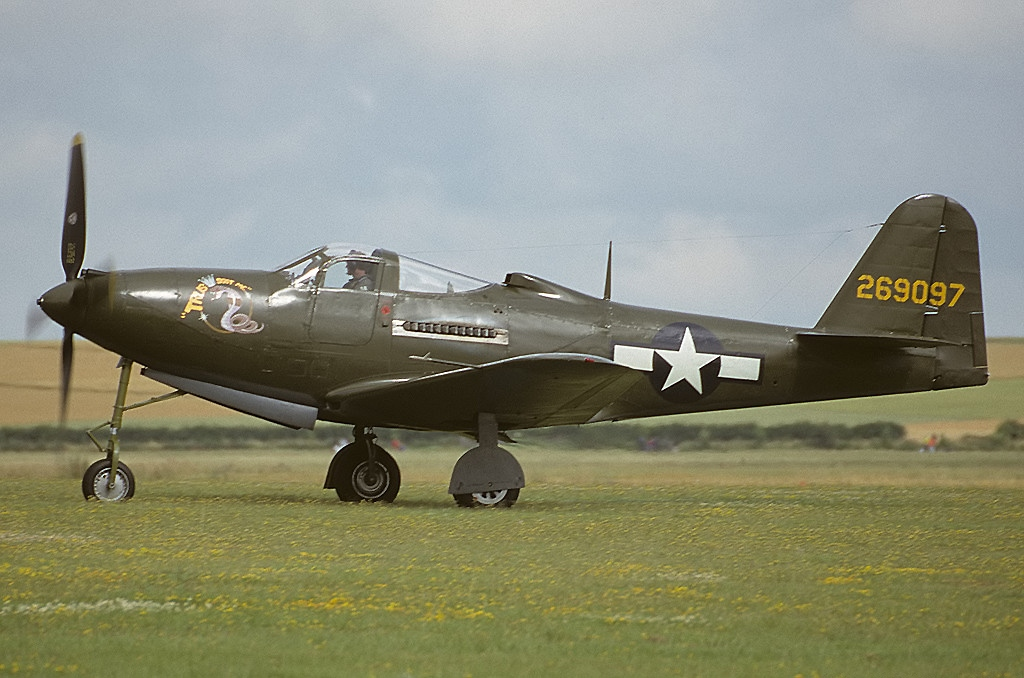
- G-BTWR, the airplane involved in the crash.

Accident
- Date: June 3, 2001
- Summary: Insufficient speed in attempted loop maneuver leading to loss of control
- Site: London Biggin Hill Airport, Bromley, England

Aircraft
- Aircraft type: Bell P-63A-7BE Kingcobra
- Operator: Patina Ltd
- Registration: G-BTWR (42-69097 and N52113)
- Flight origin: Biggin Hill Airport, Bromley, England
- Destination: Biggin Hill Airport, Bromley, England
- Occupants: 1
- Crew: 1
- Fatalities: 1
- Survivors: 0

=== Kingcobra crash ===
==== Warbird trio and initial loss of control ====
In the mid afternoon on the second day of the Biggin Hill Airshow, three World War II warbirds including a Bell P-63 Kingcobra being piloted by Guy Bancroft-Wilson were set to perform in a joint display. They would fly together whilst performing maneuvers. The Kingcobra being the third aircraft would then break away, the first two warbirds would then carry out a pre-planned air display as a pair. The Kingcobra would fill in between the two other aircraft with its own non pre-planned sequence.

The three warbirds took off from runway 03, holding for three minutes to the western side of Biggin Hill Airport before beginning their air display. They then flew in as a trio to a crowd of 50,000 people, each performing a loop maneuver followed by a half cuban eight, after which the Kingcobra split off as planned. A minute later, following a flypast beside the display line at a speed of 220 knots (410 km/h), passing the other two warbirds, the Kingcobra pulled up into a climbing maneuver. During the peak, the Kingcobra was partially inverted and temporarily lost control, entering an incipient spin, however the pilot quickly recovered, though with much altitude lost. Nonetheless, the air display proceeded.

==== Kingcobra crash and aftermath ====
Next, Bancroft-Wilson piloted the Kingcobra past the crowd left to right, performed a wingover to the left, returning past the crowd the other way at 190 knots (350 km/h). The warbird then went out of sight for twenty seconds before it was directed to make a right-hand turn to bearing 220°. It then flew in the direction of the crowd and then pulled up into a loop maneuver, topping out inverted, full nose-up elevator was maintained with right rudder application. The aircraft moved to the right and fell into another incipient spin. The nose turned toward the ground with the rudder returning to neutral, full nose-up elevator staying the same. Unable to recover the dive, the Kingcobra crashed into the ground nearby with a nose down attitude at a speed of 160 knots (300 km/h). The ensuing fire destroyed the aircraft; this was quickly put out by the airport's fire service. Pilot Guy Bancroft-Wilson did not survive. Similarly to the Vampire crash on the day prior, video recordings and photographs were made available to the subsequent investigation.

== Investigations ==
The Air Accidents Investigation Branch of the UK Department for Transport opened two investigations following the events of July 2–3, 2001 for both the Vampire and Kingcobra accidents respectively. The incident involving the Venom FB.50 was described in its own short report and in further detail within the Vampire report.

=== Vampire wreckage ===
There were no indicators of pilot ejection upon examining of the wreckage, the same was true for mechanical failures of which all were within flying control. The Vampire impacted a field of tall grass beyond Biggin Hill Airport's perimeter, approximately 850 metres (2,800 ft) to the north of the end of runway 03/21. Having been completely destroyed from the impact, some sections of the aircraft were farther than 130 metres (430 ft) from the impact location. Ground scars and wreckage distribution showed the Vampire had been travelling at an angle of 130°M, 45° nose down, banked steeply to the right. Other parts of the Vampire wreckage that were investigated also demonstrated that the point of failure was likely not from pilot error or mechanical failure but instead from other less obvious factors.

=== Wake turbulence investigations ===
Having been in a paired display, it was clear that the size difference between the Vampire and the Sea Vixen could have been a catalyst in the loss of control the Vampire experienced in the seconds before its crash. The operating weights of both aircraft were measured through a modelling system, with the Sea Vixen having a mass of 14,784 kg (32,593 lb) and the Vampire having a far lesser mass of 4,400 kg (9,700 lb) (aircraft velocity and placement were also modelled). Both aircraft were also separated in a non-standard way during their air display. This meant the trailing wingtip vortices (the main component of wake turbulence) generated from the Sea Vixen amid flight were at full intensity two to four wing lengths behind, exactly where the Vampire was flying.

In light of this information, the AAIB authorised an aerodynamic study, drawing data from an older study completed in 1954 by the Armament Department of the Royal Aircraft Establishment. The 1954 study performed tests to determine the effect on a smaller tracking aircraft of generated vortices from a larger target aircraft. These tests were originally completed with a Gloster Meteor Mk 4, a slightly heavier aircraft than the Vampire at 6,900 kg (15,200 lb). Three components from the 1954 study included the jet efflux, the rest of the wake and the trailing wing vortices. The AAIB's modelling showed that the vortex created by the Sea Vixen as being quadruple the strength than those of the Vampire. The equivalent roll acceleration of the Sea Vixen was greater than the roll authority the Vampire could handle at the speed being flown. A rapid roll to the right with a 90° angle, as was witnessed being executed by the Vampire, was determined to be the likely result of wake turbulence produced by the Sea Vixen in this interaction.

=== Kingcobra wreckage ===
Similarly to the wreckage of the Vampire, no mechanical failures of the Kingcobra were observed upon initial inspection. The crash site was confined to an area west of the runway angled at 70°, the right wing of the aircraft had struck the ground first with little to no ground slide. The nose of the Kingcobra was buried at a depth of approximately one metre (3 ft), with the outer of the left wing including fuel tanks detached and strewn thirteen metres (40 ft) away. Impact fire around the tanks were put out by the fire service at the airport. Fuel from the tanks had spilled to nearby vegetation, with a ring of fire marks around the rear of the engine, but not on the main wreckage.

=== Air display communication issues ===
Whilst relevant to the Biggin Hill Airshow in general, specific issues with communication were highlighted in the AAIB investigation of the Kingcobra disaster. Guidance surrounding CAP 403 published by the Civil Aviation Authority (CAA) of the United Kingdom recommends that a Flying Display Committee (now known as a Flying Control Committee or FCC) should be used. One member of this committee should be stationed at the crowd line, maintaining direct communication with the Flying Display Director. The report clarifies that the airshow at Biggin Hill did establish an FCC to oversee display standards and to make sure safety regulations were followed. A display could be stopped via a system that was in place through contact between ATC which was located on the other side of the runway and a member of the FCC by telephone or radio. Cause of concern was highlighted during the Kingcobra air display upon the loss of control at the apex of the first rolling climbing maneuver. The committee member in question did attempt to establish contact with ATC five times by radio and the director twice by telephone, however no answer was received.

== Conclusions ==
=== Vampire crash conclusions ===
With the lack of evidence for pre-impact failure within the aircraft's structure and controls, and no determinable evidence of pilot incapacitation, coupled with its improbability, it was deemed probable that the Vampire was affected by wake turbulence created by the Sea Vixen. The given reason for the Vampire's crash was that the Sea Vixen's trailing vortices exceeded that of the Vampire's aileron roll authority during the air display. This is backed by tests conducted using a Gloster Meteor as the tracking aircraft with a Vampire as the target aircraft, though at much higher altitudes. The total time from loss of control to impact was calculated, using video footage, to be less than five seconds.

=== Kingcobra crash conclusions ===
The cause for the loss of control experienced by the Kingcobra was put down to insufficient aircraft speed whilst attempting a loop maneuver. This was likely caused by a continuing loss of energy which had increased throughout the air display. This was in part a cause for the displays earlier failed maneuver as well. The pilot, Guy Bancroft-Wilson, being an experienced warbird flyer should have stopped the display once an issue with the Kingcobra was apparent, however this did not happen. Lacking a pre-planned sequence likely contributed to Bancroft-Wilson's decision making on the day of the display and during the flight.

No recovery actions were seen to be attempted with the flight control inputs or rudder after the loss of aircraft control, the rudder and ailerons moved during the foregoing attempted loop maneuver, however the elevator remained up. This would have either been caused by positive back pressure applied to the control stick or a control system jam. The latter was assumed to be the case as no evidence for Bancroft-Wilson having an issue with flight controls could be found. The spin which the aircraft entered into could have been deliberately manipulated into happening by the setup of the rudder and control inputs. If this was the case, it would mean an unknown factor played a part in affecting Bancroft-Wilson's mental and physical performance for the duration of the display.

=== Other conclusions ===
Biggin Hill Airport installed a telephone line between the FCC and the ATC tower in response to the communication issues that contributed to the airshows disasters.

== Reactions ==
In the weeks after the crash, residents of Biggin Hill were reported as being divided in their opinions on whether the Biggin Hill Airshow should continue, however they unanimously agreed that the weekend had been a terrible tragedy. Two inquest coroner's juries were held at South London Coroner's Court to return verdicts of accidental death. Sir Kenneth Hayr's son Julian was in attendance. Deputy Coroner John Sampson adjourned both hearings until the crashes had been examined. There was wider public shock, with many questioning the safety of these types of airshows. Despite the accidents, a spokesperson for the airshow maintained that "the show has had a very good reputation for safety" and that "safety is of paramount importance to us as owners and operators of Biggin Hill". Vampire co-pilot Jonathan Kerr's family made a statement describing him as a person who lived for his passion and died living it. They also acknowledged his personal ambition to reassemble and fly his own Vampire.

Despite the two fatal accidents and minor incidents, the Biggin Hill Airshow was held the following year in 2002 and continued to be held annually by Air Displays International, who had run the airshow since 1982. After this, they handed over responsibility of running the show to the airport itself. It continued to be hosted until 2011, where it was then replaced by an open house air day.
