= 1931 Jinan plane crash =

Airplane accident in China

1931 Jinan Air Crash
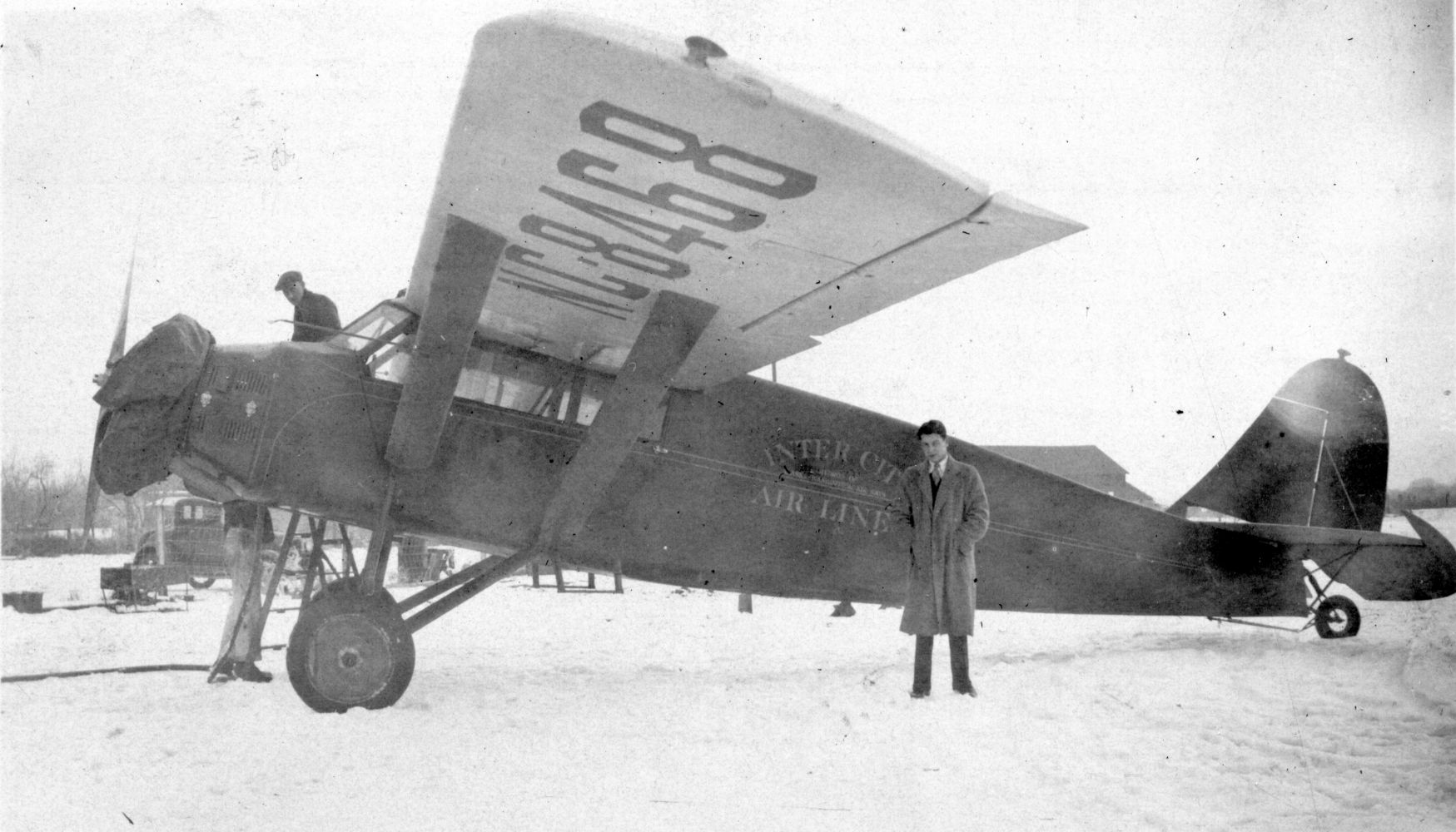
- A Stinson Detroiter, similar type to the one involved in the crash. The crashed one had a chinese character "郵" painted on its side.

Accident
- Date: November 19, 1931
- Summary: Controlled flight into terrain due to pilot error, bad weather conditions
- Site: near Changqing District, Jinan, Shandong, China; 36°33′5.43″N 116°51′31.78″E

Aircraft
- Aircraft type: Stinson Detroiter SM-1F
- Aircraft name: Jinan
- Operator: China Airways Federal
- Flight origin: Minggugong Airport, Nanjing, Republic of China
- Stopover: Xuzhou Airport, Xuzhou, Republic of China
- Destination: Nanyuan Airport, Beiping, Republic of China
- Occupants: 3
- Passengers: 1
- Crew: 2
- Fatalities: 3
- Survivors: 0

1931 Jinan Air Crash occurred on November 19, 1931, when a Stinson Detroiter mail plane carrying one passenger and two pilots crashed into a mountainous area in Jinan, Shandong Province, China. All three people on board, including the only passenger, Chinese poet Xu Zhimo, died in the crash.

The aircraft was operated by China Airways Federal in the Republic of China and was contracted by Chunghwa Post. It departed from Minggugong Airport in Nanjing, heading to Nanyuan Airport in Beiping (now Beijing). The passenger, Xu Zhimo, was intending to attend an architectural lecture given by the well-known architect Lin Huiyin in Beiping. Because of Xu's fame as a poet, the crash shocked the literary community in China.

== Background ==
=== Xu Zhimo's schedule ===
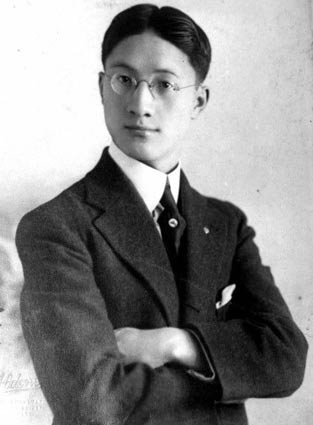
Xu Zhimo

Xu Zhimo was going to attend an architectural lecture in Beiping, presented by Lin Huiyin. It was widely believed that Xu was motivated to attend the lecture because he was romantically involved with Lin. Although Xu was warned that the weather en route to Beiping was uncertain, he insisted on flying there, since it is much faster by air and the weather had been fair before the aircraft took off.

=== The aircraft and pilots ===
External image
- "A China Airways Federal Detroiter"

External image
- "Another Detroiter mailplane of China Airways Federal"

The aircraft was a Stinson Detroiter SM-1F operated by China Airways Federal in the Republic of China and was contracted by Chunghwa Post. It was originally General Zhang Xueliang's private airplane, and Xu took the lift free. The aircraft was also carrying 500 lbs of mail. It had a nickname of Jinan.

The captain of the flight was Wang Guanyi (Chinese: 王贯一), and the first officer was Liang Bitang (Chinese: 梁璧堂), both 36 years old. They were experienced pilots graduated from Nanyuan Aviation School.

== Crash ==
The Stinson Detroiter took off around 8:00 am local time. It cruised over the path of the Jing Pu Railway, which directed the flight to Beiping. The weather was fine during the first part of the flight. The plane landed at Xuzhou Airport for refueling near 10:00 am, and took off again 10 minutes later. Captain Wang handed the controls over to first officer Liang, and moved to the passenger's seat. It then flew into Jinan airspace. The aircraft encountered severe fog and began flying off course. The pilot lost the railway in his sight, so he kept on heading for the nearby Wujiapu Airport, which would help him go back on course again. However, the plane started to descend. After the plane passed the waypoint in Changqing District, the pilot headed to the northwest for the target airport. Seconds later, the aircraft hit the peak of what is now called West Mountain below the summit, about six kilometers from Dangjiazhuang Railway Station, and broke off its right wing. This put the plane into a rapidly descending spiral, despite the fuselage remaining relatively intact. The Detroiter crashed into the valley below and disintegrated, resulting in a series of fire and explosions, killing two of the three on board instantly.

=== Crash site ===
External image
- "Exact locations of each landmarks near the crash site; the blue pin points the exact location of where the plane crashed."

The exact location of where the Stinson Detroiter crashed was controversial. The Government of the Republic of China claimed that the aircraft crashed into Mount Beida, where they erected a tomb to commemorate Xu. Popular descriptions of the crash site include West Mountain, East Mountain, North Mountain (later research showed that the three names were for the same mountain), Mount Kai, and Mount Baima.

In 2013, investigators deduced the final location of the wreckage according to the documents in the archive. With the help of a modern electronic rangefinder, they followed the Jing Pu Railway from Dangjiazhuang Station six kilometers north to a village called Chaomidian, which is north of the crash site. Ranging 1 kilometer from the village, the investigator found the valley, which was identical to eyewitness descriptions.

The investigation established that the crash site of the Stinson Detroiter was at West Mountain, which is east of Changqing District in southwest Jinan and one kilometer from the railway, at an elevation of 150 meters.

== Search and rescue ==
The crash of the Detroiter was witnessed by a patrol police officer, who immediately rushed to the scene along with some local residents. Meanwhile, Xu's friend, Liang Sicheng, was told to pick Xu up at Nanyuan Airport around 3:00 pm. Around 4:30 pm, Liang feared that the flight might have crashed and called local police.

When the rescuers found the wreckage, they discovered the bodies of the passenger and captain, with debris engulfed in flames. Xu, though not seriously burnt, had suffered from fatal cerebral trauma as well as fractured legs and several cuts on his body. Another friend of Xu, Yu Gengyu (Chinese: 于赓虞), described his corpse afterward as:

On his slightly swelled face were some white and red scars, probably because of the rinse on his face after he was found. The two eyes were not completely closed and opened a little, as if he was staring obsessively at someone. Through the glass (of the coffin), the body looked no difference from alive ...

Next to Xu, carbonic remains of captain Wang's body was also found, scarcely recognizable. Rescuers also discovered first officer Liang, who lay a meter from the two corpses. He had received burns all over his body, but was conscious. Liang was rushed to the hospital, but he died en route. The other two on board were considered to have died at the scene of the crash, probably killed instantly.

The three bodies were later transported back to Jinan, and Xu was eventually buried at Mount Beida, which local government had mistaken as the crash site.

== Investigation ==
Investigators first identified a piece of the aircraft's right wing a few meters from the mountain peak. Previously that year, a Fokker F-10 had crashed in Kansas in the United States due to a structural failure of the aircraft's wing. Investigators suspected that this might be a similar case, but after scrutinizing the debris, the theory was ruled out.

Since the crash pre-dated black boxes, investigators could only search for clues at the crash scene or in eyewitness accounts. Witnesses reported that the plane was flying dangerously low and was circling in the air seconds before the crash, suggesting that the pilots had difficulty finding their route.

In addition, there were two pilots commanding the Detroiter, whose cockpit is designed only for one pilot. The first officer was likely in control at the time of the accident due to the positions of the bodies at the crash scene.

Investigators hypothesized that the pilot descended the aircraft beneath the minimum safety altitude while attempting to seek their target, Wujiapu airport. Visibility was low due to fog, and the crew could only use compass heading to navigate. After the plane flew past Dangjiazhuang Railway Station, the first officer lost sight of the railway due to poor visibility. The airport runway lights were blocked by the mountains surrounding Jinan, but the pilot may have believed that it was only blocked by thick fog. Thus, he continued descending until the plane crashed into the mountain. Modern aircraft today would avoid such a crash with a ground proximity warning system.

The investigators believed that lack of communication between the pilots also played a major role, suggesting that the accident could have been avoided if the captain, sitting in the passenger's seat, had reminded the pilot at control that the flight was dangerously close to the terrain.

Another theory suggests that both the pilots were disoriented and failed to realize the plane was descending slowly. Therefore, the pilot could not know his exact altitude, which led to the crash.

The investigation of the Jinan air crash revealed deficiencies in early aviation regulations. The crew should have canceled the flight due to the possibility of severe meteorologic conditions.

=== Conspiracy theories ===
Some believed that the air crash was a murder arranged by Xu Zhimo's romantic rivals, and that the most likely suspect was Wang Geng (Chinese: 王赓), the former husband of Lu Xiaoman (Xu's wife).

A popular version of the crash claims that the night before the crash, the Northeast Army of the Republic of China, in which Wang Geng had served, received a secret telegram which instructed the special agents to destroy a mail plane leaving from Nanjing for Beiping. The mission was accomplished. It was a coincidence that the Detroiter planned to share the same route with the plane of their target, meaning that the plane was either shot down or blew up by spies. Investigators audited the theory through documents of Northeast Army, but confirmed it was false. There were no records of this special instruction.

== Legacy ==
断肠人琴感未消，此心久已寄云峤。
年来更识荒寒味，写到湖山总寂寥。

— Written by Xu's wife Lu Xiaoman, 1933

The literary community in China went into mourning when they heard of Xu's death. Lin Huiyin collected a piece of wreckage from the crash scene and preserved it at her bedside in memory of Xu throughout the rest of her life.

Xu's memorial park was built in 1932, a year after the crash.

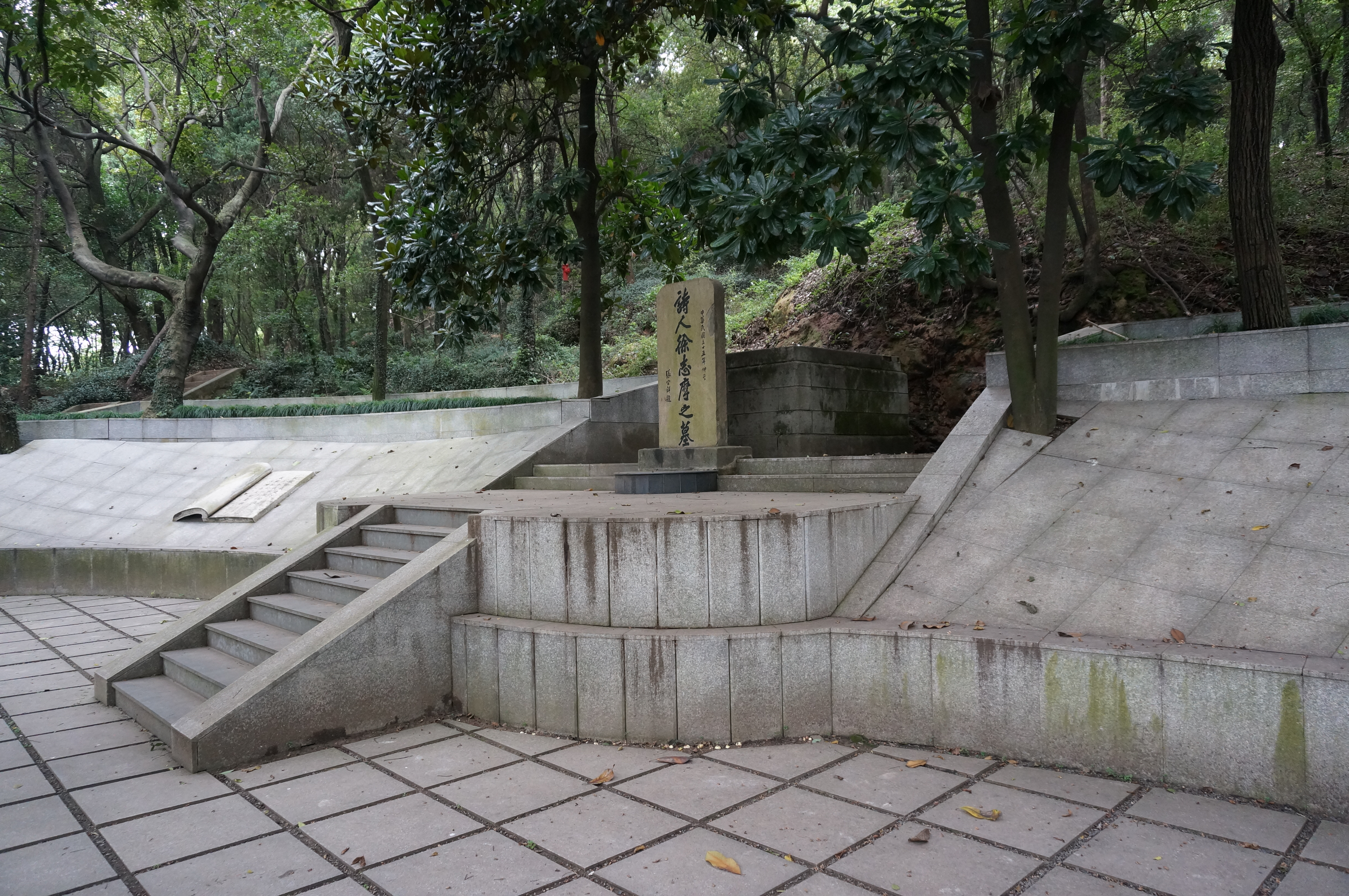
view from the side

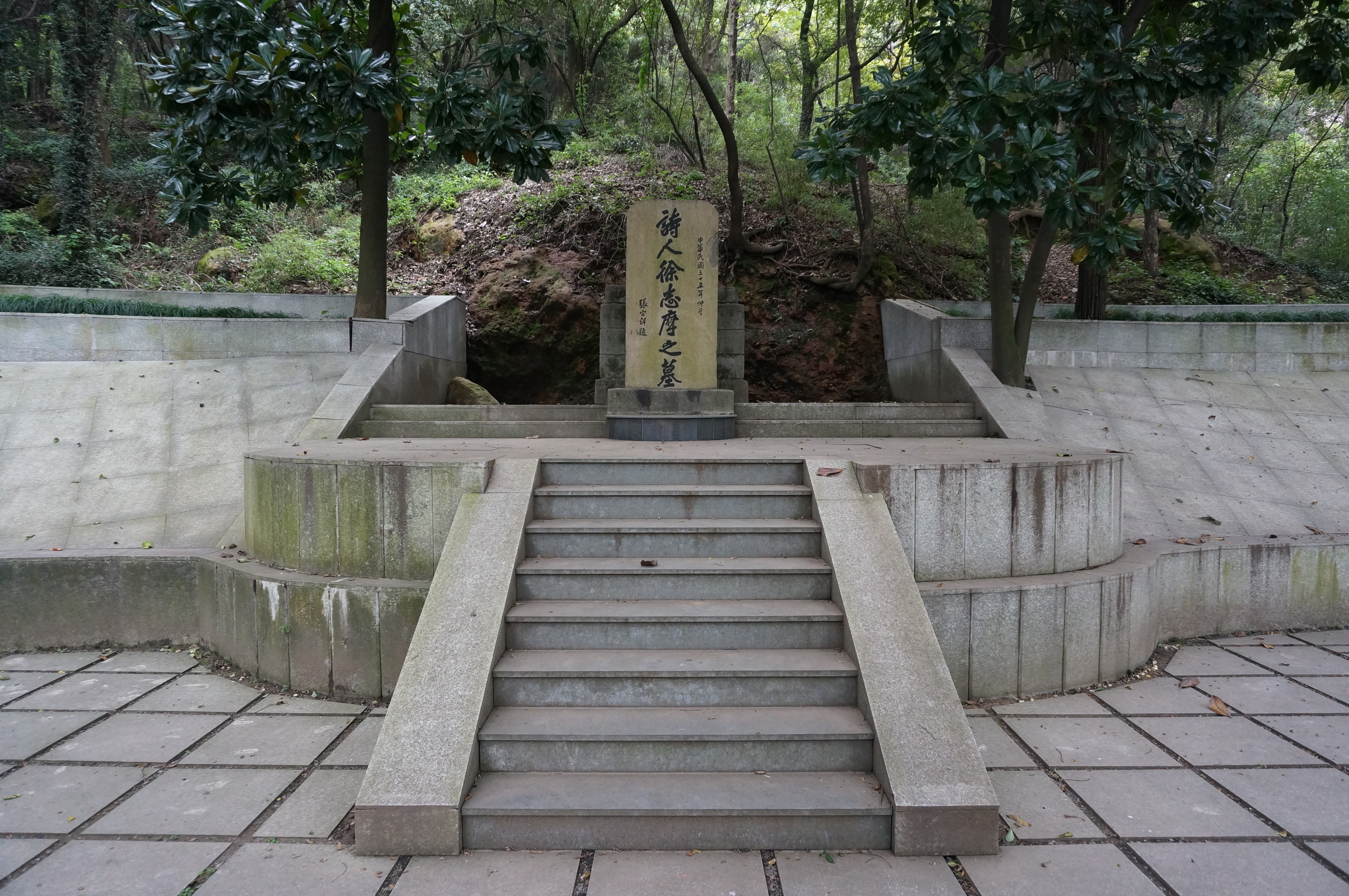
view from front

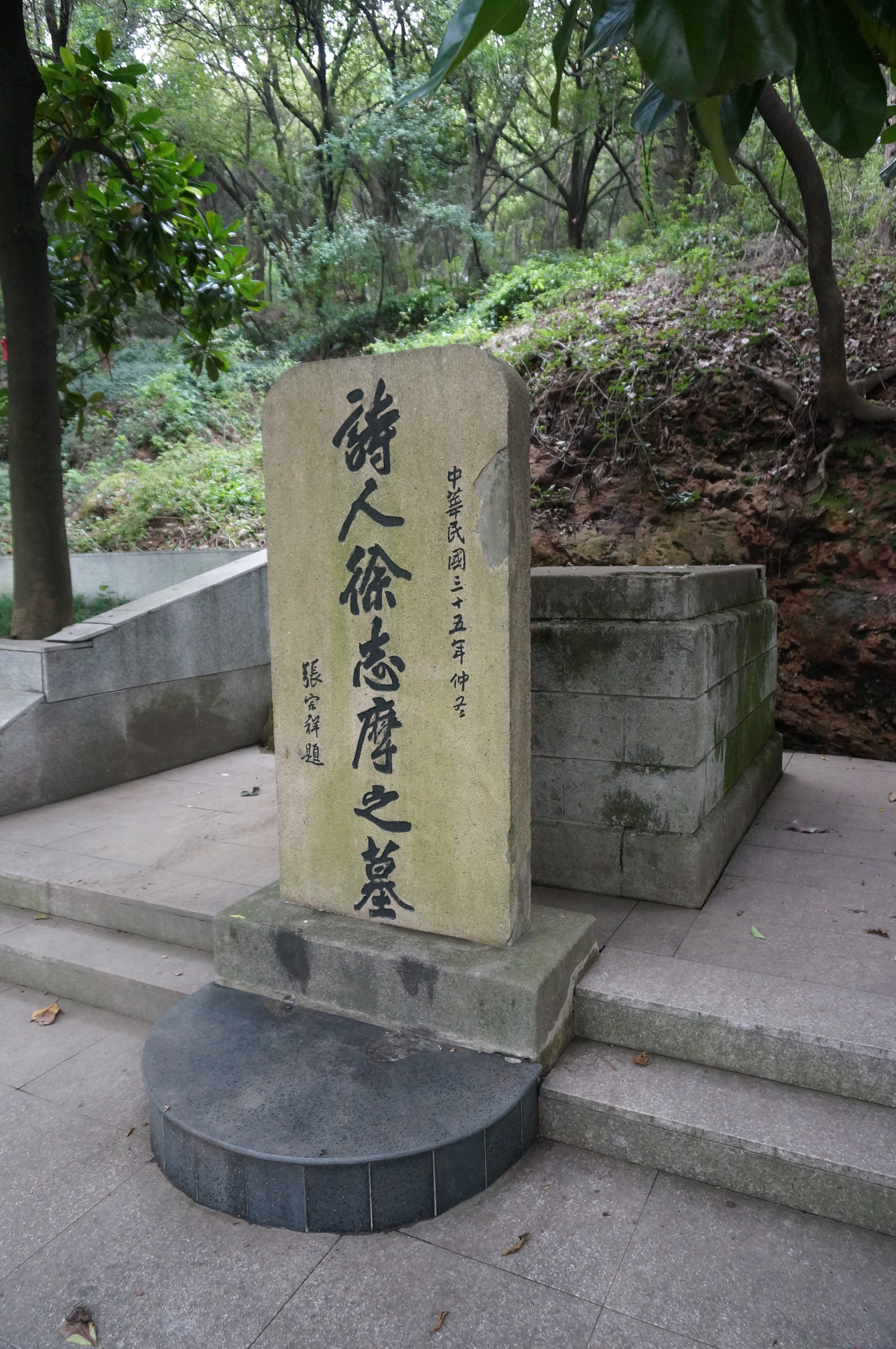
the tomb

== Similar accidents ==
- TWA Flight 3, a Douglas DC-3, crashed into a cliff moments after takeoff, killing all people on board, including the Hollywood star Carole Lombard. The crash was attributed to a navigation error by the captain, which took the plane off course moments after its departure.
- Superga air disaster. A Fiat G.212 of Avio Linee Italiane (Italian Airlines), carrying the entire Torino football team crashed into the retaining wall at the back of the Basilica of Superga, leaving no survivors. The crash was another CFIT due to low visibility.
- Air New Zealand Flight 901, a scheduled Douglas DC-10 sightseeing flight, flew into Mount Erebus in Antarctica, killing all 237 passengers and 20 crew on board. The air crash was a typical CFIT.
- 1996 Croatia USAF CT-43 crash. A United States Air Force Boeing CT-43A crashed on approach to Dubrovnik, Croatia, while on an official trade mission. The crash was ascribed to the poorly designed instrument approaching systems in Dubrovnik Airport as well as pilot error.
