= Air Alderney =

Airline of Alderney, Channel Islands

IATA	ICAO	Call sign
-	PUF	PUFFIN
- Founded: 31 January 2017
- Commenced operations: 7 February 2022
- Operating bases: Biggin Hill Airport; Alderney Airport
- Fleet size: 10
- Destinations: 4
- Headquarters: Biggin Hill Airport
- Key people: Danny Brem-Wilson

Air Alderney Limited is an airline that has, for some years, been projected to serve the island of Alderney, part of the Bailiwick of Guernsey in the Channel Islands. Air Alderney was founded on 31 January 2017, and faced numerous delays in commencing operations.

== History ==
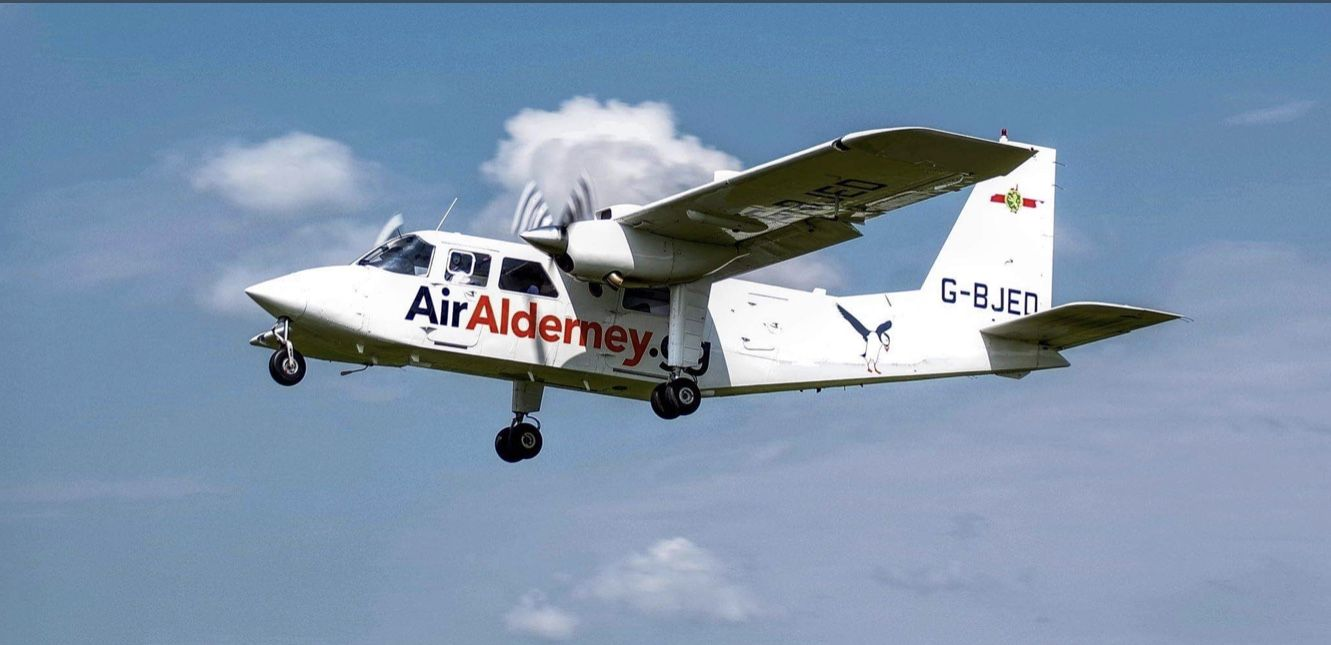
Air Alderney Britten-Norman Islander G-BJED, 2020

The airline originally acquired permission to operate flights in early 2017, with licenses issued by the States of Alderney effective March 2018. After a series of delays, Air Alderney planned to commence operations in February 2020, however the States of Alderney ruled that the airline's licenses were no longer valid. It has been reported that Air Alderney is intending to work alongside English airline Directflight, which operate regional flights in Shetland, Scotland. The licensing issues were later resolved and the CAA re-issued the required Operating License in late 2021.

Air Alderney currently owns two Britten-Norman BN2B-26 Islander light aircraft. The airline plans to acquire a single Britten-Norman BN2A MkIII Trislander prior to commencing scheduled services in Q4 2022. Working alongside Britten-Norman, the aircraft will be fully refurbished prior to commencing operations.

The airline launched charter operations on 7 February 2022, operating flights between Alderney, Biggin Hill, Shoreham-by-Sea (Lydd), Guernsey and Jersey. In a social media statement Air Alderney indicated that they plan to launch scheduled services in 2022. In March 2023, Air Alderney announced that they would operate flights from Lydd Airport, starting in summer 2023.

Air Alderney Britten-Norman BN-2 Islander G-BLNI, 2021

== Destinations ==
Country	City	Airport	Notes
Alderney	St Anne	Alderney Airport	Base
Guernsey	Forest	Guernsey Airport	
Jersey	St Peter	Jersey Airport	
United Kingdom	Shoreham	Brighton City Airport	
United Kingdom	Biggin Hill	Biggin Hill Airport	Base
United Kingdom	Lydd	Lydd Airport	

== Fleet ==
As of March 2022, Air Alderney appeared to have access to the following aircraft:

Air Alderney fleet
Aircraft	In service	Orders	Notes
Britten-Norman BN2B-26 Islander	3		
Britten-Norman BN2A MkIII Trislander	0	1	from late 2022
Total	2	1	
