= 1980 Biggin Hill Invader crash =

Flight that crashed during an air show in 1980

Coordinates: 51.319°N 0.021°E

Biggin Hill Invader crash
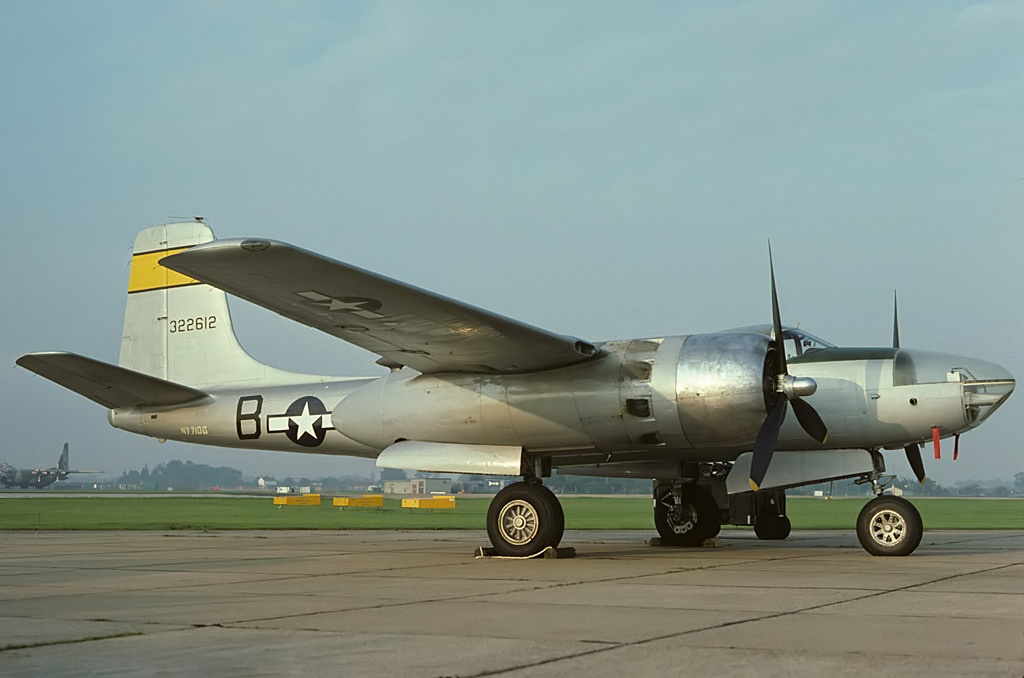
- The accident aircraft in 1978

Accident
- Date: 21 September 1980
- Site

Aircraft
- Aircraft type: Douglas A-26C-25-DT Invader
- Aircraft name: Double Trouble
- Operator: Euroworld
- Registration: N3710G
- Flight origin: Biggin Hill, United Kingdom
- Occupants: 7
- Passengers: 6
- Crew: 1
- Fatalities: 7

The Biggin Hill Invader crash was an accident involving a Douglas A-26 Invader aircraft which crashed during an airshow at Biggin Hill, United Kingdom, on 21 September 1980. The pilot and six passengers were killed, prompting the Civil Aviation Authority to introduce rules preventing passengers from being carried during air displays.

== Aircraft ==
The Douglas A-26 Invader was a twin-engined medium bomber built for the United States Army Air Forces (USAAF) around 1943. It had been sold after the war and had been operated from England since the mid-1970s as a warbird in USAAF markings as "322612", with the nickname Double Trouble. Its aircraft registration number was N3710G.

== Accident ==
During the Biggin Hill Battle of Britain airshow, the Invader made a fast run along the crowd line at 150 feet (46 m) then attempted to carry out either a barrel roll or a wingover. When the aircraft was inverted, the roll rate increased and it dived into the ground in the valley at the end of the runway. The pilot and six passengers were killed.
