= Kenneth Hayr =

Royal Air Force Air Marshal (1935-2001)

Air Marshal Sir Kenneth Hayr KCB KBE AFC & Bar
- Born: 13 April 1935; Whangārei, New Zealand
- Died: 2 June 2001 (aged 66); Bromley, England
- Military career
- Allegiance: New Zealand; United Kingdom
- Branch: Royal New Zealand Air Force (1954–57); Royal Air Force (1957–93)
- Service years: 1954–1993
- Rank: Air Marshal
- Commands: British Forces Cyprus (1985–88); No. 11 Group (1982–85); RAF Binbrook (1974–76); No. 1 Squadron (1970–72)
- Conflicts: Falklands War; Gulf War
- Awards: Knight Commander of the Order of the Bath; Knight Commander of the Order of the British Empire; Air Force Cross & Bar

Air Marshal Sir Kenneth William Hayr, KCB, KBE, AFC & Bar (13 April 1935 – 2 June 2001) was a senior Royal Air Force commander who served as Deputy Air Officer Commanding-in-Chief Strike Command and Deputy Chief of the Defence Staff (Commitments).

== Early life and flying career ==
Born in Whangārei, New Zealand, Hayr was educated at Auckland Grammar School. He joined the Royal New Zealand Air Force and was sent to the United Kingdom to attend the RAF College Cranwell, graduating in 1957.

Hayr was Officer Commanding No. 228 Operational Conversion Unit at RAF Coningsby during the introduction of the McDonnell Douglas Phantom and subsequent training of No. 6 and No. 54 Squadrons. He was then appointed Officer Commanding No. 1 Squadron in 1970. The following year, he married Joyce Gardiner: they had three sons. Hayr served as Station Commander at RAF Binbrook in Lincolnshire in 1974. He attended the Royal College of Defence Studies, after which he took up the post of Assistant Chief of the Air Staff (Operations) in 1980. During this period he was responsible for much of the planning of the RAF's part in the re-capture of the Falkland Islands. In 1982, he was made Air Officer Commanding No. 11 Group.

Hayr became Commander, British Forces Cyprus and Administrator of the Sovereign Base Areas in 1985. Returning to Britain he was Deputy Air Officer Commanding-in-Chief Strike Command from 1988 until being appointed Deputy Chief of the Defence Staff (Commitments) at the Ministry of Defence in 1989, which in 1990 involved him leading the preparation for Operation Granby.

== Later life and legacy ==
On retirement Hayr returned to New Zealand and took up the Chairmanship of the New Zealand Aviation Heritage Trust Board, but continued to split his time between the UK and New Zealand in order to continue his love for flying by performing displays in various vintage aircraft. It was in such an aircraft, a De Havilland Vampire, that he was killed during the 2001 Biggin Hill air display.

In 1996, the Inspectorate of Flight Safety moved into new purpose-built accommodation at RAF Bentley Priory and the facility's new lecture theatre was named 'The Hayr Theatre' in honour of Hayr who was the first Inspector in 1976 (prior to that date the post had been that of Director). Following the closure of Bentley Priory his picture now hangs in the DARS Course Members Tea bar at RAF Northolt in memory of the Lecture theatre at RAF Bentley Priory.

Military offices
Preceded by Peter Harding	Air Officer Commanding No. 11 Group; 1982–1985	Succeeded by Michael Stear
Preceded by Sir Desmond Langley	Commander British Forces Cyprus; 1985–1988	Succeeded by John Friedberger
Preceded by Sir Brendan Jackson	Deputy Commander-in-Chief Strike Command; 1988–1989	Succeeded by Sir John Kemball
Preceded by Sir Antony Walker	Deputy Chief of the Defence Staff (Commitments); 1989–1992	Succeeded by Sir Nicholas Hill-Norton
