= John Kemball =

Royal Air Force Air Marshal (1939–2021)

Sir John Kemball
- Born: 31 January 1939
- Died: 13 June 2021 (aged 82)
- Military career
- Allegiance: United Kingdom
- Branch: Royal Air Force
- Service years: 1957–1993
- Rank: Air Marshal
- Commands: British Forces on the Falkland Islands; Central Flying School; RAF Laarbruch; No. 54 Squadron
- Awards: Knight Commander of the Order of the Bath; Commander of the Order of the British Empire

Air Marshal Sir Richard John Kemball, KCB, CBE, DL (31 January 1939 – 13 June 2021) was a Royal Air Force officer who served as Deputy Commander of Strike Command.

== RAF career ==
Kemball was commissioned into the Royal Air Force in 1957. He was appointed Officer Commanding No. 54 Squadron in 1976 and became Station Commander at RAF Laarbruch in 1978. He went on to be Commandant of the RAF Central Flying School in 1983 and Commander of British Forces on the Falkland Islands in 1985 before becoming Chief of Staff and Deputy Commander-in-Chief of Strike Command in 1989. During the First Gulf War, Kemball was chief of staff and deputy commander-in-chief at the British Joint Force Headquarters. He retired in 1993.

In retirement, he became Chief Executive of the Racing Welfare Charity, Chairman of Essex Rivers NHS Healthcare Trust and High Sheriff of Suffolk in 2007. He died on 13 June 2021.

Military offices
Preceded by Sir Kenneth Hayr	Deputy Commander-in-Chief Strike Command; 1989–1993	Succeeded by Sir Richard Johns
