= London Biggin Hill Airport =

Airport near London, England

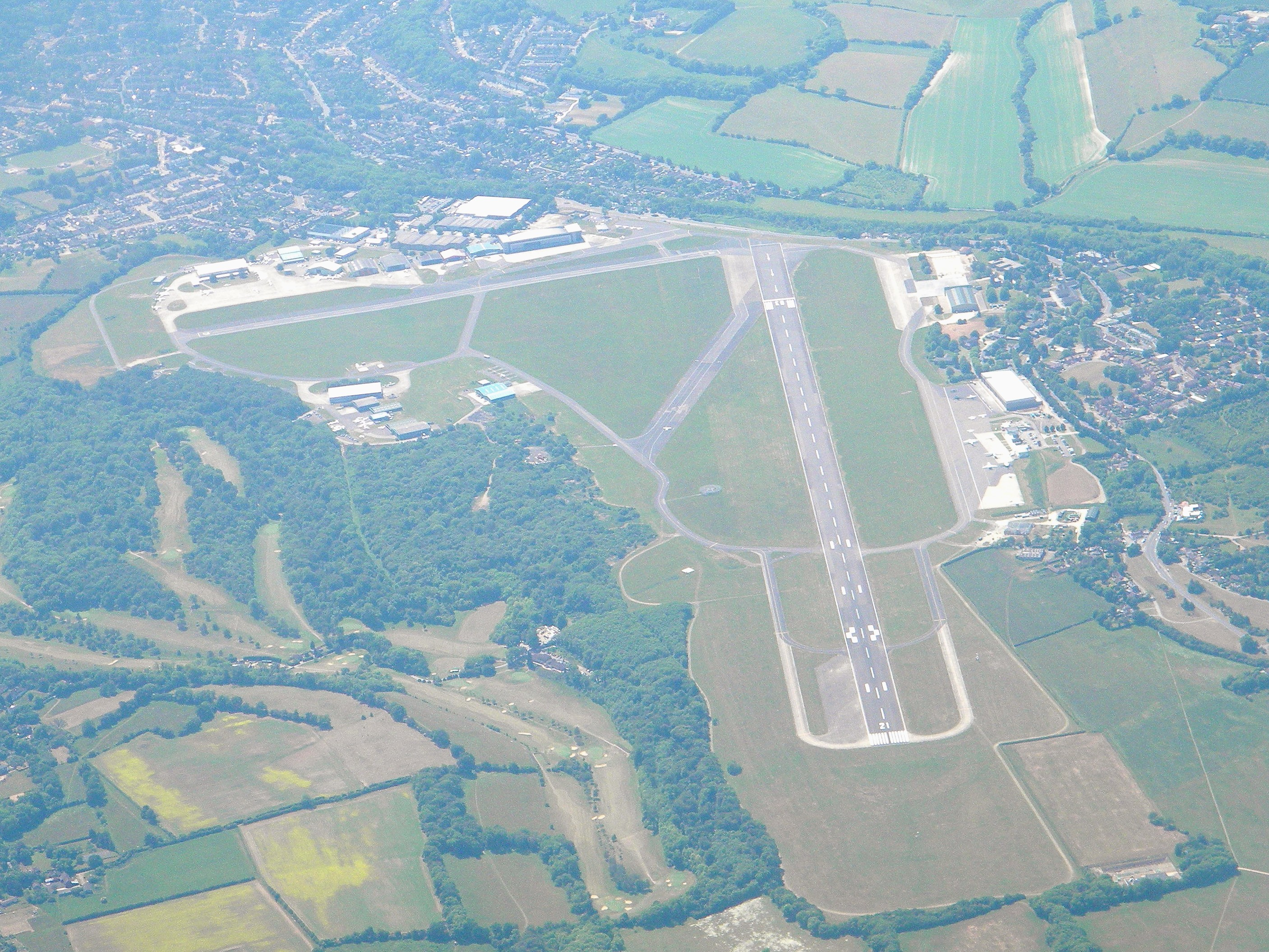
- IATA: BQH; ICAO: EGKB

Summary
- Airport type: Public
- Owner: London Borough of Bromley
- Operator: Biggin Hill Airport Limited
- Location: Biggin Hill, London, England
- Elevation AMSL: 599 ft (183 m)
- Coordinates: 51°19′51″N 000°01′57″E
- Website: bigginhillairport.com

Map
- Location in Greater London EGKB (England) EGKB (Europe)

Runways
Direction	Length		Surface
Direction	m	ft	Surface
03/21	1,820	5,971	Tarmac

Statistics (2018)
- Movements: 43,343
- Sources: UK AIP at NATS; Statistics from the UK Civil Aviation Authority

London Biggin Hill Airport (IATA: BQH, ICAO: EGKB) is a general aviation and minor commercial airport in Biggin Hill in the London Borough of Bromley, 12 NM (22 km; 14 mi) south-southeast of Central London. It handles traffic from private aviation to large business jets. It currently has no scheduled airline service, as flights using the airport are not regularly permitted to carry fare-paying passengers.

The airport was formerly a Royal Air Force station, RAF Biggin Hill, and a small enclave on the airport still retains that designation. Biggin Hill is best known for its role during the Battle of Britain in the Second World War, when it served as one of the principal fighter bases protecting London and South East England from attack by German Luftwaffe bombers. Over the course of the war, fighters based at Biggin Hill claimed 1,400 enemy aircraft, at the cost of the lives of 453 aircrew.

== History ==
=== Military airfield ===
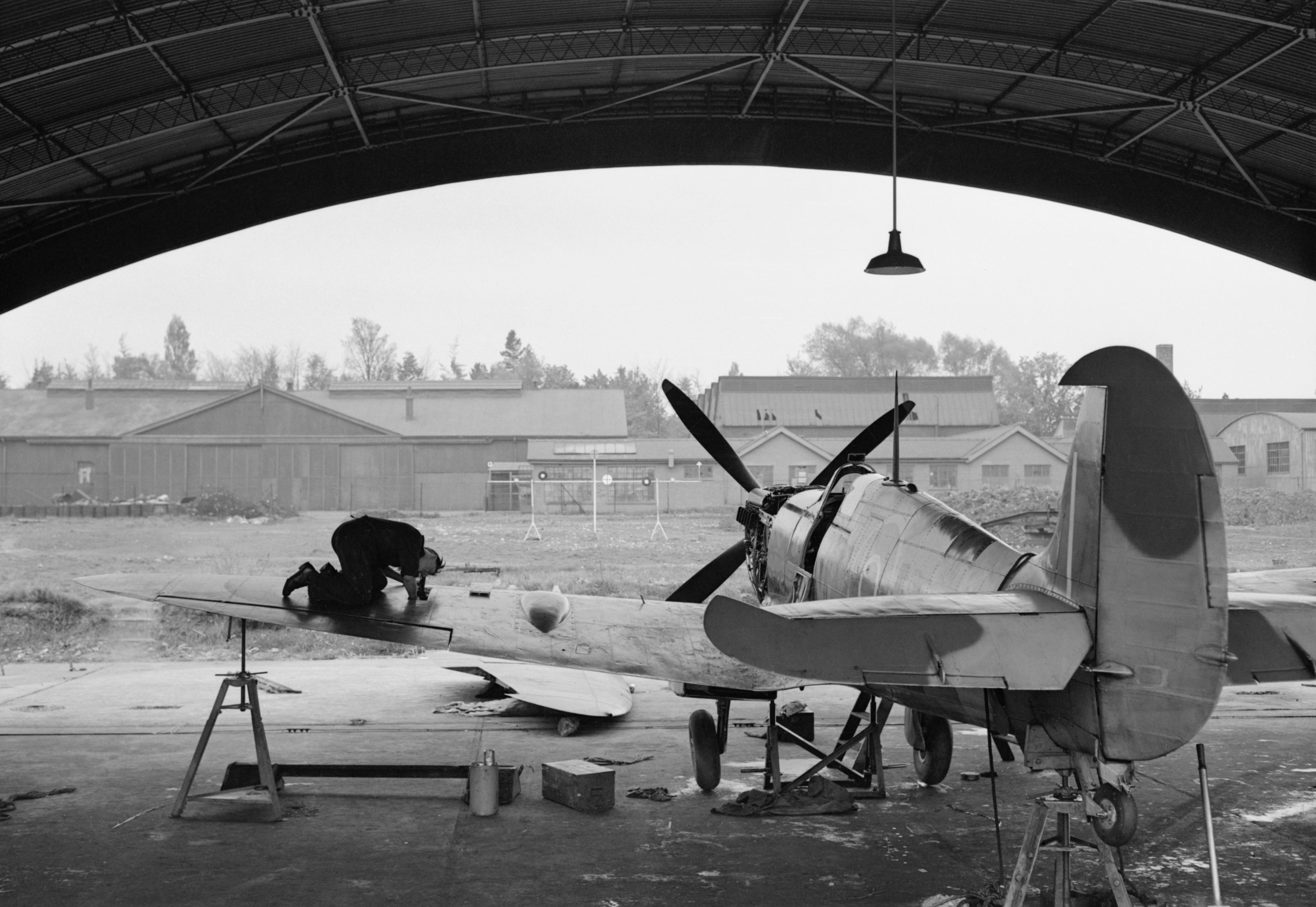
An armourer adjusting machine guns on a Spitfire at Biggin Hill during the Second World War

==== First World War ====
The airfield was originally opened by the Royal Flying Corps (RFC) during the First World War. Koonowla House was requisitioned by the War Office in 1916 for the RFC to conduct wireless experiments. Then on 13 February 1917 the RFC transferred there (from their long-time HQ at RAF Joyce Green, at Long Reach near Dartford), and established it as part of the London Air Defence Area, using the adjacent Cudham Lodge estate, which contained a huge undivided field ideal for aircraft. The same year Lord Stanhope's Aperfield Court and grounds, some 2 miles (3.2 km) from the station, were requisitioned for use as a radio transmitter and fighter ground control station. The station was responsible for defending the capital against attacks by Zeppelins and Gotha bombers. To this end, 141 Squadron of the RFC was based at Biggin Hill and equipped with Bristol Fighters.

Shortly after the war, on 7 January 1919, around 700 RAF technical staff mutinied. Their grievances included poor food and living conditions, with one complaint being that they only had eight washbasins between them. The mutiny was ended by the intervention of sympathetic officers.

Apperfield Court was demolished in 1920 and the aerodrome extended onto its grounds. Between the wars, the airfield was used by a number of experimental units, working on instrument design, ground-based anti-aircraft defences, and night flying. The base was closed between 1929 and 1932, during which period reconstruction work took place including the building of new hangars.

==== Second World War ====
During the Second World War the airfield was one of the commanding bases for No. 11 Group RAF, RAF Fighter Command during the Battle of Britain, with both Supermarine Spitfires and Hawker Hurricanes from a variety of squadrons being based there. The squadrons based at Biggin Hill claimed to have destroyed 1,400 enemy aircraft, at the cost of the lives of 453 Biggin Hill-based aircrew. Due to its importance to the defence of London, the airfield itself became a target. Between August 1940 and January 1941, the airfield was attacked twelve times, the worst of which wrecked workshops, stores, barracks, WAAF quarters and a hangar, killing 39 people on the ground.

During the war Biggin Hill was also used by RAF Balloon Command.

==== Post war ====
After the war, Biggin Hill was briefly used by RAF Transport Command, and then became a base for both regular and reserve fighter squadrons, flying Spitfires, Meteors and Hunters. A fatal incident involving the loss of three Meteors on 18 June 1951 (see incidents and accidents below) caused the station's continued use by the military to be called into question. However, in 1958 Biggin Hill ceased to be an operational RAF station, becoming the Officer and Aircrew Selection Centre for the RAF. Due to the impending closure of the nearby original London Airport at Croydon, from 1956 much of the civilian light aviation from Croydon relocated to Biggin Hill and it became a joint civilian and military airport. Croydon closed completely in 1959, at which time Biggin Hill became a mainly civilian airport with only occasional military flying taking place.

==== RAF units at Biggin Hill ====
The following units were at Biggin Hill at some time:

- No. 1 Squadron RAF
- No. 3 Squadron RAF
- No. 19 Squadron RAF
- No. 23 Squadron RAF
- No. 32 Squadron RAF
- No. 37 Squadron RAF
- No. 39 Squadron RAF
- No. 41 Squadron RAF
- No. 56 Squadron RAF
- No. 64 Squadron RAF
- No. 66 Squadron RAF
- No. 72 Squadron RAF
- No. 74 Squadron RAF
- No. 78 Squadron RAF
- No. 79 (Madras Presidency) Squadron RAF
- No. 91 (Nigeria) Squadron RAF
- No. 92 (East India) Squadron RAF
- No. 124 (Baroda) Squadron RAF
- No. 133 (Eagle) Squadron RAF
- No. 154 (Motor Industries) Squadron RAF
- No. 213 (Ceylon) Squadron RAF
- No. 222 (Natal) Squadron RAF
- No. 229 Squadron RAF
- No. 242 (Canadian) Squadron RAF
- No. 264 (Madras Presidency) Squadron RAF
- No. 287 Squadron RAF
- No. 322 (Dutch) Squadron RAF
- No. 340 (GC IV/2 Île-de-France) Squadron RAF
- No. 341 (GC III/2 'Alsace') Squadron RAF
- No. 345 (GC II/2 'Berry') Squadron RAF
- No. 401 Squadron RCAF
- No. 411 Squadron RCAF
- No. 412 Squadron RCAF
- No. 436 Squadron RCAF
- No. 485 Squadron RNZAF
- No. 600 (City of London) Squadron AAF
- No. 601 (County of London) Squadron AAF
- No. 602 (City of Glasgow) Squadron AAF
- No. 609 (West Riding) Squadron AAF
- No. 610 (County of Chester) Squadron AAF
- No. 611 (West Lancashire) Squadron AAF
- No. 615 (County of Surrey) Squadron AAF
- 802 Naval Air Squadron
- 807 Naval Air Squadron
- 819 Naval Air Squadron
- No. 945/947 (Balloon) Squadron
- No. 951 (Balloon) Squadron
- No. 953 (Balloon) Squadron
- No. 958 (Balloon) Squadron

Units

- No. 1 Anti-Aircraft Co-operation Unit RAF (1 AACU) (February – May 1937 & September 1937 – April 1938)
- 'C' Flight of 1 AACU (March – May 1937)
- 'D' Flight of 1 AACU (September 1937 – April 1938)
- 'H' Flight of 1 AACU (April – September 1939)
- No. 1 Air Experience Flight RAF (September 1958 – February 1959)
- No. 1 Fighter Command Servicing Unit
- No. 2 Fighter Command Servicing Unit
- No. 5 (Home Defence) Wing RAF (April 1923 - April 1924)
- No. 6 Radio Maintenance Unit (July - August 1940)
- No. 6 Radio Servicing Section (September 1940 - February 1941)
- No. 8 Fighter Command Servicing Unit
- No. 61 Group Communication Flight RAF (March 1958 - January 1959)
- No. 126 Airfield Headquarters RAF (October 1943 - April 1944)
- No. 141 (Fighter) Wing RAF (October - November 1944)
- No. 162 Gliding School RAF (June 1949 - August 1950)
- No. 403 Repair & Salvage Unit (October - September 1943)
- No. 405 Repair & Salvage Unit (November 1943 - January 1944)
- No. 410 Repair & Salvage Unit (January - April 1944)
- No. 421 (Reconnaissance) Flight RAF (November 1940)
- No. 2705 Squadron RAF Regiment
- No. 2709 Squadron RAF Regiment
- No. 2726 Squadron RAF Regiment
- No. 2745 Squadron RAF Regiment
- No. 2767 Squadron RAF Regiment
- No. 2803 Squadron RAF Regiment
- No. 2806 Squadron RAF Regiment
- No. 2824 Squadron RAF Regiment
- No. 2847 Squadron RAF Regiment
- No. 4045 Anti-Aircraft Flight RAF Regiment
- Aircrew Selection Centre RAF (April 1962)
- Anti-Aircraft Co-operation Flight RAF (October 1931 - April 1936) became Anti-Aircraft Co-operation Unit RAF (April 1936 - February 1937)
- Ground Officers Selection Centre RAF (April 1962)
- Historic Aircraft Flight RAF (July 1957 - February 1958) became Battle of Britain Flight RAF (February 1958)
- Instrument Design Establishment RAF (November 1919 - March 1920) became Instrument Design Establishment (Home) RAF (March 1920 - April 1922)
- London University Air Squadron (October 1946 - December 1947)
- Detachment from Metropolitan Sector HQ RAF (1946 - 47)
- Navigation Flight RAF (March - April 1920)
- Night Flying Flight RAF (July 1923 - October 1931)
- Officer and Aircrew Selection Centre (April 1962 - September 1992)
- South Eastern Sector HQ RAF (November 1945 - June 1946)
- University of London Air Squadron (April 1957 - February 1959)
- Wireless Telephony School RAF (April 1918)
- Wireless Testing Park RAF (January - December 1917) became Wireless Experimental Establishment RAF (December 1917 - April 1918) became W/T Establishment RAF (April 1918 - November 1919)

=== Civilian airport ===
Towards the end of 1963, the Orpington Urban District Council (within whose boundaries the airfield lay) was approached by the Board of Trade as to whether the Council would purchase (effectively from the RAF) Biggin Hill airfield. In 1964, the London Borough of Bromley was formed, absorbing Orpington Council, and the offer to purchase was carried over to the new borough. Protracted negotiations were held with the Board of Trade and later the Department of Trade and Industry. At a special meeting on 15 June 1972 the Council decided to purchase the airport by a recorded vote of 41 to 9. The purchase was eventually completed in 1974. RAF Biggin Hill was awarded the Freedom of the Borough of Bromley on 5 October 1980.

In May 1992 the Department of Transport issued a direction to the Council under s.13 of the Airports Act 1986. The effect of this direction, which affected airports generating turnover of £1 million or more (Biggin Hill just scraped into this limit), was to require the Council to set up a new company for the purpose of operating the airport as an independent commercial undertaking. To comply with the direction would have required the transfer of all the assets and liabilities to the company with a consequential loss of council control over airport activities. In the circumstances, the council decided that the granting of a 125-year lease would enable more control to be retained than an outright disposal of the freehold or by a transfer to a local authority company with an uncertain future. In May 1994, the airport was leased to Biggin Hill Airport Limited ("BHAL"), now a subsidiary of Regional Airports Limited, for 125 years.

The Officer and Aircrew Selection Centre moved to RAF Cranwell in 1992, marking the end of active RAF involvement.

In 2001, the London Borough of Bromley as freeholder of the airport succeeded in an action in the Court of Appeal. The court ruling prohibits the airport operators from allowing tickets to be sold for flights into and out of the airport, thus preventing its use for scheduled or holiday charter flights, but allowing business aviation and corporate shuttles.

In May 2017 runway 29/11 was permanently withdrawn from use.

In addition to recreational flying and flight training for light aircraft and helicopters, the airport is a popular destination for private jets and business aviation. It is home to Bombardier's London Service Centre, serves fractional aircraft ownership operators such as NetJets, and acts as a key broadcasting hub for Formula One.

== Description ==
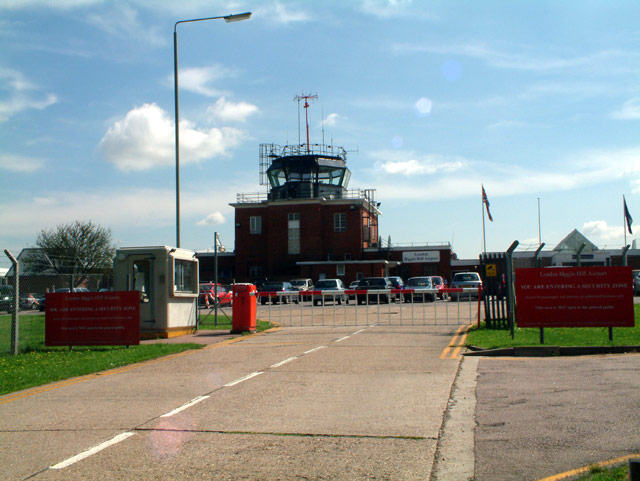
Airport buildings (2005)

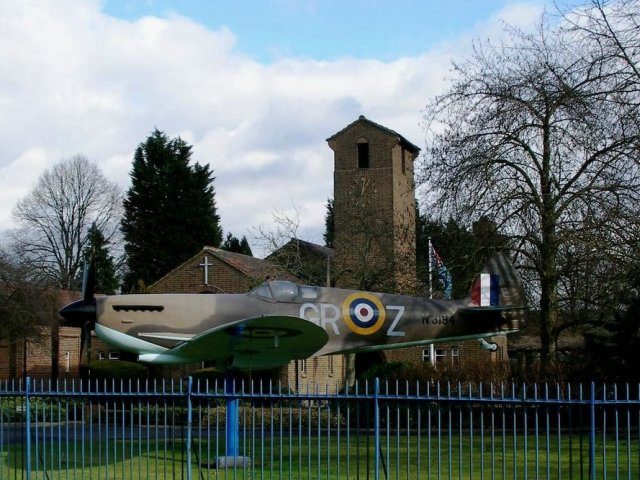
St George's Chapel of Remembrance, with a replica Spitfire outside

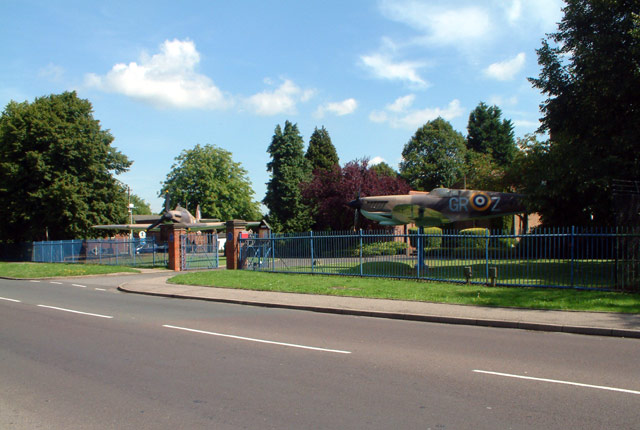
Replicas of Hurricane and a Spitfire stand watch over the entrance to the chapel of the former RAF station.

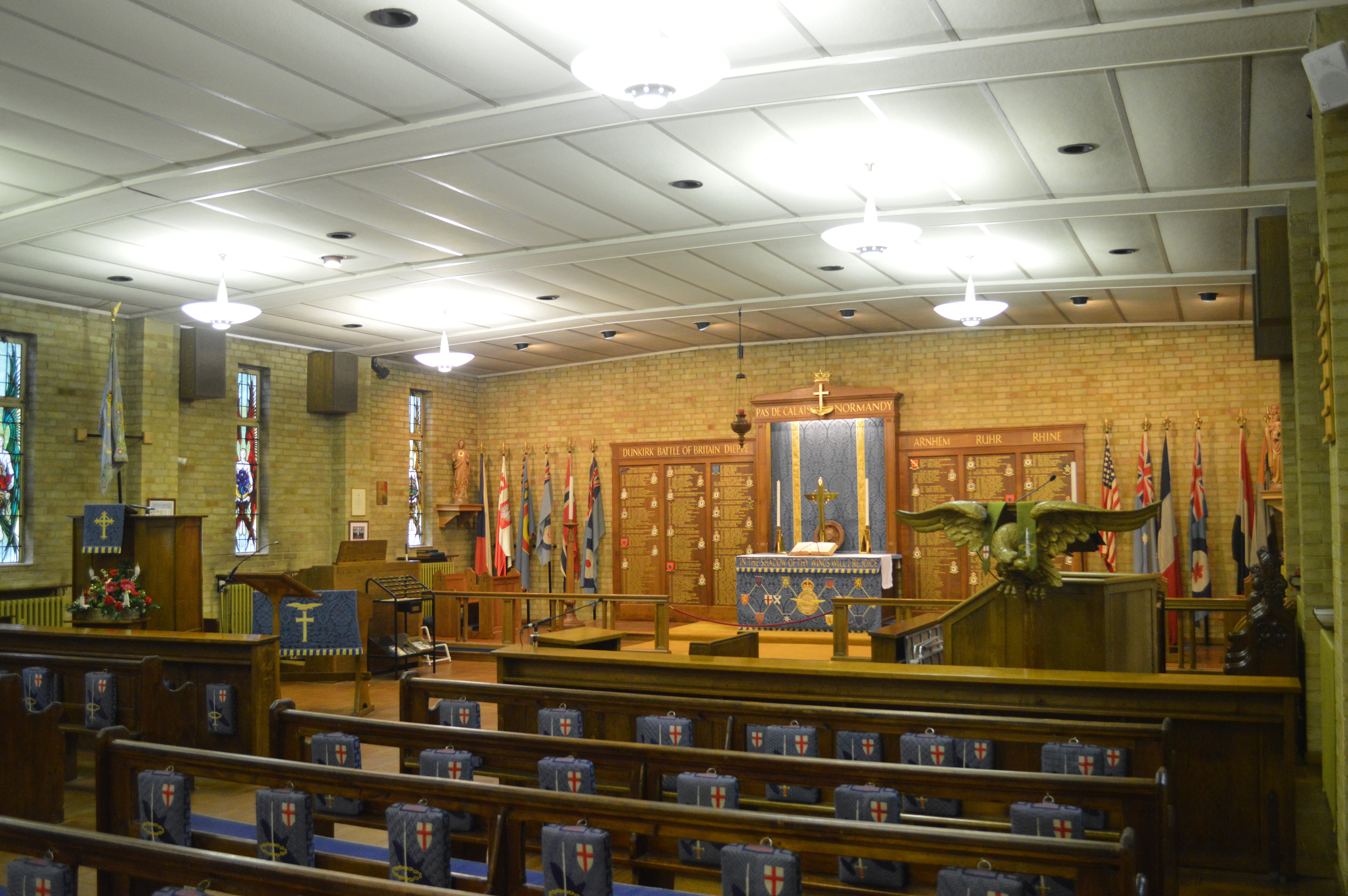
Interior of St George's Chapel of Remembrance

The airport is located on a hilltop, just to the east of the Bromley to Westerham road (A233) and about 1 mile (1.6 km) to the north of the town of Biggin Hill in the London Borough of Bromley. It is in a rural area to the south-east of Greater London, outside of the Greater London Built-up Area. The small village of Leaves Green lies adjacent to the north-western perimeter of the airport.

The airport has one runway (03/21, so close to northeast by north/southwest by west) 1,820 m (5,970 ft) in length, making it usable by aircraft up to Boeing 737/Airbus A321 size, and it has an Instrument Landing System for runway 21 (when runway 03 is in use, a visual 'circle to land' procedure is required). Radar air traffic control (ATC) services are provided by Thames Radar at the London Terminal Control Centre, while procedural approach and VFR ATC services are provided by the airport itself.

Biggin Hill is used for business flights by business jets and similar-sized aircraft. The airport has a passenger terminal, located on the A233 road just south of Leaves Green, which provides facilities for such flights, including departure lounges, a licensed café bar, and customs and immigration facilities.

The current RAF Biggin Hill is a small enclave on the western boundary of the airport to the south of the passenger terminal, and contains the headquarters of 2427 Squadron of the Air Training Corps. Next to this is St George's Chapel of Remembrance. This brick built chapel was erected in 1951, to replace an earlier chapel destroyed by fire, and now serves as a memorial to all the aircrew who died flying from the Biggin Hill Sector. It is surrounded by a garden of remembrance and has gate guardians in the form of full-sized replicas of a Hurricane and a Spitfire, representing the aircraft that flew from the former airfield during the Battle of Britain. The replicas replaced genuine aircraft that formerly served as the guardians. Air Marshal Hugh Dowding laid the foundation stone. The chapel was taken out of the RAF's control in 2015, and is now owned by Biggin Hill Memorial Museum Trust.

Besides the passenger terminal and RAF enclave, other former RAF buildings still exist in the 'North Camp' to the west of the main runway, including the Sergeant's Mess of 1932, the Airmen's Institute of circa 1926, the former Station Headquarters building of 1931 and several barrack blocks. The buildings, which are Grade II listed, are in a redbrick neo-Georgian style typical of military airfields of the interwar period. They have been vacant since the Officer and Aircrew Selection Centre closed in 1992, and were added to English Heritage's list of buildings at risk in 2006.

The 'South Camp', situated to the south of runway 11/29, was transferred to civil usage in the 1950s and now consists of a utilitarian collection of hangars and sheds, together with a modern office park. It now contains many aviation related businesses, flying clubs and flying schools. Many private light aircraft are based on the airport.

From 1963, Biggin Hill airport was the venue of the Biggin Hill International Air Fair, an annual airshow that usually took place towards the end of June. On 5 July 2010 Biggin Hill Airport Ltd cancelled the 25-year contract with the organisers, Air Displays International, without warning, a few weeks after the 2010 event.

Construction on a new state-of-the-art hangar alongside the Passenger Terminal commenced in October 2010. Excavations of the site uncovered underground war-time fuel tanks and associated pump rooms; these were re-covered during the same building works. Construction was planned to finish late in Spring 2011.

Biggin Hill is the location of one of the four "stacks" for aircraft landing at Heathrow Airport, and is used by aircraft approaching from the south east. It uses a VOR navigational beacon with the identifier "BIG".

Three model aircraft clubs operate within a 3-mile (4.8 km) radius of Biggin Hill Airport. One site operates within its Aerodrome Traffic Zone (2.5 NM (4.6 km; 2.9 mi) radius)

For 60 years an Air Scout centre was located on the grounds of the airport. The centre allowed young people aged between 7 and 18 to take part in aviation activities with their scout groups. In 2016, Biggin Hill Airport Limited rescinded its sub-lease to the Scout Aviation Centre in order to make way for new car parking spaces, giving them until 30 September 2016 to vacate.

The airfield still retains its history by the continued restoration projects running at the Biggin Hill Heritage Hangar. IntotheBlue experience days, a UK company within the airfield, allows members of the public to fly alongside a Mk9 Spitfire in a 1950s Harvard.

== Airlines and destinations ==
Commercial service to the airport has previously been rejected. An application by the airport to allow such flights around the time of the 2012 London Olympics was rejected by Bromley Council in March 2011. Under the terms of its lease, no scheduled or fare-paying passenger services are permitted to operate to or from the airport. Air Alderney announced it planned to launch charter services between the airport and Alderney.

== Accidents at airport ==
- On 18 June 1951, three Gloster Meteors crashed and their pilots were killed in accidents, all three crashing in an area of about 100 yd (91 m). The first, a Meteor VIII piloted by Flight Lieutenant Gordon McDonald of 41 Squadron, crashed shortly after take-off, corkscrewing as pieces of structure fell from the aircraft. The aircraft hit a bungalow, killing the pilot. The jet wash of his flight leader was named as a possible cause. Within seconds of this accident two Mark IV Meteors of 600 Squadron, piloted by Sergeant Kenneth Clarkson and Squadron Leader Phillip Sandeman, both circling over the wreckage and preparing to land, collided at 2,000 ft (610 m) above the scene. Although Sandeman managed to bail out, he was killed when his parachute failed to open. Clarkson was killed in his aircraft. A week after this incident, another Meteor overshot the runway, narrowly missing passing cars. After these incidents, several residents stated they would be "selling up" and there were calls for traffic lights to be installed on the Bromley road for use during take-offs and landings.
- On 15 May 1977, during the annual International Air Fair, a Bell 206 helicopter was in a mid-air collision with a de Havilland Tiger Moth at the airport. The Tiger Moth landed but the Bell 206 crashed, killing all five on board.
- On 25 November 1978, a Socata Rallye 150 collided with a Cessna 150 over the airfield. The Rallye crashed near flying club buildings, killing the student pilot. The Cessna landed in a field and both occupants escaped with minor injuries. A report by the Air Accidents Investigation Branch concluded that the collision was caused by the failure of the Cessna pilot to see and give way to the other aircraft. The failure of the Rallye pilot to keep sufficient look-out was a contributory factor.
- On 21 September 1980 a Douglas B-26 Invader (registered N3710G) crashed during an air display. The aircraft was attempting to carry out a climbing roll in front of the crowd when the nose dropped sharply, and the aircraft continued rolling until it dropped vertically into a valley. The pilot and seven passengers were killed. The Civil Aviation Authority subsequently introduced rules preventing passengers from being carried during air displays.
- On 2 June 2001 a vintage de Havilland Vampire jet crashed during an air display, killing both pilots. The Vampire had been flying a display in tandem with a de Havilland Sea Vixen aircraft, and the likely cause of the accident was that the Vampire's flight path had been disrupted by wake turbulence from the larger aircraft.
- On 3 June 2001 a 1944 Bell P-63 Kingcobra crashed during a display, killing the pilot. The American Second World War fighter aircraft had been flying an unplanned sequence when the pilot lost control at the top of a climbing manoeuvre and was unable to recover from the resulting dive. The aircraft impacted the ground to the west of the runway in a steep nose-down attitude.
- On 30 March 2008 a Cessna Citation 501 aircraft crashed into a housing estate north of the airfield, killing all five people on board. Shortly after take-off from Biggin Hill, the pilot had reported severe engine vibration and was attempting to return to the airfield when the aircraft crashed. An investigation concluded that both engines had been shut down (possibly inadvertently) during the course of the short flight. Among those killed were Eurosport commentator and former Touring Car driver David Leslie and ex-Le Mans driver Richard Lloyd.
- On 24 November 2014, a Gulfstream III left the runway at 70 knots (130 km/h; 81 mph) during takeoff. There were no injuries. Investigators concluded that the pilot had misidentified lights marking the edge of the runway, believing them to denote the centreline. The aircraft, which was owned by American televangelist Creflo Dollar, sustained significant damage and was declared a hull loss.

== Cultural references ==
The airport features briefly in the 2006 film The Da Vinci Code, as a landing site for the main characters travelling to London.

== See also ==
- Airports of London
- List of airports in the United Kingdom and the British Crown Dependencies
