= Biggin Hill International Air Fair =

Discontinued civilian airshow in England

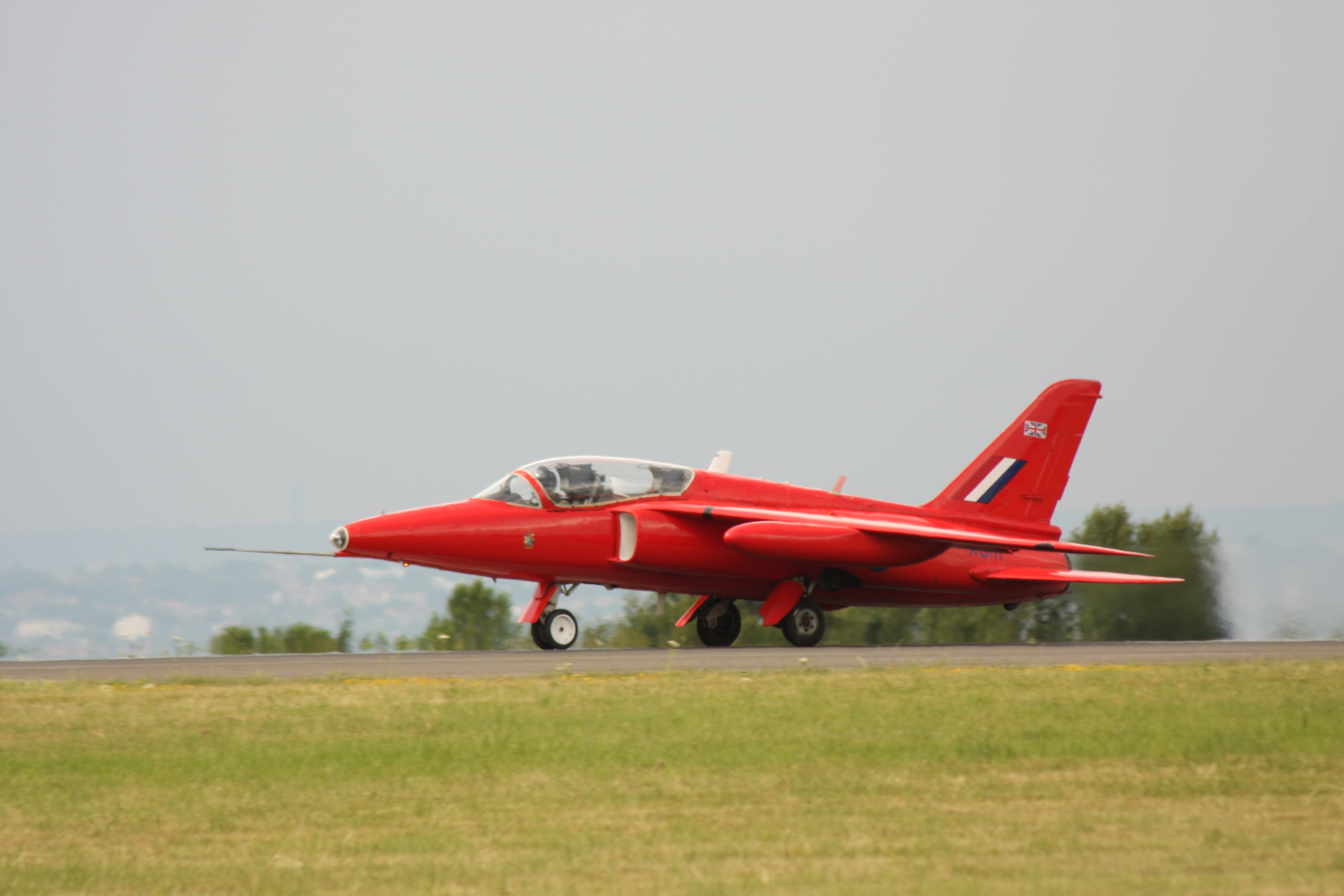
- Folland Gnat at 2009 show
- Status: Defunct
- Genre: Air show
- Dates: May 1963 - June 2010, June 2014 - August 2019
- Venue: London Biggin Hill Airport
- Location: London Borough of Bromley
- Country: United Kingdom

The Biggin Hill International Air Show, or Biggin Hill Air Fair, was one of the largest civilian airshows in the world and the largest privately organised air show in Europe. It ran once a year, usually near the end of June, at London Biggin Hill Airport, a former World War II RAF fighter station, from 1963 to 2010. It was succeeded by a smaller-scale air show event titled The Festival of Flight which was launched in June 2014 and ran until 2019.

== History ==
Squadron Leader Jock Maitland purchased a lease to run Biggin Hill Airport from Bromley Council in 1958, and commenced the first show in 1963. Jock Maitland had flown Sabres in conflict in Korea before retiring from RAF service. He started a small charter company, Maitland Air Charter which operated pleasure flights from Ramsgate Airport during 1959 and 1960, eventually using former RAF Percival Prentice aircraft refurbished and civilianised by Aviation Traders of Southend, a company started by Freddie Laker. Subsequently, Jock set up in business with a local builder to form Maitland Drewery Aviation and operated Vickers Viscount aircraft. Drewery conceived the infamous steel Wendy House which once graced the Apron on Biggin Hill Airport. The council privatised the airport in 1988 and it was bought by Biggin Hill Airport Ltd in 1994, who agreed a 25-year contract for the air fair.

In 2010 Biggin Hill Airport Ltd, the airfield leaseholders, cancelled the licence to run the air fair after 47 years, three years before it was due to end.

On Saturday 14 June 2014, the air fair was revived with a new smaller-scale format entitled The Festival of Flight. The proposed annual one-day event was limited to 15,000 spectators and was meant to portray Biggin Hill as both a site of historical value and as a modern thriving business airport. The main attraction of the show was a display from the Red Arrows who were celebrating their 50th Display year - Biggin Hill was notable for being the site of the first public display for the aerobatic display team in the UK back in 1965. A second Festival of Flight took place in June 2015, with a third held in June 2016.

From 2017 (the 100th anniversary of the RFC starting to use the airfield), the event took place over two days in August. The final Festival of Flight event was held in 2019.

In 2020, instead of a Festival of Flight (which could not have been held owing to significant infrastructure projects taking place at the airport), it was planned that a public event would be held on 10 August entitled "The Hardest Day", to commemorate the 80th anniversary of the Battle of Britain. However, owing to the COVID-19 pandemic, this event was cancelled.

== Airfair Radio ==
Airfair Radio was a Restricted Service Broadcaster radio station which covered the Air Fair from 1989 until 2006. It broadcast locally for between three and seven days each year on the FM band and worldwide via the internet. Airfair Radio broadcast live from the airfield 24 hours of the day, with programmes of commentary, music, interviews, phone-in competitions, local current affairs and dedications. Some of the calls received were relayed over the airwaves via phone–in equipment. Calls to the studio often numbered in excess of 200 a day.

Running a radio station from the middle of an airfield posed some unusual challenges. Electrical power came from a generator, accommodation was expensive and costs were high for a temporary telephone line. The station was paid for by spot advertising and sponsorship.

Airfair Radio first began broadcasting in 1989 on FM. For many years it broadcast on AM; however, for the last six years of transmission from Biggin Hill, FM was the preferred method of delivery. The broadcasts were simulcast over the internet, allowing programmes to be heard worldwide.

The station was operated by volunteers, many of whom worked in the broadcasting and communications industries; this allowed it to draw on a variety of experience from associated fields.

Its commentators were pilots, with many years of experience under their belts; the station's senior commentator, Ian Marshall, was a Sony Award-winning broadcaster. Many of its presenters and producers have gone on to develop successful broadcasting careers. Among them: Sam Matterface, who worked at the south-coast radio station 107.4 The Quay, where he presented the breakfast show and a variety of sports related programmes from 2001 to 2007, then moving on to presenting on Sky Sports News in July 2007, before leaving in late 2010. He is now the chief football commentator for TalkSport, and ITV Sport, and is the commentator for ITV's Dancing on Ice; Harvey Cook, News reader and writer, continuity announcer for BBC Radio 5Live, 6Music and Radio 2; Paul Stafford, who has a daily radio programme in Australia, and Fiona Goldman, whose credits include radio presenter for the British Forces Broadcasting Services, features reporter for BBC Radio 4, newsreader for BBC World Service and announcer for ITV and SKY. She is also a voice actress for TV and radio commercials and works internationally as a narrator for corporate films, books and documentaries. Other members of the team have pursued careers as producers for both BBC and Independent Radio stations, and in broadcast television.

Although AirFair Radio first started broadcasting in 1989, its volunteer team had been involved in local broadcasting for many years previously. Under the banner of SouthEast Radio, the group organised local RSL stations for a number of organisations, including: RoundTable Radio for Farnborough Round Table and Petts Wood Round Table, and Bromley Carnival Radio for The Bromley Carnival Association. Their first venture into local broadcasting was for coverage of the Orpington Town Carnival in 1984.

The establishment of the Special Events Group was born of a need to raise money in support of Orpington Hospital Radio Service, which had been providing programmes for Orpington Hospital since 1980, and later also for Farnborough hospital. It also provided opportunities for many keen volunteers to acquire skills useful for pursuing careers as producers, presenters, voice-over artists and engineers which, as mentioned above, served many of them well in helping them establish careers in broadcasting.
