= South London Coroner's Court =

Coordinates: 51.3713°N 0.0997°W

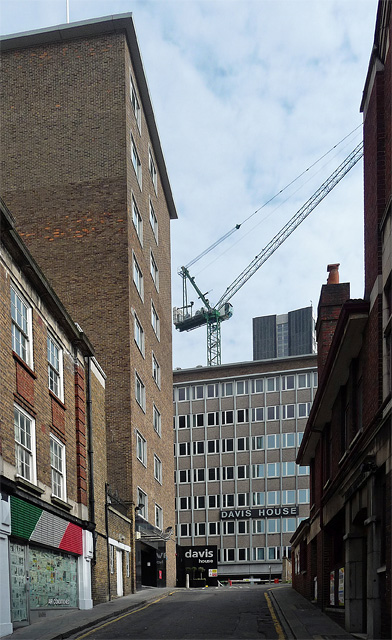
Davis House

The Coroner's Court for South London is located on the 2nd Floor of Davis House in Croydon. The offices of the Coroner for South London are located at the same address. The court covers the London Boroughs of Bexley, Bromley, Croydon and Sutton.
