= Aviation regulations =

Regulations for aeronautical operations

Most country's administrations have regulatory authorities devoted to producing and publishing regulations for aeronautical operations.

== Countries, organizations and publications ==
Australia
published as Civil Aviation Safety Regulations, and produced by Civil Aviation Safety Authority.
Canada
published as Canadian Aviation Regulations, and produced by Transport Canada.
United States
published as Federal Aviation Regulations, and produced by the Federal Aviation Administration.
European Union
the regulations are produced by the European Aviation Safety Agency (EASA).

Topic	EASA Part / Regulation	Scope / Notes
Pilot Licensing	Part-FCL	Requirements for pilot licensing, ratings, and medical certificates.
Aircraft Airworthiness Certification	Part-21	Aircraft type certification, production, and modifications.
Aircraft Maintenance & Personnel Licensing	Part-66 / Part-145	Maintenance rules, licensing of maintenance personnel, and approved maintenance organizations.
General Operations (All Aircraft)	Part-OPS / Part-NCC	General operating rules for commercial and non-commercial operations.
Commercial Air Transport (Airlines)	Part-OPS / Part-CAT	Operational requirements for airlines, including operational control and crew requirements.
Specialized Operations	Part-SPO	Rules for aerial work, agricultural operations, and other specialized missions.
Flight Crew Duty & Rest	Part-OPS / Flight Time Limitations	Duty and rest time limitations to prevent pilot fatigue.
Aircraft Noise & Environmental Standards	Part-36	Aircraft noise certification and environmental emissions rules.
Unmanned Aircraft / Drones	Part-UAS	Rules for UAS/drone operations, pilot competency, and airspace integration.
Safety Management / Incident Reporting	Part-ARO / Part-ORO	Safety management systems, occurrence reporting, and oversight of organizations.

Brazil
published as Regulamento Brasileiro da Aviação Civil (RBAC), and produced by the National Civil Aviation Agency of Brazil.

Topic	RBAC / ANAC Part / Subpart	Scope / Notes
Pilot Licensing	Part 61	Requirements for pilot licensing, ratings, and medical certificates.
Aircraft Airworthiness Certification	Part 21	Aircraft type certification, production, and modifications.
Aircraft Maintenance & Personnel Licensing	Part 66 / Part 145	Maintenance rules, licensing of maintenance personnel, approved maintenance organizations.
General Operations (All Aircraft)	Part 91	General operating and flight rules applicable to all aircraft.
Commercial Air Transport (Airlines)	Part 121	Airline operations, operational control, and crew requirements.
Regional / Commuter Operations	Part 135	Small commercial operators, commuter airlines, and charter operations.
Flight Crew Duty & Rest	Part 117	Duty and rest time limitations for pilots to prevent fatigue.
Aircraft Noise & Environmental Standards	Part 36	Aircraft noise certification and environmental emissions rules.
Unmanned Aircraft / Drones	Part 107	Rules for small UAS/drone operation, certification, and pilot competency.
Safety Management / Incident Reporting	Part 119 / Part 120	Safety management systems and mandatory occurrence reporting.

== See also ==
- Aviation law
- Aviation safety
