= Royal Observer Corps =

British military unit

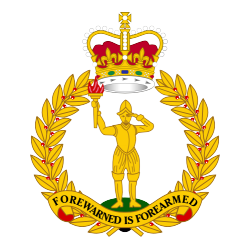
- Badge of the ROC
- Active: 1925–1996
- Country: United Kingdom
- Branch: Royal Air Force
- Type: Civil defence
- Role: Aircraft recognition and reporting (1925–1955); Nuclear fallout warning service (1955–1996)
- Size: June 1941 : c. 27,900 personnel 1991: c. 10,500
- Part of: RAF Strike Command; UKWMO
- Headquarters: RAF Bentley Priory
- Motto: Forewarned is Forearmed (Praemonitus praemunitus)
- March: Skywatch march
- Anniversaries: 29 October
- Engagements: Second World War (1939–1945); Cold War (1947–1991)
- Decorations: Observer Corps awarded Royal title by King George VI for meritorious service, (Battle of Britain).

Commanders
- Last Air Commodore-in-Chief ROC: Queen Elizabeth II
- 24th and last Commandant ROC: Air Commodore Martin Widdowson (1995–1996)
- Notable commanders: Air Commodore Drummond Warrington-Morris CB CMG OBE AFC RAF (1936–1942) * Air Commodore 5th Earl of Bandon GBE CB CVO DSO RAF (1945–1949) * Air Commodore John Howe CB CBE AFC RAF (1977–1981) * Air Commodore George Black CB OBE AFC RAF (1983–1984) * Air Commodore Clifford Spink CB CBE FCMI FRAeS RAF (1993–1995)

Insignia
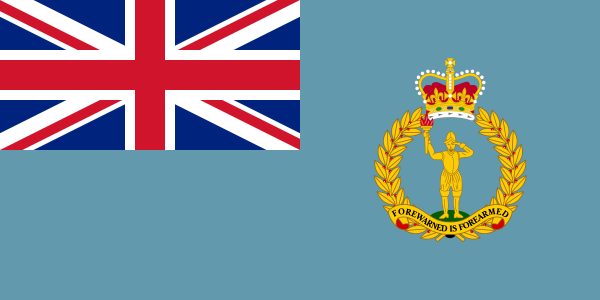
- Ensign

- Royal Banner

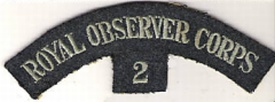
- Shoulder title (Group number)

- Stable belt colours

The Royal Observer Corps (ROC) was a civil defence organisation originally intended for the visual detection, identification, tracking and reporting of aircraft over Great Britain. It operated in the United Kingdom between 29 October 1925 and 31 December 1995, when the Corps' civilian volunteers were stood down (ROC headquarters staff at RAF Bentley Priory stood down on 31 March 1996). Composed mainly of civilian spare-time volunteers, ROC personnel wore a Royal Air Force (RAF) style uniform and latterly came under the administrative control of RAF Strike Command and the operational control of the Home Office. Civilian volunteers were trained and administered by a small cadre of professional full-time officers under the command of the Commandant Royal Observer Corps; latterly a serving RAF Air Commodore. Despite its long association with the RAF, the ROC was not part of the British Armed Forces.

== Overview ==
In 1925, following a Defence Committee initiative undertaken the previous year, the formation of an RAF command concerning the Air Defence of Great Britain led to the provision of a Raid Reporting System, itself delegated to a sub-committee consisting of representatives from the Air Ministry, Home Office and the General Post Office. This Raid Reporting System was to provide for the visual detection, identification, tracking and reporting of aircraft over Great Britain, and was eventually to become known as the Observer Corps. The Observer Corps was subsequently awarded the title Royal by His Majesty King George VI in April 1941, in recognition of the meritorious service carried out by Observer Corps personnel throughout the Battle of Britain.

Throughout the remainder of the Second World War, the ROC continued to complement and at times replace the Chain Home defensive radar system by undertaking an inland aircraft tracking and reporting function, while Chain Home provided a predominantly coastal, long-range tracking and reporting system. With the advent of the Cold War, the ROC continued in its primary role of aircraft recognition and reporting, and in 1955 was allocated the additional task of detecting and reporting nuclear explosions and associated fall-out. By 1965, thanks to advances in (radar) technology, most roles and responsibilities relating to aircraft recognition and raid reporting had been withdrawn and the ROC assumed the role of field force for the United Kingdom Warning and Monitoring Organisation (UKWMO); a role which the ROC continued until the early 1990s and the cessation of the Cold War.

By the late 1980s the ROC comprised approximately 10,500 civilian spare-time volunteers. At HQROC (RAF Bentley Priory), over a dozen full-time secretarial, clerical and other administrative staff were present. Each of the five Area HQs were staffed by a clerical officer and a typist, and each of the 25 Group HQs were staffed by a clerical officer, typist and handyperson. (Many MoD civilian support staff were also civilian spare-time volunteers.)

Following the UK Government's Options for Change armed forces defence spending review in 1990, the vast majority of the civilian spare-time volunteers were stood down on 30 September 1991, with the remainder being stood down on 31 December 1995. The closure of HQROC on 31 March 1996 and redeployment of those few remaining HQROC staff marked the disbandment of the ROC after over 70 years of service.

== First World War ==
The Royal Observer Corps can trace its roots to the First World War and the requirement for a warning system to bolster UK defences, predominantly over south-east England, against bombing raids by Zeppelin airships of the German Luftstreitkräfte. A system of observation posts and observers was organised, with a network of approximately 200 posts established in strategic areas. Initially these posts were manned by British Army personnel, who were in turn replaced by Special (Police) Constables, and posts were coordinated on an area basis with telephone communications provided between themselves and their associated anti-aircraft defences.

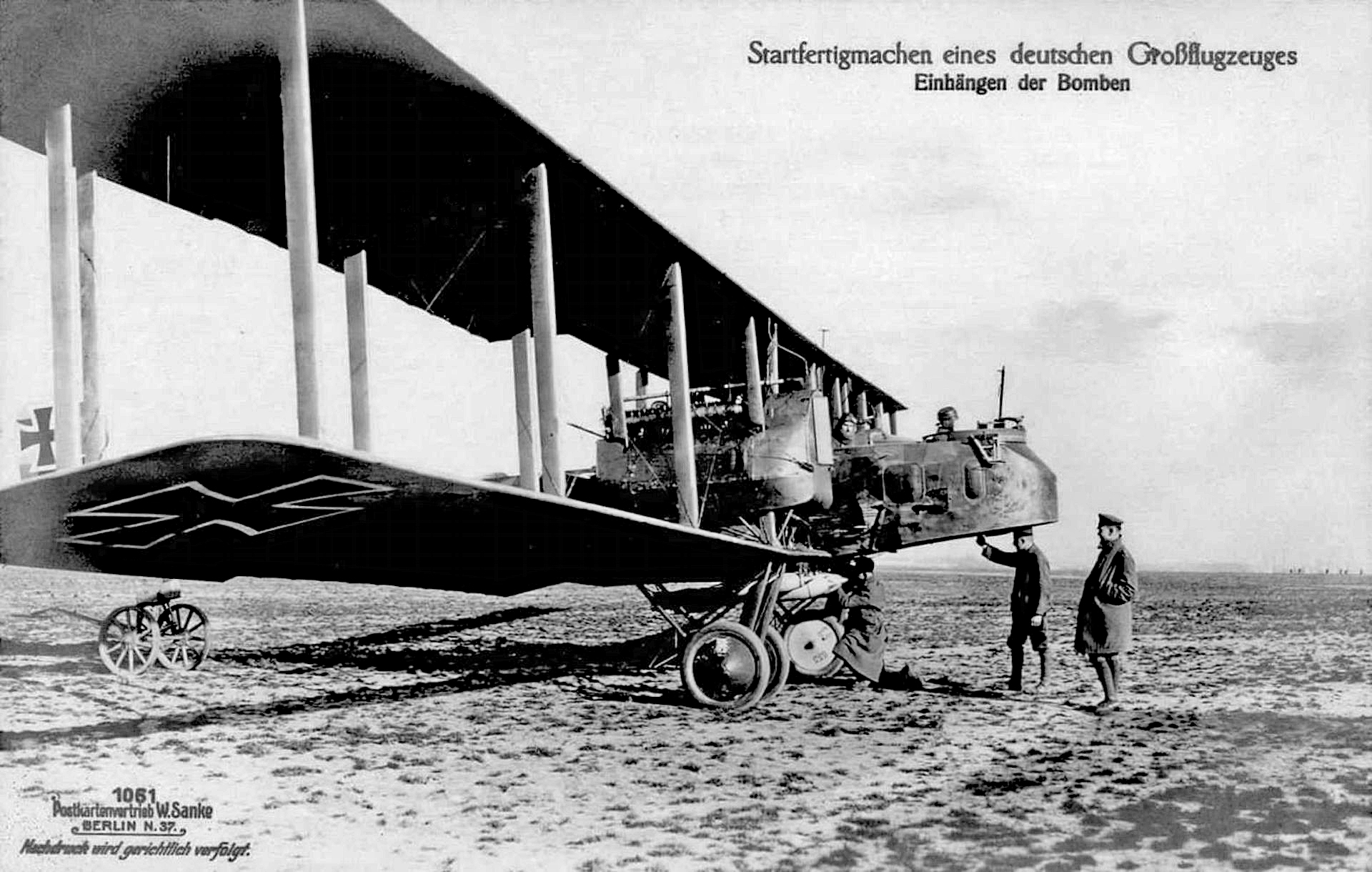
A Luftstreitkräfte Gotha G.V.

In 1917 Germany began to deploy increasing numbers of fixed-wing bombers, with the result that the number of airship raids decreased rapidly in favour of raids by such aircraft. In response to this new threat, Major General Edward Bailey Ashmore, a Royal Flying Corps pilot who later commanded an artillery division in Belgium, was appointed to devise an improved system of detection, communication and control. The system, called the Metropolitan Observation Service, encompassed the London Air Defence Area and later extended eastwards towards the Kentish and Essex coasts of the English Channel.

The Metropolitan Observation Service met with some success towards the end of the First World War and, although not fully operational until late 1918, (the last German bombing raid having taken place on 19/20 May 1918, when 38 Gotha and 3 Giant aircraft bombed London and surrounding districts), the lessons learned were to prove invaluable for future developments in the fields of aircraft recognition and raid reporting.

Types of air raid undertaken by the Luftstreitkräfte over the UK during World War I
Year	Aeroplanes	Airships	Deaths
1914	3	0	0
1915	4	42	186
1916	28	126	302
1917	341	30	650
1918	59	10	178

== Interwar period ==
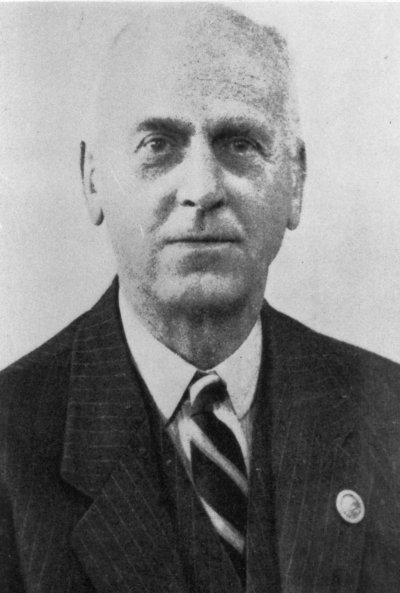
Air Commodore E A D Masterman, first Commandant of the Observer Corps, (wearing Observer Corps tie and lapel badge).

By the end of 1920, the observation-post networks and their associated anti-aircraft hardware had been decommissioned, and in 1922 the responsibility for air defence was transferred from the War Office (responsible for the army) to the Air Ministry.

Following this transfer, Major General Ashmore, who had been responsible for air defence during the First World War, reported to a new Air Raid Precautions (ARP) committee, established in January 1924. In areas surrounding Romney Marsh and the Weald a series of trials were undertaken to develop a Raid Reporting System which would employ an optimum arrangement of observation posts and associated control-centres. During 1925 these trials were further extended to cover parts of the counties of Essex and Hampshire, and by October a proven modus operandi had been developed for a new organisation to be known as the Observer Corps, which was established on 29 October 1925.

Within a year four groups operated in South East England, covering much of Kent, Sussex, Hampshire and Essex, with the intention that a total of eighteen groups would cover the whole of Great Britain. The system required cooperation between and the participation of the RAF, the army, the British police forces and the General Post Office (GPO). (The GPO at that time operated Britain's national telecommunications system.) In January 1926 county police constabularies recruited observers as special constables, and each observation post was manned by a sergeant and six special constables. Recruits were spare-time volunteers who received neither pay, uniform, nor allowances. Individual volunteers purchased the only distinguishing insignia, Observer Corps lapel badges, at their own expense.

In 1929 the control of the Observer Corps passed from the county police forces to the Air Ministry, although Chief Constables retained responsibility for personnel and recruitment matters. 1 March 1929 saw the establishment of the new Headquarters of the Observer Corps at Hillingdon House, RAF Uxbridge in the west of London, and Air Commodore Edward A D Masterman was appointed as the first commandant of the Observer Corps. Masterman remained the commandant of the ROC until his retirement on 1 March 1936, and was succeeded by Air Commodore Alfred Warrington-Morris, who would lead the Observer Corps through the critical period during the Second World War which saw the RAF emerge bruised but victorious following the Battle of Britain of 1940.

During the 1930s the number of groups increased until by 1936, England had a full coverage of observation posts south-east of a line between Flamborough Head in Yorkshire and Poole Harbour in Dorset. In 1936 the Headquarters of the Observer Corps relocated from RAF Uxbridge to RAF Bentley Priory in north-west London. By 1939 a system of observation posts covering practically the whole of Great Britain was able to be integrated fully into the Dowding system of air defense, with the western parts of Wales and Scotland together with England's West Country being incorporated during 1940, (The final group, Portree in the Hebrides, forming in 1941).

== Second World War ==
=== Preparation ===
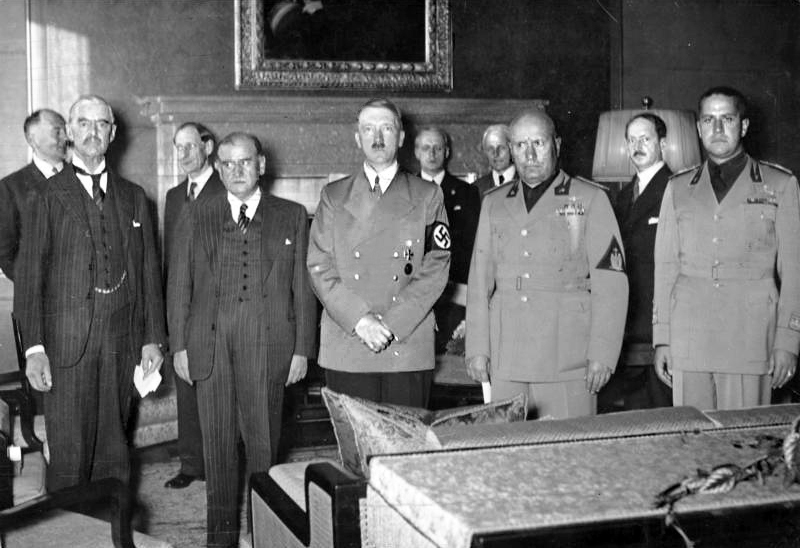
The signatories to the Munich Agreement

At the end of September 1938 the political crisis which culminated in the Munich Agreement had led to the Observer Corps being mobilised for a week. This highlighted organisational and technical shortcomings, and provided the impetus for the development of solutions to resolve these. A series of exercises held throughout 1939 provided opportunities for the fine tuning of improvements made to command and control functions.

At this time the only uniform items issued to Observer Corps personnel were steel helmets bearing the stencilled letters 'O C', together with blue/white (vertically striped) armbands bearing the same. Both items of equipment were similar in style to those issued to members of the civil defence emergency services, including the Auxiliary Fire Service ('AFS') and Air Raid Precautions ('ARP'). The initial batch of helmets issued to Observer Corps members were the same as those issued to Police forces; black in colour with the word 'POLICE' stencilled in white. (This led some Observer Corps members to simply scratch off the stencilled letters P, L, I, and E, to leave letters O and C remaining as one can see in the photograph below).

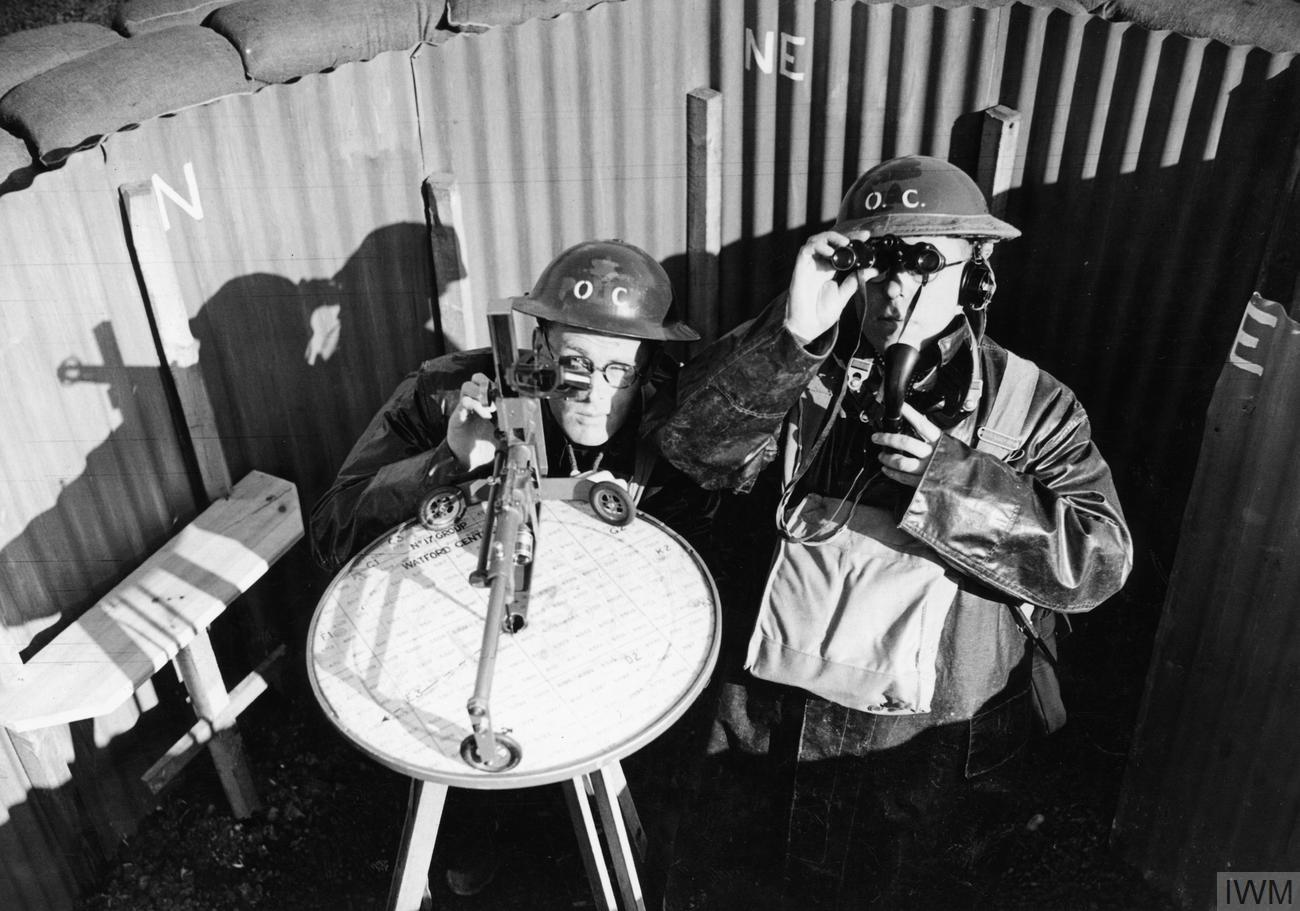
Observation post made from 'wriggly tin'.

High quality Royal Navy-issue binoculars were issued to observers, whose observation posts often consisted of a wooden garden shed located next to a telegraph pole, this arrangement enabling a telecommunications link to be established with a control centre, often via a manual switchboard at local telephone exchange. These 'garden shed' style observation posts were eventually replaced by more substantial brick structures, protected by sandbags, which due to their often having been constructed by Observer Corps personnel themselves resulting in no two observation posts being identical.

Observation posts were located in open playing fields, hilltops or cliff edges and, particularly in urban areas, on the rooftops of public buildings and factories. Purpose-built observation posts introduced later were usually two-storey structures, constructed of brick or concrete, with an open-topped observation platform situated above a small crew rest area.

=== Early days of the war ===
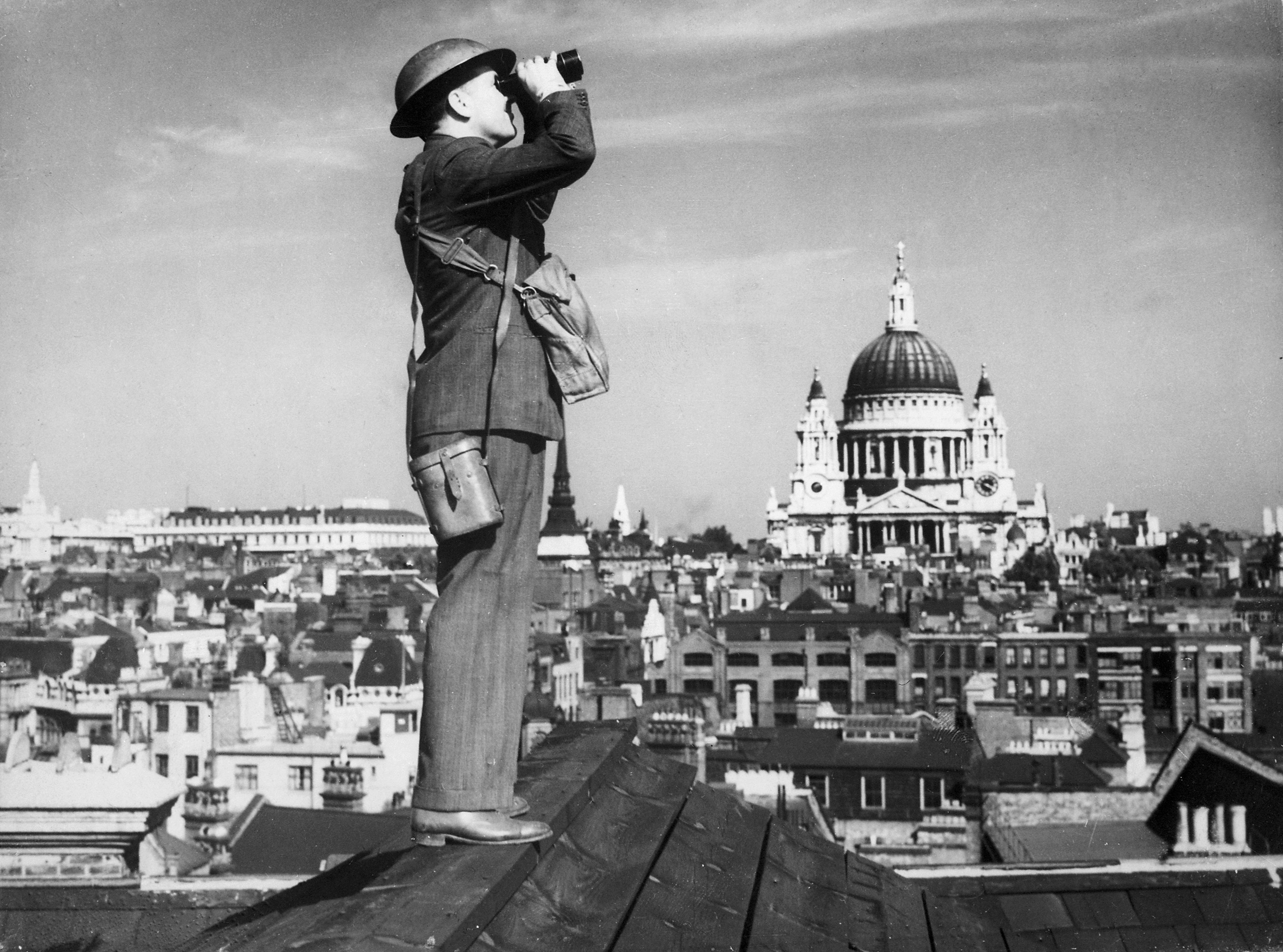
Observer Corps Spotter on a London rooftop.

On 24 August 1939 Chief Constables issued Mobilisation Notices to all members of the Observer Corps, with war being declared just ten days afterwards. From 3 September 1939, observation posts and control centres would be manned continuously until 12 May 1945, four days after VE Day.

The first months of the Second World War were known as the Phoney War, with little significant enemy aircraft activity over Great Britain. The Battle of Dunkirk commenced at the end of May 1940, with Allied troops cut off in retreat by the German Army in north-east France, resulting in the evacuation of British troops in Operation Dynamo. During this time the RAF lost a total of 944 aircraft, with half of these being fighter aircraft. Observer Corps posts in Kent and around the Thames estuary were able to play some part in plotting aircraft while they were over south east England. This was a useful period of exposure to war-time operations for Observer Corps personnel, and one which would provide invaluable experience.

Despite it being crucial that armed service personnel could correctly identify the various types of allied and German aircraft operating in the skies above and around Great Britain, in 1939 aircraft recognition was not yet the highly developed skill it was to become in the Observer Corps. Other armed services regarded accurate aircraft identification as being almost impossible; observers, however, realised that skills in this area were deficient, and the profile of aircraft recognition was raised within the ranks of the Observer Corps. Aircraft recognition training material, consisting of aircraft silhouettes and other data, was introduced almost entirely under the auspices of the unofficial Observer Corps Club. Only much later did this skill obtain official recognition, with the result that it eventually spread throughout the armed forces.

=== Battle of Britain ===
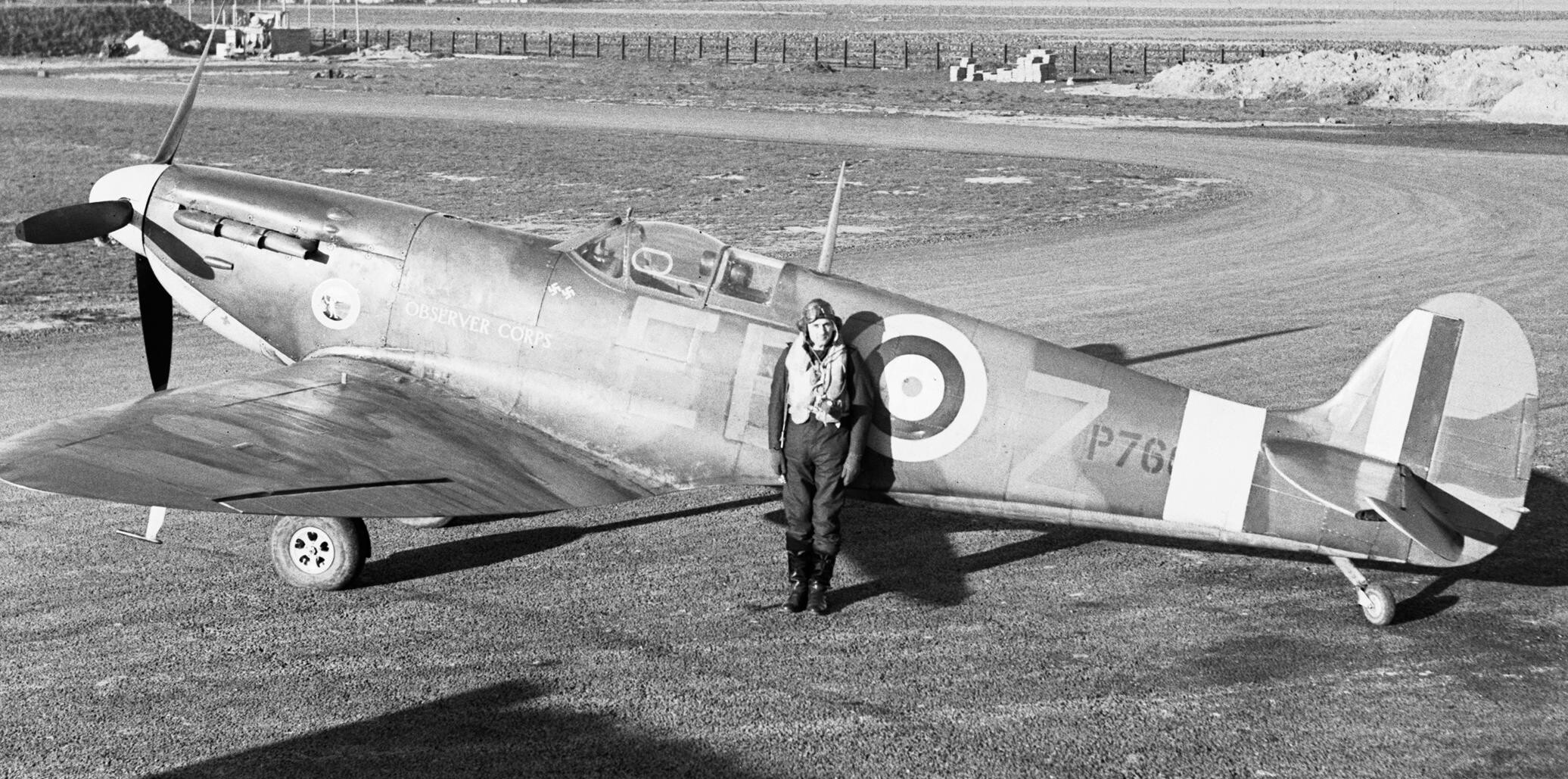
Spitfire IIA "Observer Corps" at RAF Hornchurch, 1940. Swastika kill markings denote two of Sqn Ldr Donald Finlay's four confirmed (individual) enemy destroyed were achieved in this aircraft.

After the Fall of France, the goal of Germany was to achieve air superiority over Great Britain by destroying RAF fighters, both in the air and on the ground, and by bombing aircraft manufacturing facilities. Winning the Battle of Britain, as it became known, was Germany's prerequisite in preparation for the invasion of Britain; Operation Sea Lion.

The British Chain Home radar defence system was able to warn of enemy aircraft approaching the British coast, but once having crossed the coastline the Observer Corps provided the only means of tracking their position. During the period from July to October 1940, the Observer Corps was at full stretch operating 24 hours a day, 7 days a week, plotting enemy aircraft and passing this essential information to RAF Fighter Command Groups and Sector Controls. (ROC personnel were deployed in two specific roles: Those in Class A were required to undertake 56 hours duty per week, while Class B personnel undertook up to 24 hours duty per week). The Battle of Britain also saw the introduction of the Blitz campaign and the shift of German bombing from airfields to cities. Again, the Observer Corps provided vital information which enabled timely air-raid warnings to be issued, thereby saving countless lives.

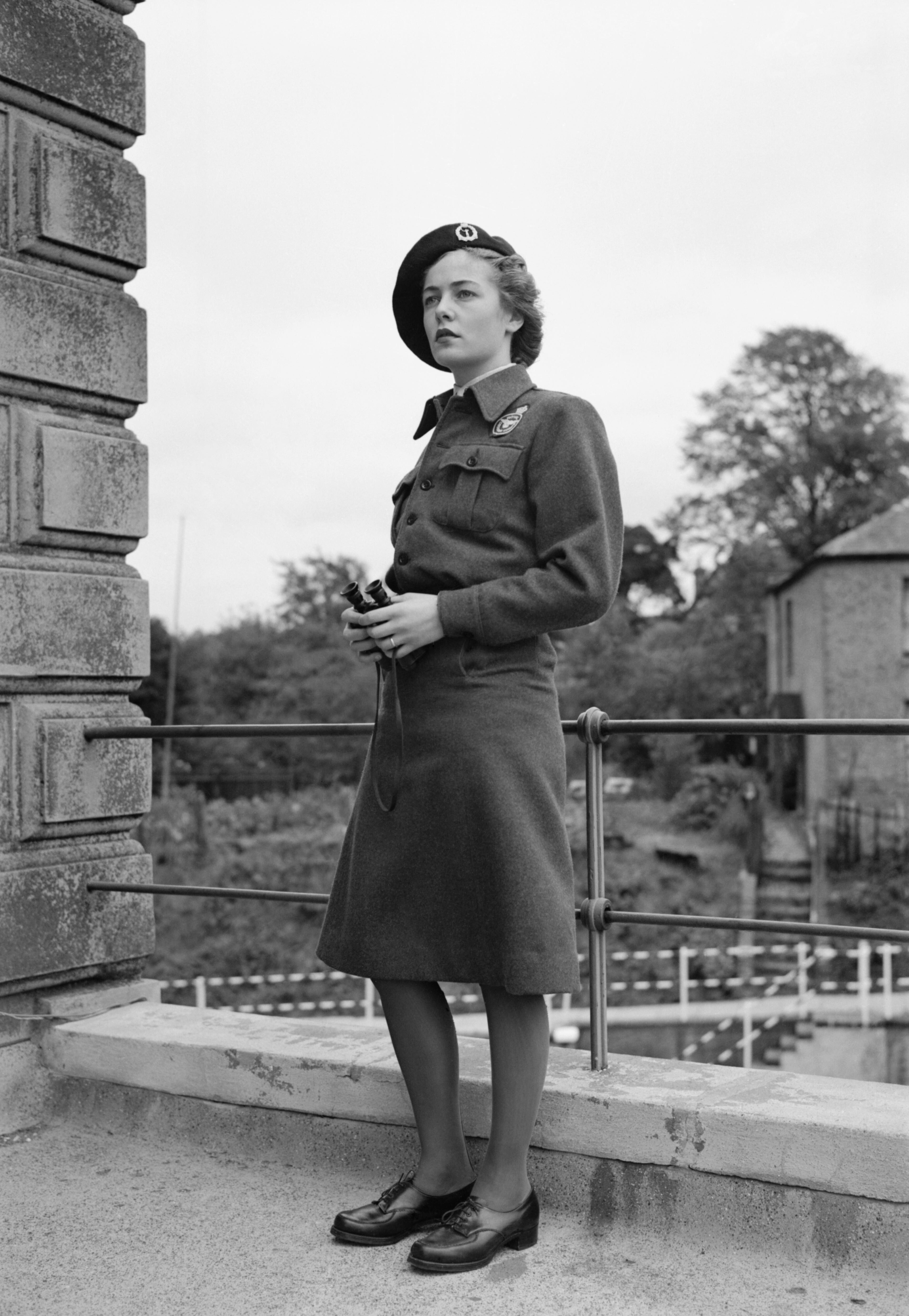
1941 saw the award of the title Royal, the issue of RAF style uniform and the recruitment of women.

As a result of their role during the Battle of Britain, in April 1941 the Observer Corps was granted the title Royal by King George VI, and the Royal Observer Corps (ROC) became a uniformed civil defence organisation administered by RAF Fighter Command.

Also during that same year, in a change from the policy of the Observer Corps, the ROC undertook to recruit women personnel for the first time. Initially, the only uniforms provided were RAF overalls, (boiler suits), with an ROC breast badge, commonly referred to as the "soup plate" because of its shape and size. Standard issue RAF No.2 Battledress uniforms were issued in a rolling programme over the next two years.

The Blitz itself continued until early in the summer of 1941 and bombing continued, albeit on a reduced scale, until March 1945. The Observer Corps formed the cornerstone of Air Marshal Hugh Dowding's air defence system, who stated in a despatch following the Battle of Britain that:

at this time they (the Observer Corps) constituted the whole means of tracking enemy raids once they had crossed the coastline. Their work throughout was quite invaluable. Without it the air-raid warning systems could not have been operated and inland interceptions would rarely have been made.

For the remainder of the war, the ROC provided an essential part of Great Britain's air defences.

=== Seaborne Observers ===
Seaborne Observers were seconded to allied DEMS and US Navy vessels for the D-Day landings. DEMS Empire Broadsword, (above), was mined and sunk off Normandy; Aircraft Identifier W. J. Salter listed as Missing Presumed Killed.

In 1944, during preparations for the invasion of France, (Operation Overlord), a request for volunteers from within the ranks of the ROC produced 1,094 highly qualified candidates, from which 796 were selected to perform aircraft recognition duties as Seaborne Observers.

These Seaborne Observers, under the command of Group Commandant C.G. Cooke, undertook specialist training at the Royal Bath Hotel, Bournemouth, prior to being temporarily seconded to the Royal Navy with the rank of Petty Officer (Aircraft Identifier). The Seaborne Observers continued to wear their ROC uniform, but in addition wore a "SEABORNE" shoulder flash and Royal Navy brassard bearing the letters "RN". During the D-day landings, two Seaborne Observers were allocated to all participating United States Navy vessels and Defensively Equipped Merchant Ships. The Seaborne Observers assumed control of each ship's anti aircraft batteries with the intention of reducing the previously high incidence of friendly fire (collateral damage) between allied vessels and allied aircraft.

The success of the Seaborne Observers in undertaking this role can be measured by a signal sent from Wing Commander P.B. Lucas, Air Staff Officer, who stated that:

The general impression amongst the Spitfire wings, covering our land and naval forces over and off the beach-head, appears to be that in the majority of cases the fire has come from British Navy warships and not from the merchant ships. Indeed, I personally have yet to hear a single pilot report that a merchant vessel had opened fire on him

During Operation Overlord a total of two Seaborne Observers lost their lives, several more were injured and twenty two survived their ships being sunk. In addition, ten Seaborne Observers were mentioned in despatches. The deployment of Seaborne Observers was regarded as an unqualified success and in recognition of their contribution to the success of the landings, King George Vl approved the permanent wearing of the SEABORNE shoulder flash on the ROC uniforms of all those individuals who had taken part. Following the successful invasion of Normandy, Air Chief Marshal Trafford Leigh-Mallory sent a signal for circulation to all ROC personnel:

I have read reports from both pilots and naval officers regarding the Seaborne volunteers on board merchant vessels during recent operations. All reports agree that the Seaborne volunteers have more than fulfilled their duties and have undoubtedly saved many of our aircraft from being engaged by our ships guns. I should be grateful if you would please convey to all ranks of the Royal Observer Corps, and in particular to the Seaborne observers themselves, how grateful I, and all pilots in the Allied Expeditionary Air Force, are for their assistance, which has contributed in no small measure to the safety of our own aircraft, and also to the efficient protection of the ships at sea. The work of the Royal Observer Corps is quite often unjustly overlooked, and receives little recognition, and I therefore wish that the service they rendered on this occasion be as widely advertised as possible, and all units of the Air Defence of Great Britain are therefore to be informed of the success of this latest venture of the Royal Observer Corps.

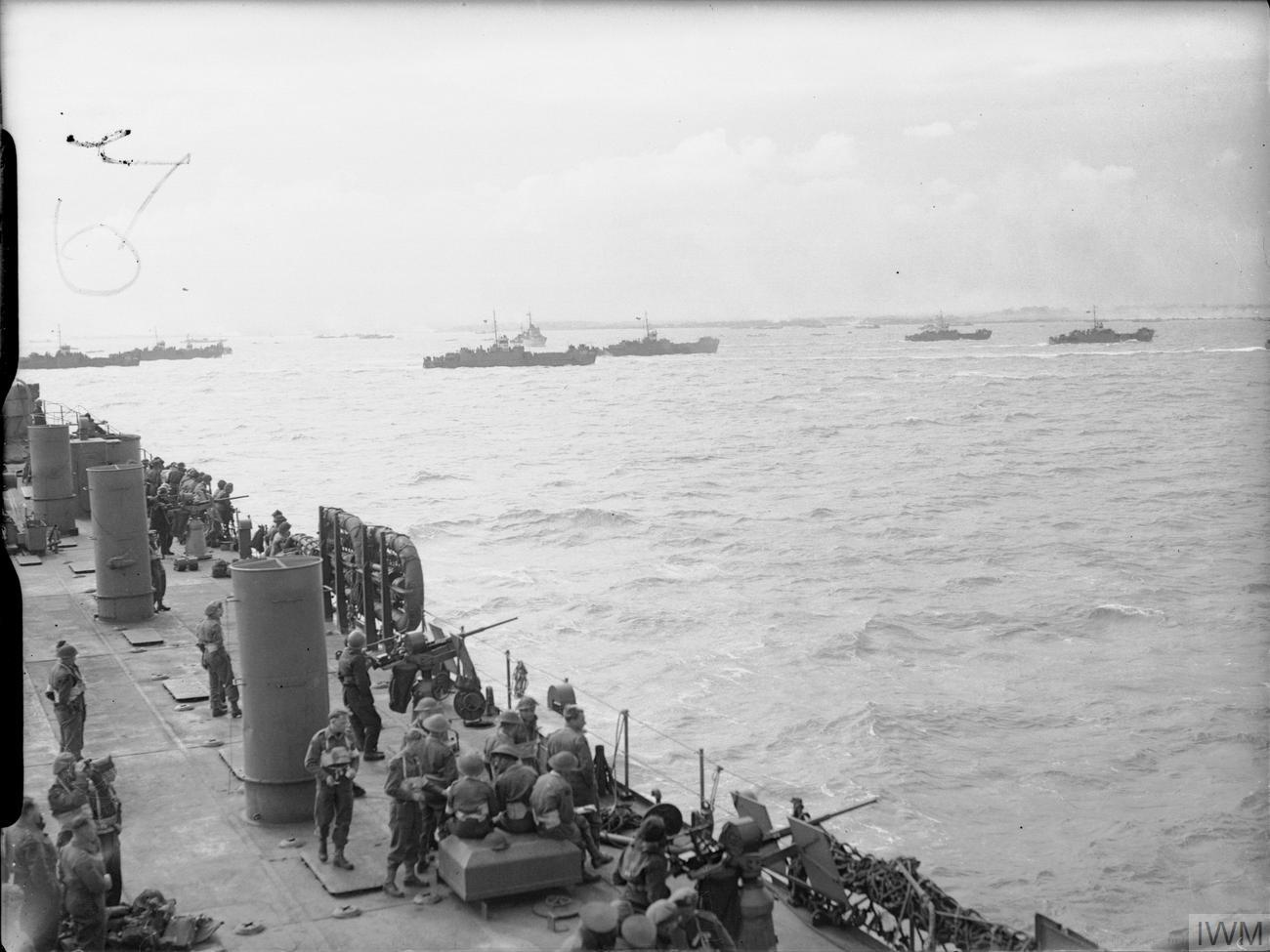
Seaborne Observers were "Lent to Safeguard" several USN vessels.

The Seaborne Observers remain the only members of the ROC whose service during the Second World War entitles them to wear the HM Armed Forces Veteran's Badge, their qualifying for this resulting from the approximately ten-week period of secondment to the Royal Navy as Petty Officers. A Seaborne Observers' Association exists, with Air Vice Marshal George Black CB OBE AFC RAF (Rtd), a former Commandant ROC, acting as its Honorary President.

The ROC itself was never a component of HM Armed Forces; ROC members were non-combatants during wartime, with the exception of full-time officers who could be armed and legally classed as combatants. However, certain observation posts "in the firing line" (isolated posts in close proximity to the coasts of Sussex, Kent, Essex, Suffolk and Norfolk) were issued with two First World War–era rifles and 100 rounds of ammunition during 1940-1944 (the prospect of an invasion of Great Britain by German forces being discounted post-1944).

=== Flying bombs ===
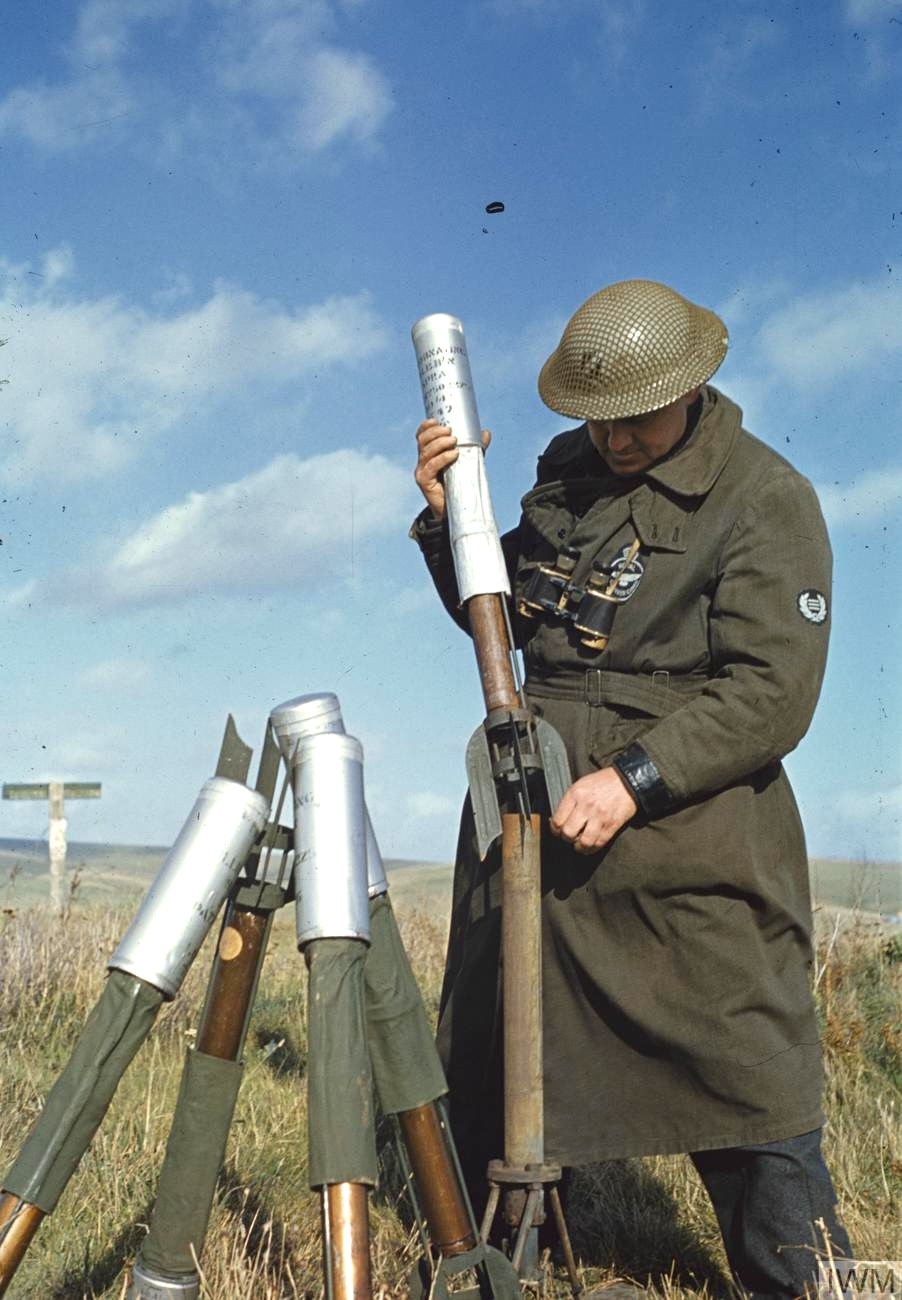
‘Snowflake’ rocket flares.

Intelligence reports detailing the threat posed by Germany's flying bombs resulted in the instigation of Operation Totter, whereby ROC posts would fire 'Snowflake' illuminating rocket flares in order to alert RAF fighters to the presence of V-1 flying bombs. Observers at the coastal post of Dymchurch, Kent, identified the very first of these weapons and within seconds of their report the defences were in action.

This new weapon gave the ROC much additional work, both at posts and control centres. RAF fighter controllers temporarily moved their radio equipment into the operations rooms of ROC control centres at Horsham and Maidstone in order to direct fighters to intercept V-1 flying bombs using information displayed on ROC plotting tables. Critics who had earlier claimed that the ROC would be unable to assist the new fast-flying Gloster Meteor jet aircraft were answered when these aircraft, on their first operational combat sorties to intercept V-1 flying bombs, were controlled entirely using ROC derived information. The optimism shown by the then Commandant ROC, Air Cdre Crerar, that the ROC would cope with this new and advanced technology was vindicated.

The first V-1 identified and logged was by ROC personnel E Woodward and A Wraight, on 13 June 1944, at Dymchurch, Kent. (The first sighting over London itself was credited to S Fenton of the ROC). Attacks by V1 flying bombs continued until 29 March, 1945, with the last being recorded at Woolmer Green, Hertfordshire.

=== Organisation and modus operandi ===
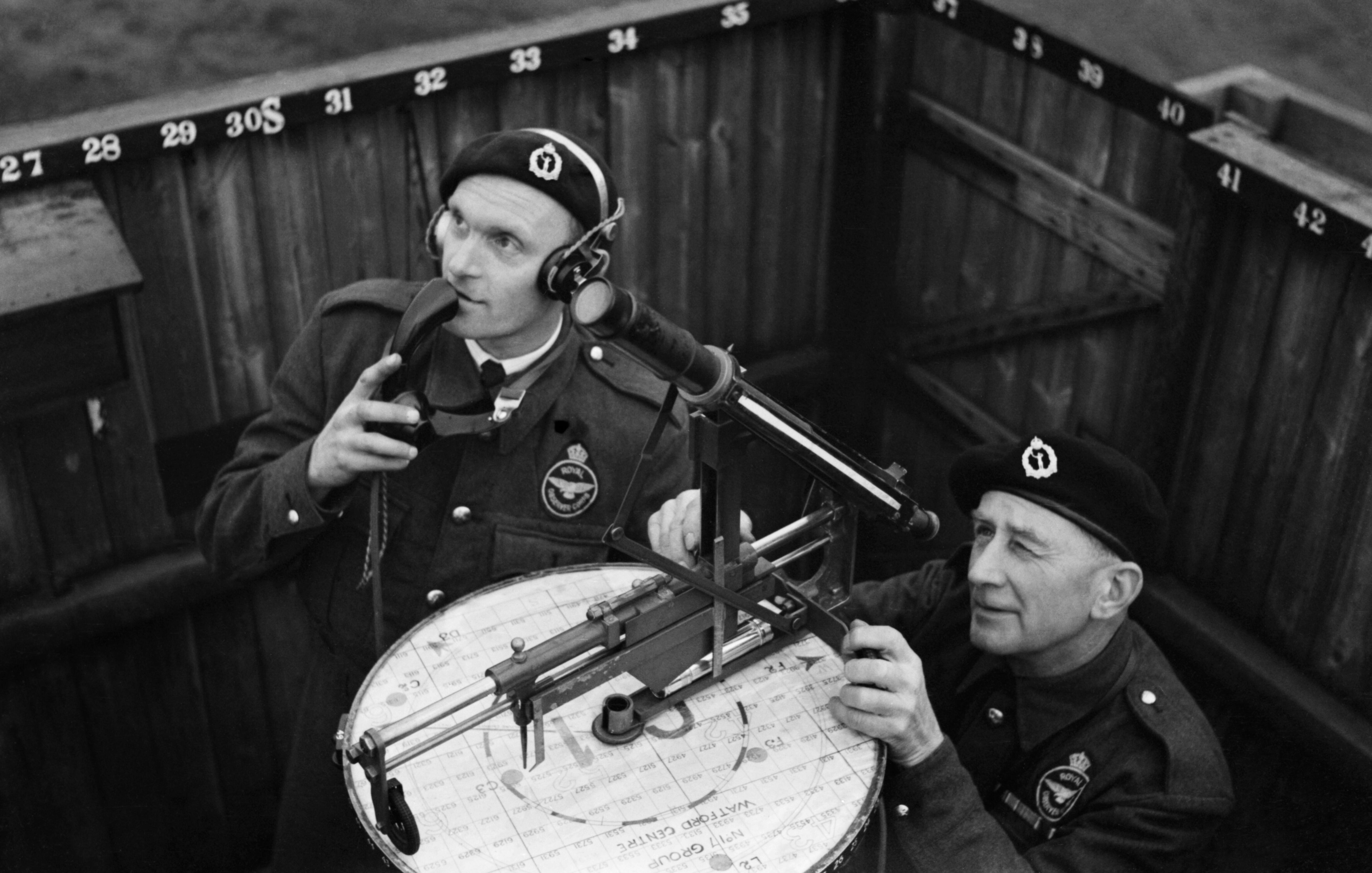
A Post Instrument plotter, with Mickelthwait height adjuster attachment, used to plot aircraft.

In order to monitor aircraft, Post observers used a simple but effective mechanical tracking device. Where the approximate height of an aircraft is known it becomes possible, by using a horizontal bearing and a vertical angle taken from a known point, to calculate the approximate position of that aircraft. Posts were equipped with a mechanical sighting Post Instrument plotter consisting of a sighting system over a map grid. After setting the instrument with the aircraft's approximate height, the observer would align a sighting bar with the aircraft. This bar was mechanically connected to a vertical pointer which would indicate the approximate position of the aircraft on the map grid. Post observers would report the map coordinates, height, time, sector clock colour code and number of aircraft for each sighting to the aircraft Plotters located at their ROC Group control Centre.

The headquarters of each ROC Group operated from a control Centre, responsible for and controlled between 30 and 40 observation Posts, each of which would be some 10 km to 20 km from its neighbour. By 1945 there were 39 centres covering Great Britain, controlling in total more than 1,500 posts. (The ROC did not operate in Northern Ireland until 1954).

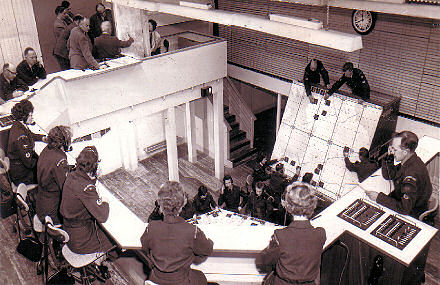
A Centre 'Ops Room': Tellers on a balcony above a plotting table and long-range handover board. A Leading Observer acts as Post Controller.

Positioned around a large table map, plotters would wear headsets to enable a constant communications link to be maintained with their allocated Cluster of posts, usually three in number. The plotting table consisted of a large map with grid squares and posts being marked. Counters were placed on the map at the reported aircraft's position, each counter indicating the height and number of aircraft, and a colour-coded system was used to indicated the time of observation in 5-minute segments determined by reference to a sector clock. The table was surrounded by plotters, responsible for communicating with their allocated cluster of posts. Over time the track of aircraft could be traced, with the sector clock system of colour-coding enabling the extrapolation of tracks and the removal of time expired (historical) data. From 1942, long-range boards were introduced into centre operations rooms, with Tellers communicating with neighbouring ROC groups in order to handover details of inbound and outbound aircraft tracks as they were plotted on this map.

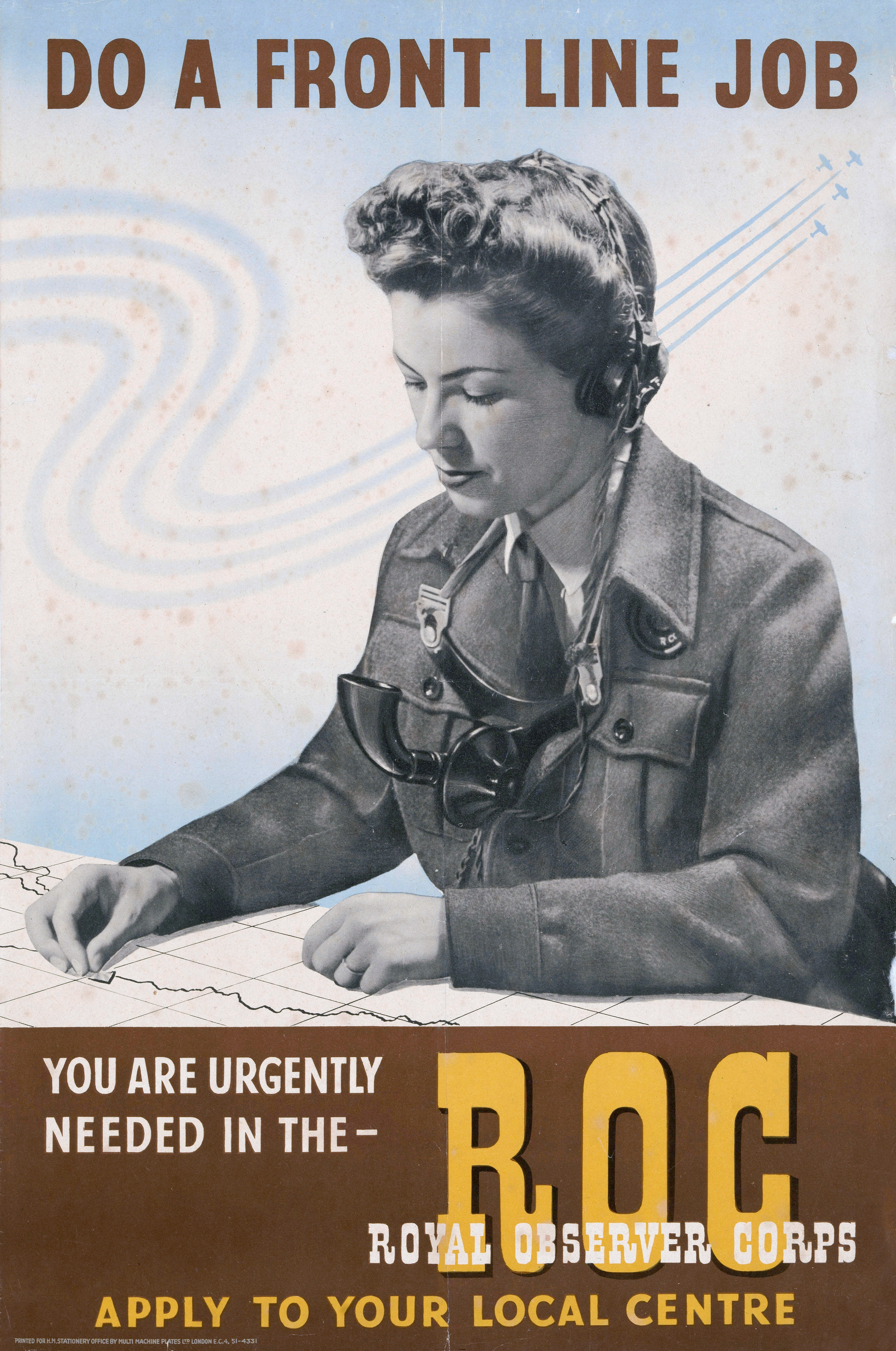
Recruitment poster

Specific duties in the centre operations room included those undertaken by:

- Plotters – responsible for updating both the plotting table and the long range board.
- Tellers – responsible for communicating with neighbouring ROC groups, Fighter Command Group and Sector controls, anti-aircraft batteries and searchlight units.
- Alarm Controllers – responsible for liaising with the Police, the National Alert System, the Ministry of Home Security and with local industrial facilities.
- Interrogator – responsible for liaising with Ground-controlled interception (GCI) radar unit operational control centres.
- Duty Controller – together with an Assistant Duty Controller and Post Controller, responsible for supervising both the centre plotters and group observation posts.

=== A royal visit ===
Perhaps the most unusual ROC post location was No.17 Group (Watford) Easy-4 Windsor Post, nestling between the battlements and chimneys on the top of Windsor Castle's Brunswick Tower. Reporting for duty through the castle gates, many newly appointed ROC Group officers were caught unawares when the castle guardsmen in their sentry boxes snapped smartly to attention and presented arms. Observers frequently encountered King George VI, Queen Elizabeth and Princess Elizabeth and Princess Margaret in the castle grounds, where they would often make a point of stopping to enquire as to ROC activities.

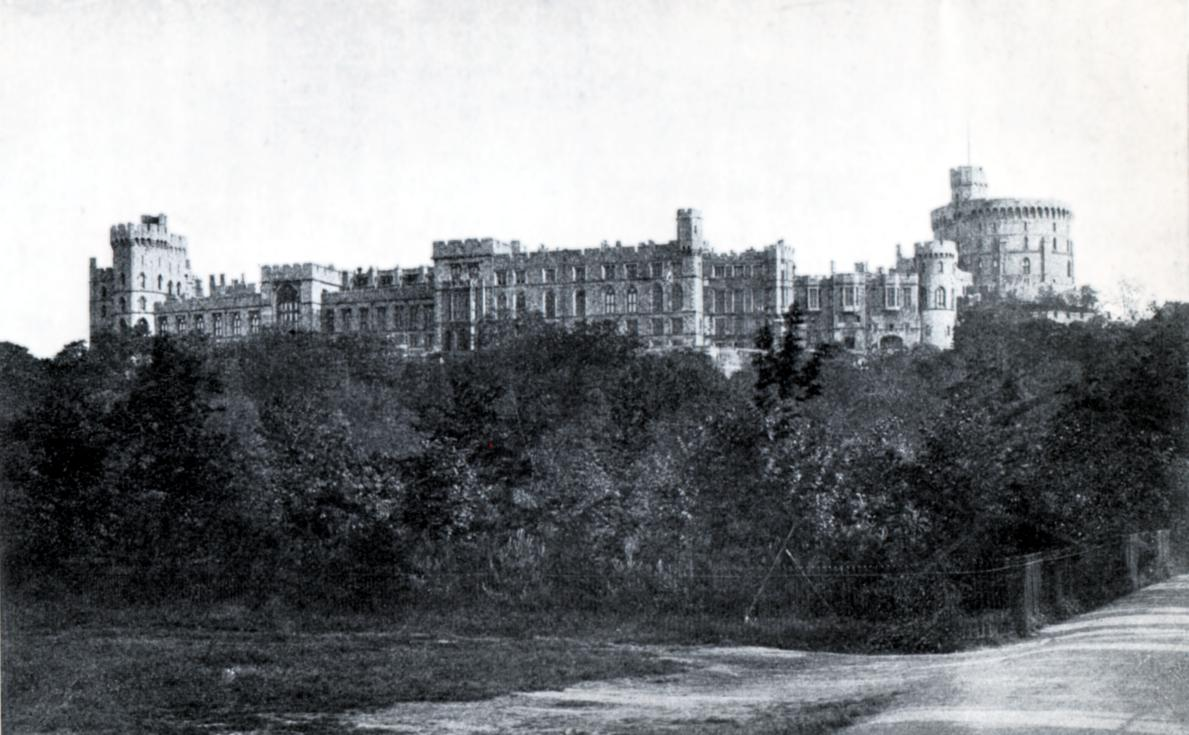
The North aspect of Windsor Castle; Brunswick being the tallest tower at the extreme left

On one occasion the observers on duty received a one-minute advance warning from a royal footman that they were about to receive a royal visit. A few minutes later, the king and queen, together with the teenage Princess Elizabeth, climbed up the steep ladder and joined the observers on the darkened roof-top while a major V-1 flying bomb attack was taking place over London. The royal visitors stayed for over an hour, asking technical questions and looking through binoculars at the unfolding aerial battle. Prior to departing, the royal party autographed the post duty log. The following evening, the royal party again appeared and on this occasion stayed for a longer period, although there was little aerial activity due to poor weather.

In the early 1960s, when the nuclear reporting role building programme was in full swing, the ROC post at Windsor relocated to the cellar beneath the Brunswick Tower and a partial monitoring room was excavated under the garden in front of the tower's base. The BPI (Bomb Power Indicator) and FSM (Fixed Survey Meter) instrument fittings on the lawn were visible to the many tourists visiting the castle, although few would have realised their significance. The GZI (Ground Zero Indicator) was mounted on top of the tower's battlements involving a climb of several hundred circular stone steps and 400 feet (120 m) in each direction. The observers at the Windsor post were unique in the country in not having to provide their own food during exercises. Instead, they received hot meals, brought by royal footman, from the castle kitchens. Twelve months after the ROC post was closed, the Brunswick Tower was the starting point and seat of the 1992 Windsor Castle fire and was substantially damaged.

=== Ghosts in ROC uniforms ===
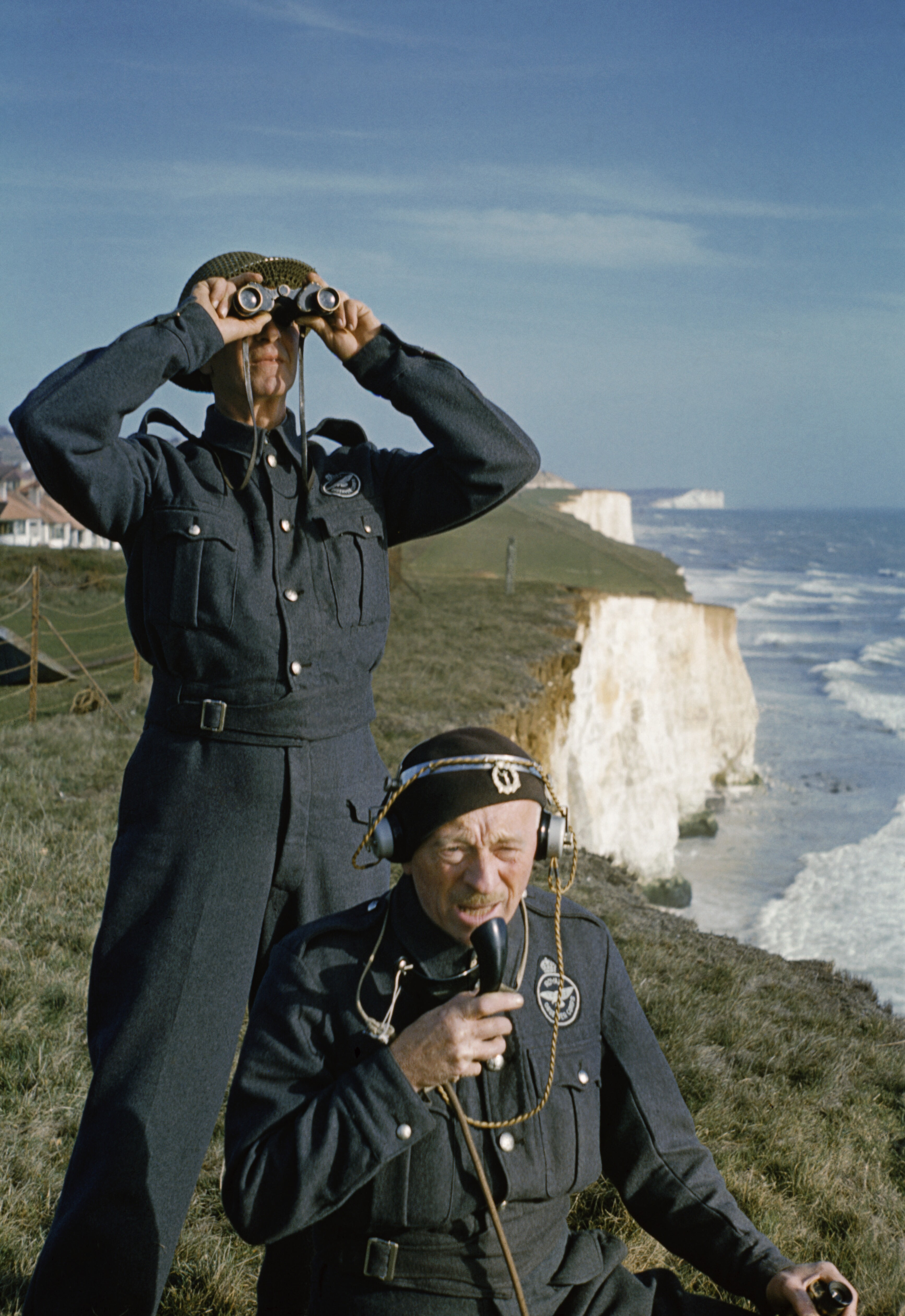
Observation was not the only duty undertaken by those in ROC uniform.

The ROC provided an additional function to the war-time UK Government by providing a plausible cover story for a number of covert war-time operations. Up to twenty highly secret electronic warfare units and Y-stations were established across the UK, with their MI8 associated scientists, technicians and engineers being dressed in Royal Observer Corps uniforms so as to avoid arousing suspicion while entering and leaving Royal Air Force, Army, Royal Navy and other MoD establishments.

Throughout the Second World War, ROC personnel were paid expenses and allowances in cash via their Group HQ and several Deputy Group Commandants discovered that they had up to one hundred additional observers appearing on their staff roll, with each additional observer being seen to receiving higher than normal allowances, despite these individuals having never reported for duty as members of the Royal Observer Corps.

A notable example of one such cover story involving the ROC is that which took place at RAF Little Rissington, where a series of tunnels were excavated during the 1940s. RAF Little Rissington forces personnel and local residents were informed that this activity was associated with an ROC unit, which was indeed seen to be manned by individuals wearing ROC uniforms. The ROC however had no knowledge of the existence of this supposed ROC facility until many years after the war had drawn to a close.

The true nature of the activities of these Ghost ROC personnel remains classified information, with public access to related documents being denied until 2045.

=== Briefly stood down ===
On 12 May 1945, when it was confirmed that the Luftwaffe had ceased combat operations, the ROC stood down. In recognition of the contribution made by ROC personnel in the Allied victory, the Air Ministry held a massed RAF rally and air display at RAF North Weald, in Essex, from Saturday 23 to Monday 25 June 1945. Over 2,000 ROC personnel were invited to attend, with at least two observers from each ROC facility representing their respective post or centre. As part of the event, the new ensign of the ROC (a Royal Air Force Ensign, defaced with the ROC badge in the fly in place of the RAF roundel – a design approved by King George VI), was dedicated at a special service.

On the day of the dedication of the ensign, (Sunday 24th), the approximately 2,000 observers present undertook the first ever uniformed ROC march-past to the accompaniment of the RAF Band, with the Under-Secretary of State for Air, Lord Beatty, taking the salute. The parade then formed into a huge square and the ROC Ensign was presented by Lord Beatty. The Ensign was borne from the drumhead by Observer Lieutenant Pollock, VC. During the parade, Observer Lieutenant Pollock carried the Ensign, flanked by two senior NCOs, at the head of the massed contingent of observers. A film record of these events is held in the archives at the Imperial War Museum. However, in a matter of only a few months, the ROC would again be called upon to meet the challenges posed by a new threat: the Cold War.

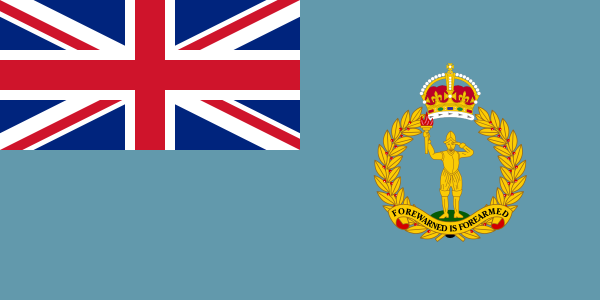
1945 ROC Ensign. (Tudor Crown shown. Post-1952 showed St Edward's Crown).

ROC Certificate of War Service.

ROC Record of Service.

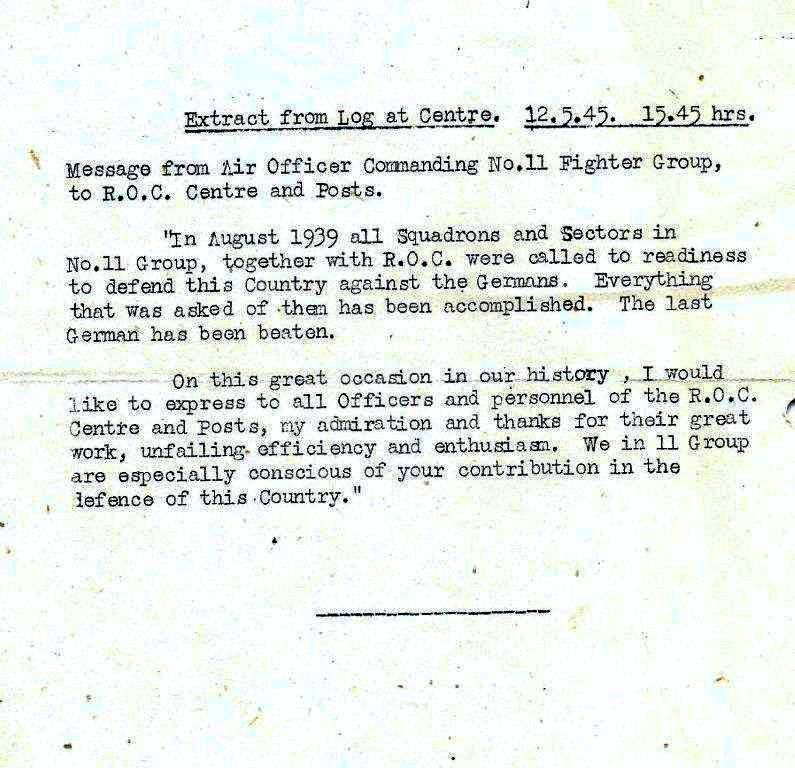
Message from AOC, No. 11 Group RAF.

Card from No. 19 (Bromley) Group "Dinner and Presentation", 1945.

== Cold War ==
=== New role ===
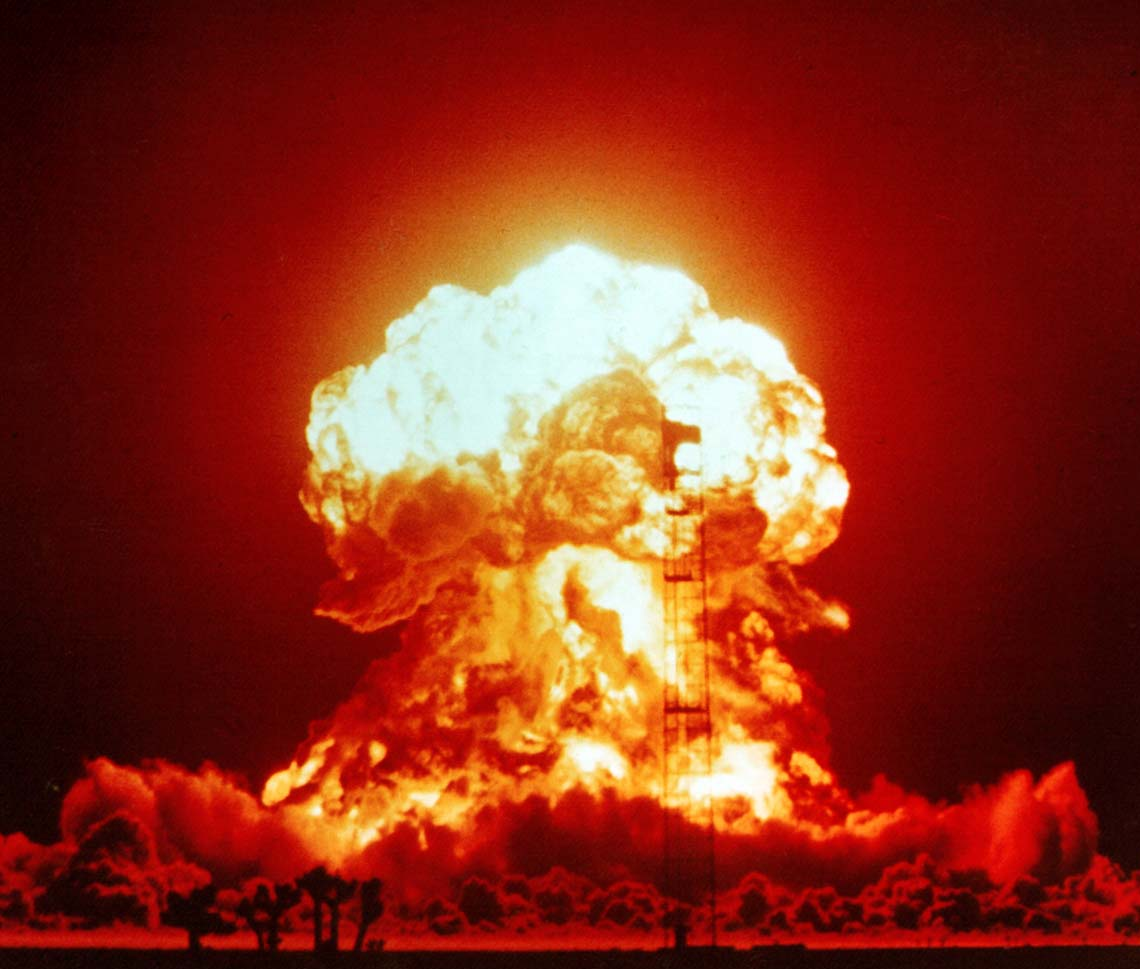
"BADGER". (18 April, 1953). Part of the Operation Upshot–Knothole series of nuclear tests at the Nevada Test Site.

In September 1947, over a year after VE Day, the ROC held the first of a series of small scale exercises in southern England, which included for the first time substantial numbers of jet aircraft, principally the Gloster Meteor. The following year the first large scale exercise took place over a four-day period; in the latter half of which radar was used as the sole means of monitoring and controlling participating aircraft. By the mid-1950s, the greater speeds and altitudes attained by jet aircraft combined with the improved performance of radar led to a reduced requirement on the part of the RAF for the services of the ROC in tracking aircraft. However, to compensate for a reduced role with regard to aircraft, an additional role for the ROC, in the form of defending against the effects of nuclear weapons, was announced in June 1955. The first significant exercise undertaken by the ROC involving a simulated nuclear attack took place during 1956, and by the following year the British Government had concluded that the combination of a risk of nuclear attack and a need for a nuclear deterrent would be the overriding considerations which would shape UK defence policy. With that view firmly in place, any pretence that an aircraft recognition and reporting role for the ROC would continue all but disappeared.

In 1957, the United Kingdom Warning and Monitoring Organisation (UKWMO) was established under Home Office control. It was intended that the UKWMO would provide both civil and military authorities in the UK with essential information during a nuclear attack, with the ROC providing primary data on the position and magnitude of atomic weapons detonated during any such attack. This data would be used by the UKWMO, in conjunction with weather information provided by the Meteorological Office, to produce a forecast of radioactive fallout. Fallout would be monitored as and where it occurred, with its actual location and strength mapped using data obtained from instrumentation at ROC posts. Such information when combined with ROCMet, (data concerning actual wind speed and direction obtained from cluster Master Posts equipped with wind anemometers and other basic meteorological instruments), would permit the dissemination of accurate forecasts predicting the distribution and strength of nuclear fallout.

=== Restructuring and reconstruction ===
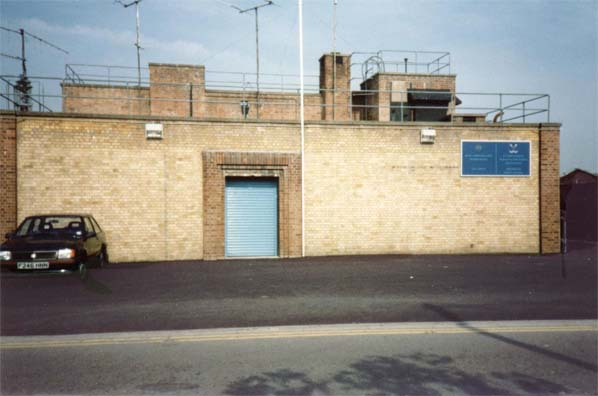
No.16 (Shrewsbury) Group Control: An example of Surface-Type nuclear protected accommodation; entrance and roof mounted ventilator housings being protected by blast doors. Roof mounted aerials provided communications with Master Posts and adjacent groups.

In 1962, the forty ROC Groups were reorganised and reduced in number to thirty-one, with a further reduction to twenty-five taking place in 1968. Service age limits of 16 to 65 were introduced, with service after the age of 65 only occurring where replacements could not be recruited, subject to annual review, and where appropriate medical certificates could be provided. (Some individuals acting as wartime post observers had served well into their seventies and eighties, although wartime centre observers had been forced to retire at fifty.)

ROC centres were renamed as Controls and provided with bomb proof nuclear protected buildings. A small number of these were converted from suitable pre-existing Second World War anti-aircraft operations rooms (AAORs), with the remainder specially constructed as above ground or semi-sunk blockhouse buildings. These were constructed to a standard layout, dependent upon the subsoil composition at the construction site. Controls provided living and operational accommodation for up to a hundred observers and UKWMO warning teams. Included in the centre layout were male and female dormitories, kitchen and canteen provision, life support systems and decontamination facilities, a communications centre and a split level central operations room with balcony positions.

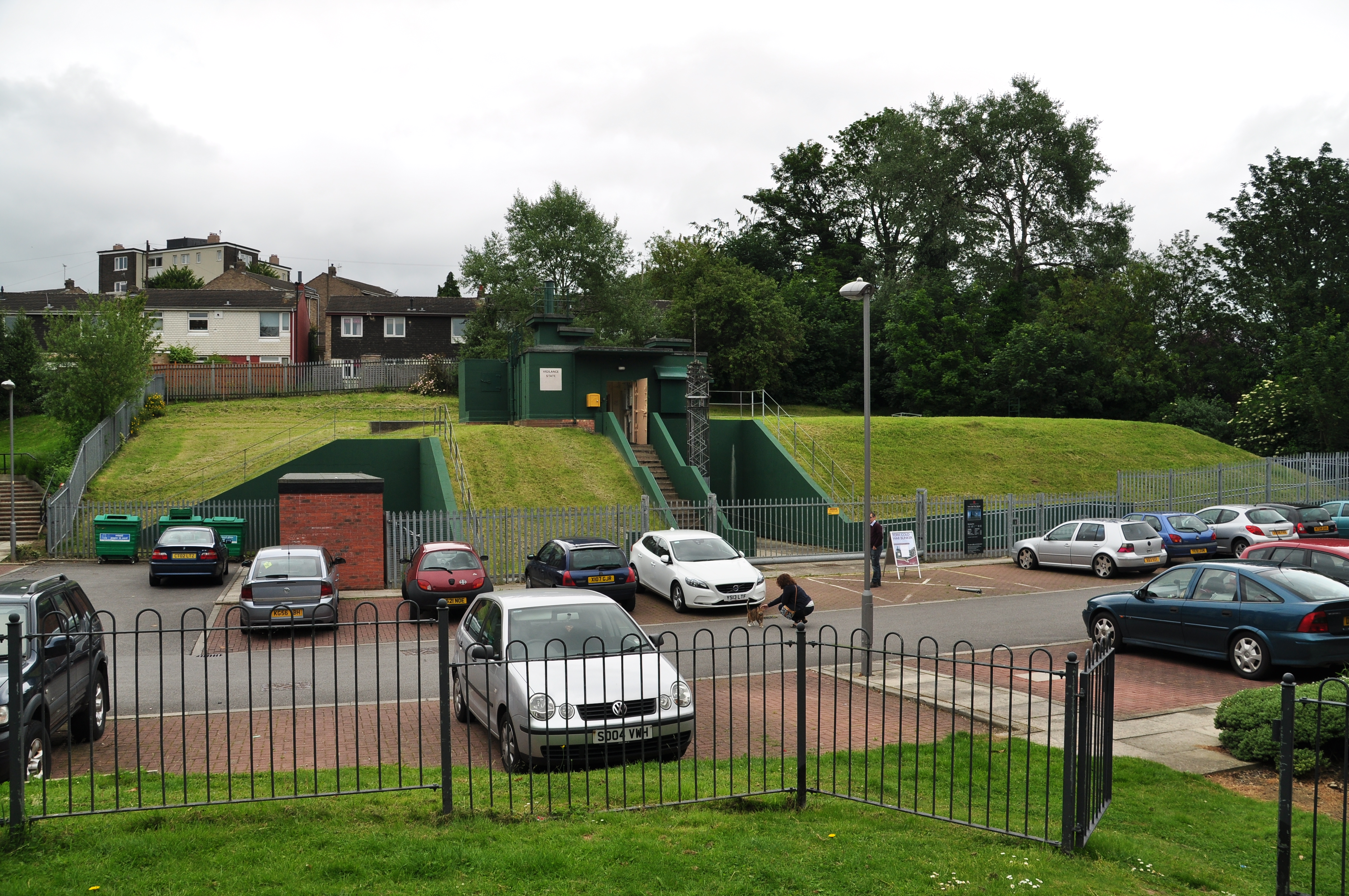
No.20 (York) Group Control: A restored example of a semi-sunken bunker owned by English Heritage and open to the public.

In the vicinity of each control was a compact, brick built shack called the Radiac Store, which housed approximately 20 nuclear radiation sources in the form of milled metal discs. These discs, with strengths of 0.5 röntgen, 1 röntgen, 5 röntgens and 10 röntgens, were securely stored in lead-lined containers. Discs had to be audited monthly which entailed an ROC officer physically counting the discs into the palm of their bare hands, with the results being recorded in a log book. (This task was usually achieved with a degree of haste). Discs were used to calibrate and check the stocks of radiac instruments and for simulated live-training using such instruments. In practice, Health and Safety at Work regulations introduced in the 1970s resulted in radioactive sources being rarely if ever used, and as a result they seldom left the radiac store. Discs were finally withdrawn from service and returned to Aldermaston during the mid-1980s, with the last exercise involving such live radiation sources taking place at RAF West Raynham in 1980, during the annual ROC summer training camp.

To enable the ROC to operate in a nuclear environment, changes were necessary to both centres and posts in order to provide protection against blast effects and radiation from nuclear bursts. It would also now be necessary for control centres and observation posts to be occupied for a period of between seven and twenty-one days following any nuclear event. Between 1958 and 1968 a countrywide building programme resulted in a network of 1,563 underground monitoring posts, approximately eight miles (13 km) apart, distributed throughout England, Scotland, Wales and Northern Ireland, at an estimated cost of almost £5,000 each. The posts were excavated to a depth of twenty-five feet (7.6 m), a monocoque reinforced concrete building was cast and bitumen tanked (or waterproofed), before the whole structure was covered by a compacted soil mound. Entry was facilitated by a steel ladder in a vertical shaft leading to a single room, providing accommodation for three observers to live and work, with a separate toilet compartment with chemical closet. Air was circulated from grilled ventilators at both ends of the post and electricity was provided by a crated 12 volt lead–acid battery, charged occasionally by a portable petrol electric generator. New instrumentation detected the peak overpressure from any nuclear burst, together with photographic indications of the burst location and size, plus resulting levels of radiation. Conditions in these spartan posts were cramped, cold, and in some cases damp.

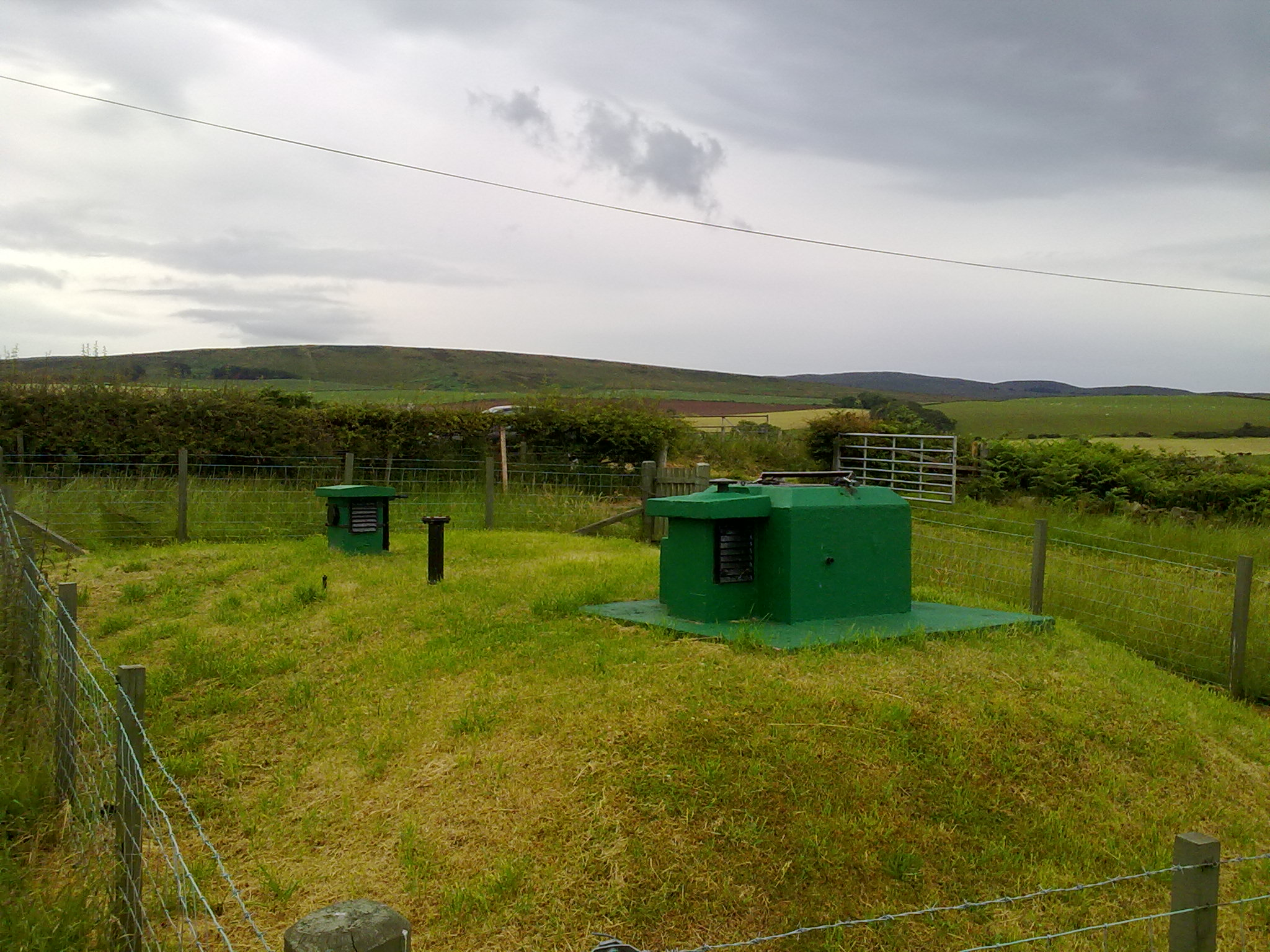
ROC Underground Monitoring Post; 23 Post Skelmorlie, No. 25 (Ayr) Group. There are 1,563 such posts throughout Great Britain and Northern Ireland.

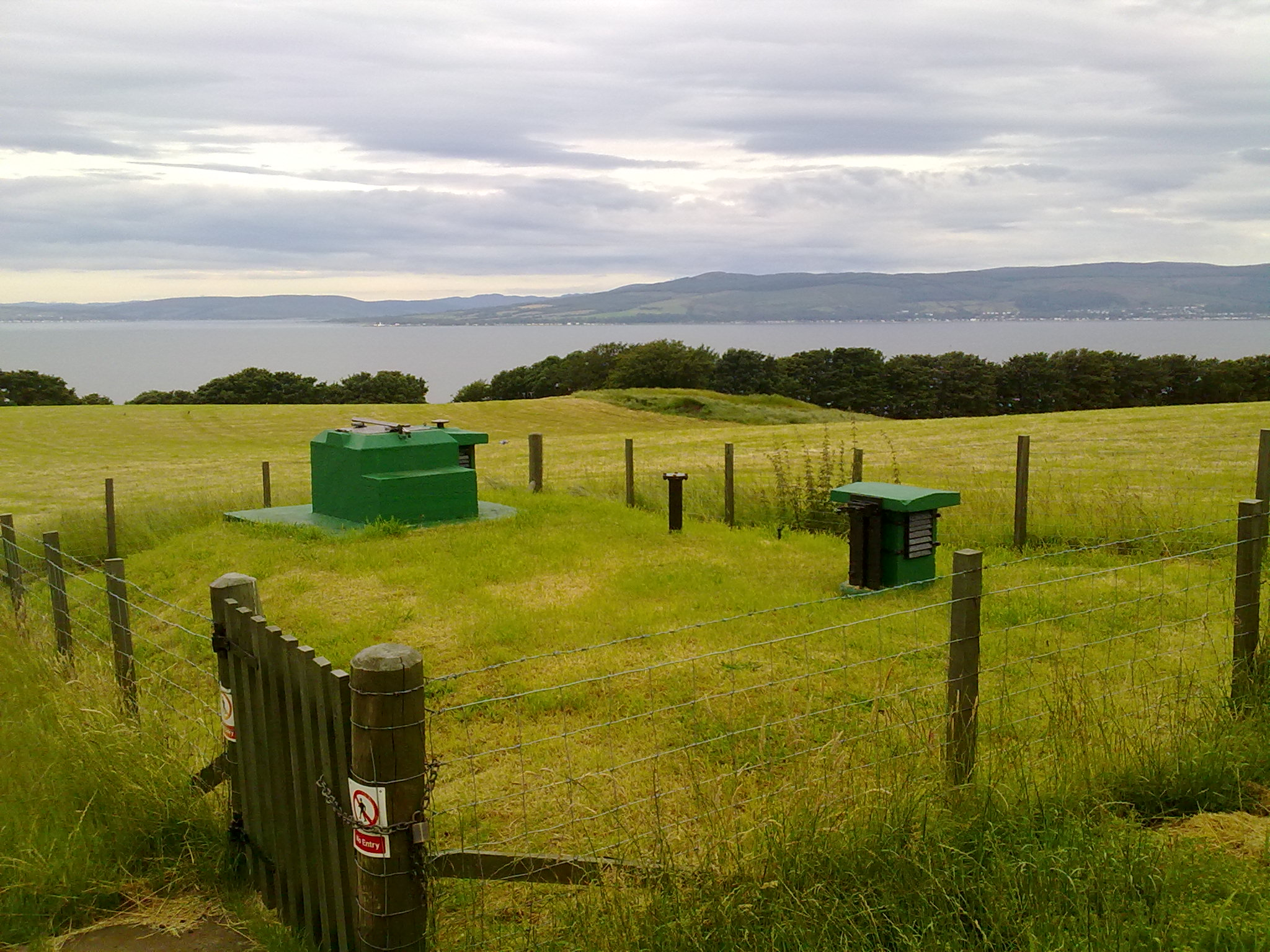
Surface structures consist of a hatch covered entrance shaft (left), ventilation shaft (right) and instrument fixing pipes and plates (centre).

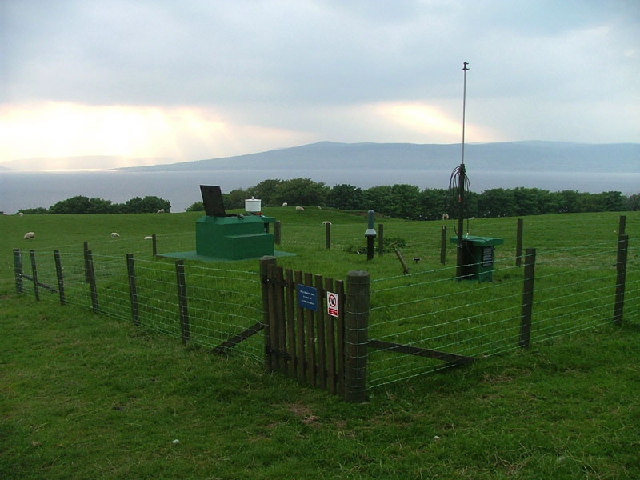
Visible during exercises; open hatch (subject to weather), GZI drum (white), FSM cover (green), BPI baffle plates (black) and, at Master Posts, aerial mast.

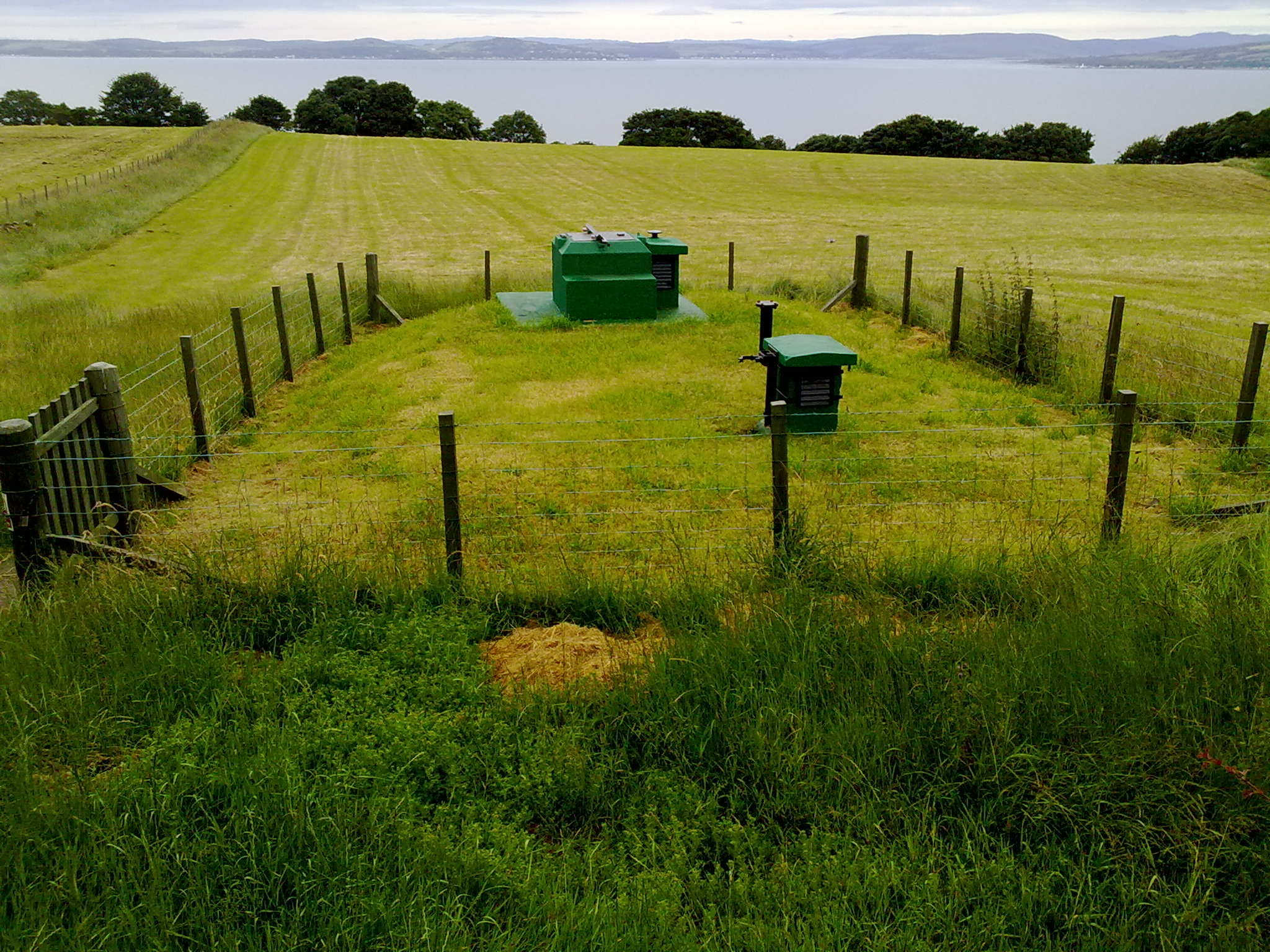
Unlike so many others of its type, 23 Post Skelmorlie is now a privately maintained museum, open to members of the public by appointment.

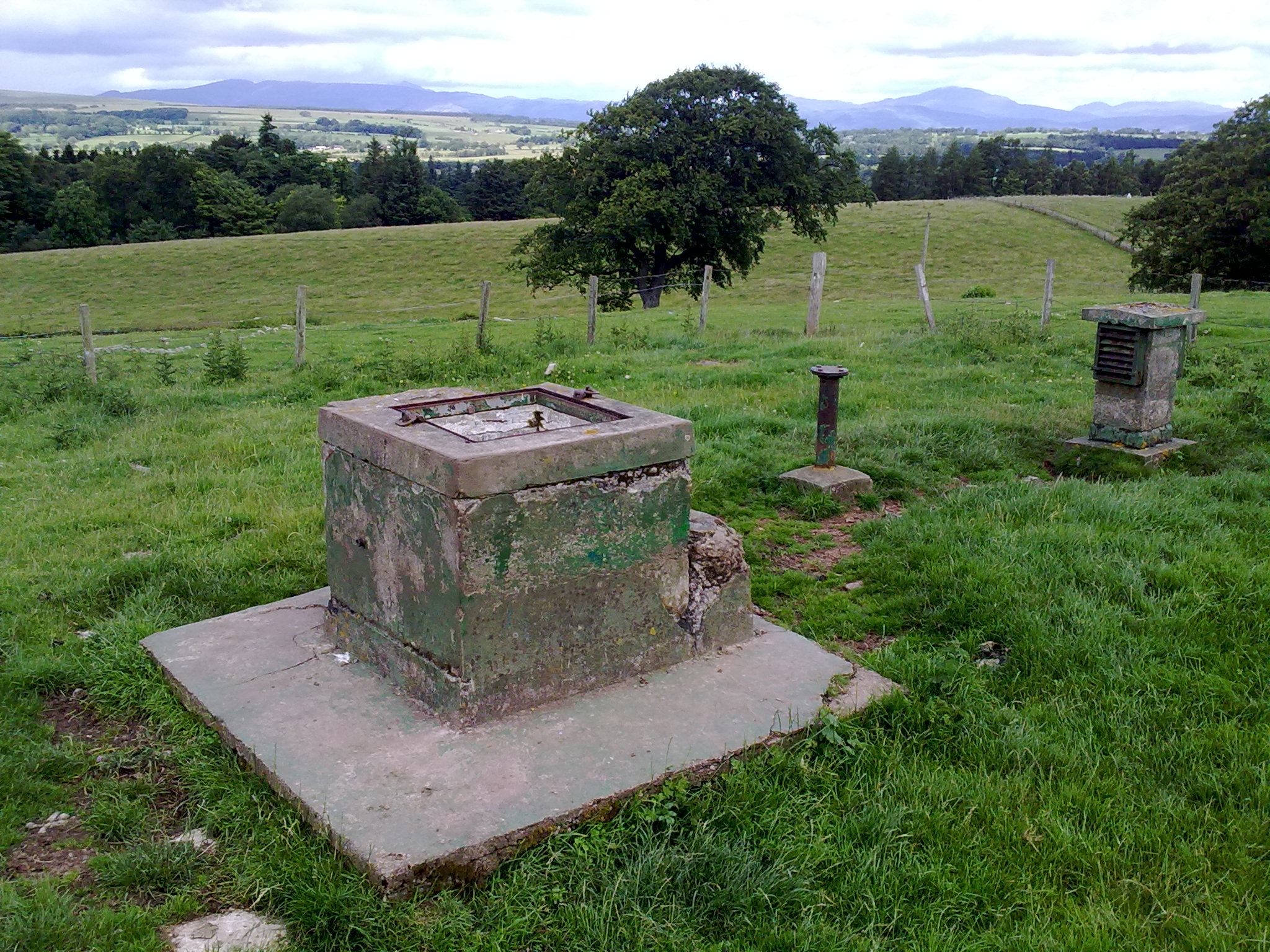
The vast majority of posts have been abandoned to the elements, with typically weather-beaten examples found throughout the United Kingdom.

=== Nuclear reporting cells ===
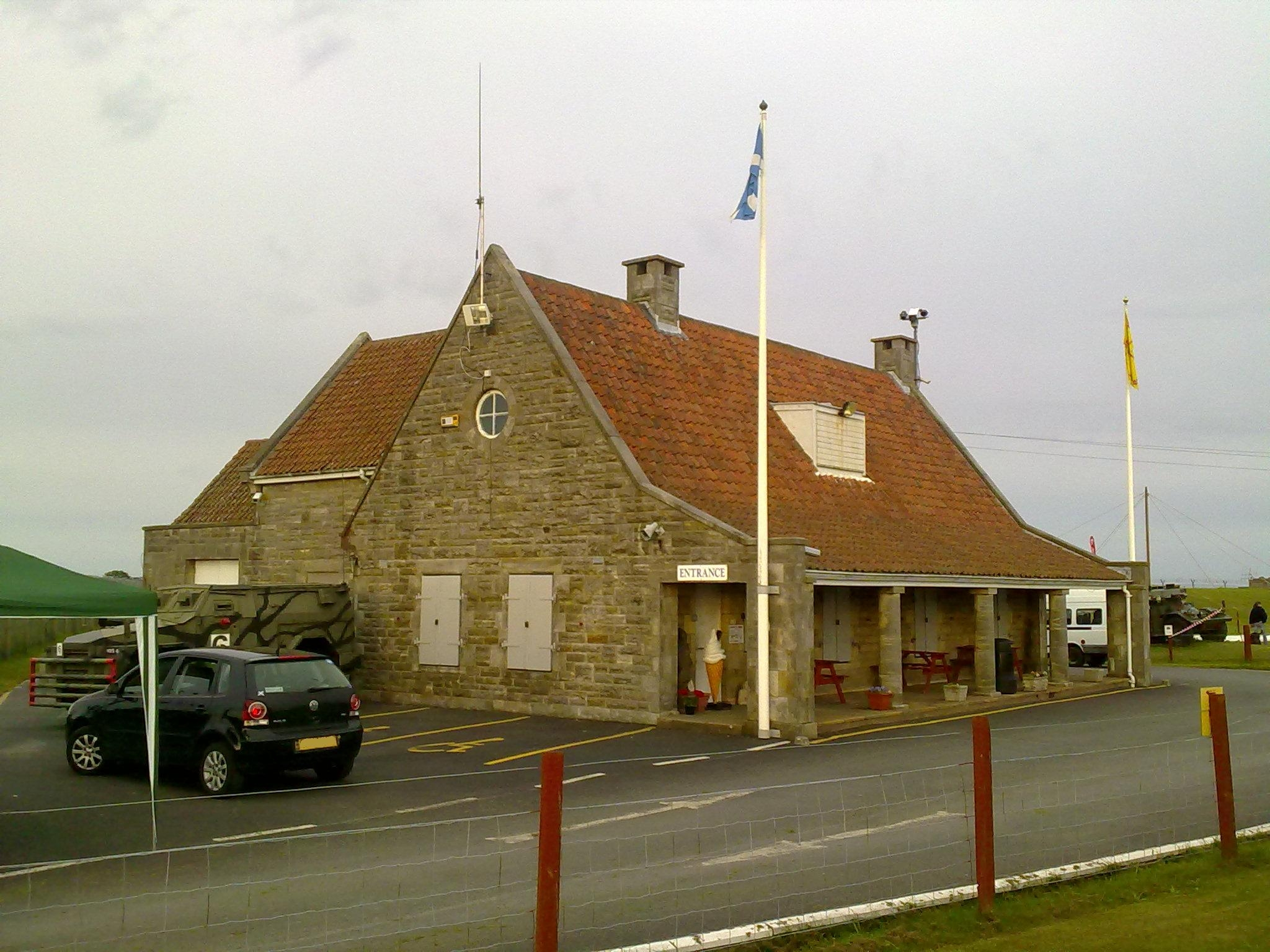
Surface building accessing "Scotland's Secret Bunker", Anstruther. A Sub-Regional Seat of Government bunker and home to a nuclear reporting cell.

During 1958, RAF Fighter Command expressed a desire to obtain data similar to that provided by the ROC in the event of a nuclear attack, specifically that concerning the location of nuclear bursts and the resulting nuclear fallout. The Air Defence Commander at the Air Defence Operations Centre, (ADOC), RAF Bentley Priory, in order to ensure continued operations by RAF mobile and static units, wished to use such data in determining which UK airfields (both civil and military) had been subject to blast damage and/or exposed to any subsequent nuclear fallout.

Due to issues surrounding RAF personnel shortages and training restrictions, HQ Fighter Command formally requested that HQROC assist in providing suitably qualified ROC personnel to staff the Fallout Reporting Sections at both the ADOC and at Fighter Command's Sector Operations Centres, (SOCs). Apart from wartime ROC/RAF Liaison Officers, this was to be the first occasion whereby ROC personnel would undertake their duties within a wholly military operational environment. In case of the ADOC at RAF Bentley Priory, sixteen ROC personnel were required to staff the Fallout Reporting Section, with the operation itself consisting of marking the position of nuclear bursts, and plotting both the reported and predicted path of fallout onto a large, vertical, transparent (perspex) map display. (Two observers working at the rear of the display would plot and update data by writing in 'reverse', thereby enabling an unobstructed view of the front of display). Actual reports of fallout were drawn onto initial templates which, when combined with meteorological forecasts, were used to extrapolate the predicted path and intensity of the fallout. This system enabled initial and subsequent predictions of fallout to be drawn, together with identifying those areas actually being affected.

During October 1958, "Exercise Nightbird", a joint air defence and nuclear fallout exercise, saw ROC personnel undertaking operational duties at the ADOC for the first time. Subsequently, operational RAF Command and Group HQs in the UK received nuclear fallout information over two broadcast circuits from the ADOC, with Fallout Reporting Section map displays at each site being updated by local ROC Special Duties teams.

This system of Fallout Reporting Sections was enhanced further when nuclear burst and fallout data was distributed by ROC Group HQs directly to what became formally designated as ROC Nuclear Reporting Cells (NRC). Nuclear Reporting Cells would go on to be located within several major armed forces HQ throughout the UK, with ROC personnel being responsible for providing the Army, Royal Navy and RAF with comprehensive visual displays and interpretation of data provided by ROC controls.

As a result of such developments taking place throughout the 1970s, a third category of Observer was introduced in addition to Post Observer and Control Observer; that of NRC Observer. The role of NRC Observer combined basic ROC training with specialist scientific skills and training normally reserved for UKWMO warning teams. Similarly, a higher level of security clearance was required by those ROC personnel acting as NRC Observers.

Several Cold War-era government facilities which were also home to NRCs are maintained as museums and are open to the public, including those at Kelvedon Hatch, Hack Green, Dover Castle and Anstruther.

=== Instrumentation ===
Underground monitoring post personnel during a training exercise. The BPI dial can be seen in the background with a teletalk, FSM radiac instrument and a UKWMO receiver on the desk.

==== For the detection of nuclear bursts ====
- Atomic Weapons Detection Recognition and Estimation of Yield, known as AWDREY, was a desk mounted automatic instrument, located at certain selected controls, which detected nuclear explosions and indicated the estimated size of the blast in megatons.
- The Bomb Power Indicator or BPI consisted of a peak overpressure gauge with a dial which would register the pressure wave from a nuclear explosion passing over the instrument.
- The Ground Zero Indicator, or GZI or shadowgraph, consisted of four horizontally mounted cardinal compass point pinhole cameras within a metal drum. Each 'camera' contained a sheet of photosensitive paper on which were printed horizontal and vertical calibration lines and, in effect, photographed the fireball of a nuclear explosion.

==== For the measurement of Ionizing radiation ====
- The Radiac Survey Meter No 2 or RSM, introduced in 1955, counted particles produced by radioactive decay.
- The Fixed Survey Meter or FSM, introduced in 1958, could be operated from within the post with a cable leading to the externally mounted detector which was protected by a polycarbonate dome. The FSM used the same obsolete high voltage (30 V) batteries as the RSM. In 1985 this instrument was replaced by the PDRM 82(F).
- The PDRM82 or Portable Dose Rate Meter and the desktop fixed PDRM 82(F) version of the same meter, manufactured by Plessey, were introduced in 1985.

==== Measurement of personal absorption ====
- The Dosimeter pocket meters were issued to individual observers for measuring their personal levels of radiation absorption.

=== Communications and technological developments ===
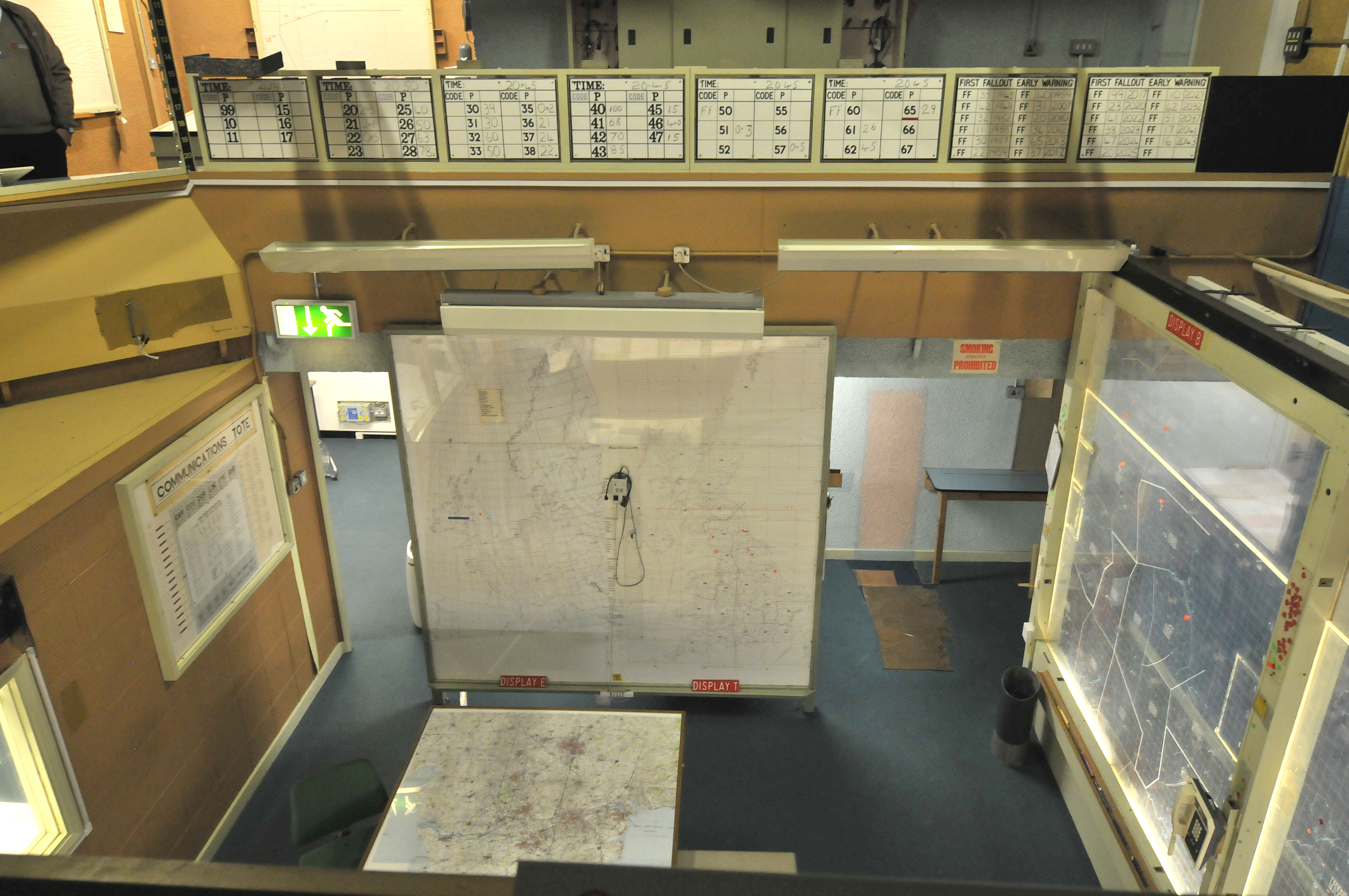
Interior of the No. 20 (York) Group Control bunker

Initially, communications between posts and controls were made using former Army-issue head-and-breast communication sets via above-ground telephone lines, these being manually switched by telephone engineers prior to use. Army head-and-breast sets were replaced in 1964 by metal housed "Teletalk" units which only permitted one-way communications when the push-to-talk switch was depressed. The Teletalk units also used manually switched telephone lines, but with integral transistorisation to boost transmission and reception power. In 1981 a new design of Teletalk (AD8010) was introduced by British Telecom together with underground, permanently wired, landline connections that were hardened against the effects of electromagnetic pulse (EMP) from nuclear bursts.

Posts were organised in "clusters" of two, three, four or five posts, with a single post in each cluster designated as the "Master Post". To guard against the possibility of a cluster being disconnected from the parent control, master posts were provided with radio equipment capable of communicating with the parent control and up to three adjacent controls using separate radio frequencies.

Inter-group control-to-control exchange of burst and radiation data was initially via "teller" voice message using telephone lines between adjacent groups. In 1971 this method was replaced by punched tape data exchanges by telegraph teleprinters located in the communications centre. Between 1981 and 1985 the teleprinters were replaced with modern computerised AD9000 message switch equipment, operating over a permanent and EMP hardened landline network, permitting direct communications between groups nationally. In the late 1980s the manually operated PMBX switchboards were replaced with computerised direct dial SX2000 equipment.

During the years immediately prior to the stand-down of the ROC, trials were undertaken with the intention of providing monitoring posts with remotely operated above ground petrol generators to provide a constant electricity supply (a portable generator capable of producing both 12 V and 240 V (Yamaha EF1000) was supplied in small quantities to a number of groups), "black" heaters to provide a warmer environment and new sealed, recycling ventilators to allow air changes without requiring the post to be exposed to a contaminated air source.

== Rank structure ==
Royal Observer Corps officer ranks insignia
NATO rank code	OF-6	OF-5	OF-4	OF-3	OF-2	OF-1
United Kingdom Epaulette rank insignia
Rank Title:	Air Commodore	Observer Captain	Observer Commander	Observer Lieutenant Commander	Observer Lieutenant	Observer Officer
Abbreviation:	Air Cdre (Note: All Commandants ROC were full time RAF personnel.)	Obs Capt	Obs Cdr	Obs Lt Cdr	Obs Lt	Obs Off
Full-time Appointments:	Commandant ROC (CROC)	Chief of Staff (CoS)	Senior Admin Officer HQROC; Senior Ops Officer HQROC; Deputy Area Commandant (5); Senior ROC Officer (SROCO) – 1992 to 1996	Ops Comms HQROC; Ops Training HQROC; Pers Serv Officer HQROC; Supply Officer HQROC; Area Staff Officer (5); Deputy Group Commandant (25)	Ops Trg 2 HQROC; Admin Officer HQROC; Group Staff Officer (25)
Spare-time Appointments:		Area Commandant (5)	Group Commandant (25)		Crew Officers; NRC Officers; Group Officers	Crew Officers; NRC Officers; Group Officers

Royal Observer Corps other ranks insignia
NATO rank code	OR-6	OR-5	OR-4	OR-3	OR-3	OR-2	OR-1
United Kingdom Rank insignia							No insignia
Rank Title:	Chief Observer		Leading Observer	Not applicable			Observer
Abbreviation:	C/Obs or C/Obs (W)		L/Obs or L/Obs (W)				Obs or Obs (W)
Spare-time Appointments:	Crew Supervisor (225), NRC Supervisor (30) or Post Head Observer (872)		Crew Supervisor (375), NRC Supervisor (60) or Post Instructor (872)				Crew, NRC or Post observer (c 8,000)

== Uniform and other insignia ==
Royal Banner of the ROC. (The Astral Crown forms the finial).

The ROC crest and cap badge depict a 16th-century Beacon Lighter holding aloft a flaming torch while shielding his eyes with his free hand, as though looking towards a distant place or object. This central figure is encircled by a wreath of gilt laurel and surmounted by the Royal Crown, the motto being Forewarned is Forearmed. Uniform tunic buttons, lapel badges and the reverse of the ROC Medal also depict this figure in the same pose while standing beside a warning beacon, with a chain of lit beacons extending along the coastline into the distance. (In this representation it was easy to imagine the figure looking out towards the next beacon in the chain). The symbol of the Beacon Lighter has its origins in the Elizabethan era, where such individuals were organised and paid for by the county sheriff to tend and light beacons to warn of approaching enemies, such as the Spanish Armada of that period. (The beacon lighter figure is referred to affectionately as "Firey Fred").

Unlike an Armed Services unit (having a regimental colour), the ROC has, in place of such, a Royal Banner. Presented by Queen Elizabeth II, both in 1966 and 1991, these were laid up in 1991 (St Clement Danes) and 1995 (RAF Cranwell) respectively. Unusually, the Imperial State Crown and St Edward's Crown appear together. (The ROC Ensign, first authorised in 1945, differs from the ROC Royal Banner in that from 1952, following the accession of HM Queen Elizabeth II, the ROC badge was thenceforth ensigned with the St Edward's Crown). During October 2015, the Royal Banner at RAF Cranwell was temporarily 'Lodged-Out' to RAF Northolt, prior to being laid up at St Clement Danes Church, where it replaced the 1966 banner.

Proposed Master Observer rank badge

When the ROC was first issued with RAF style uniforms in 1941, the RAF was able to provide the majority of the uniform items but held insufficient stocks of RAF blue berets. However, at that time the Army held a surplus of Royal Tank Regiment berets, therefore the ROC was initially issued with the black beret of the RTR. Post World War II, there followed a transition to the 1947-issue GS (General Service) midnight blue/dark blue beret, which thereafter remained part of the ROC uniform. There was a similar shortage of both Sergeant and Corporal stripes. However, there existed a large surplus of rank badges destined for the quasi-military Royal Canadian (Volunteer) Storekeeper Corps who served in UK dockside warehouses during the Second World War. These badges, displaying horizontal bars within a wreath of laurel leaves, were adopted for the ROC, with Chief Storekeeper becoming Chief Observer and Leading Storekeeper becoming Leading Observer. The four bar rank of Master Storekeeper was discounted initially, but was again under consideration in 1990 as an RAF Warrant Officer equivalent rank styled Master Observer; intended to act as dedicated assistants to Crew, Group and NRC officers. However, the decision on whether to introduce the rank of Master Observer was overtaken by the standing down announcement. (The surplus rank badges destined for the Royal Canadian (Volunteer) Storekeeper Corps were also used by the United States' Civilian Technical Corps, who were based in the UK during the Second World War).

Many observers joined the ROC after service in other armed forces. Aircrew brevets from the RAF, Army Air Corps and Royal Naval Air Service/Fleet Air Arm were permitted to be worn on ROC uniforms, along with any medal ribbons from British or British Empire (later Commonwealth) countries. Other permitted badges were specialist trade badges such as parachute brevets, marksman badges, radio operator badges, etc. The 796 volunteer observers who served on board Defensively Equipped Merchant Ships and US Navy vessels during the D-Day landings were permitted to wear the Seaborne shoulder flash for the remainder of their service with the ROC, including where promoted to officer ranks. A handful of Seaborne Observers remained in active service with the ROC when the majority of the spare-time volunteer members were stood down in 1991. (Several Seaborne Observers purportedly lied about their age in 1941 in order to qualify for special service duty).

From 1977 the uncomfortable wartime-issue "hairy mary" RAF No.2 Battledress uniforms were replaced in a rolling programme with comfortable, modern zip-fronted 1972 pattern No.2 RAF uniforms, immediately christened as 'mothercare suits' due to the shapeless style of these loose fitting jackets. RAF-issue blue shirts with collars attached, black ties, practical woollen jerseys known as 'wooly pullies' and additionally, for post observers only, new style green overalls and blue nylon foul weather jackets and overtrousers were issued. Standard RAF footwear was issued to all ranks below that of officer and to all spare-time officers. (Full-time officers purchased footwear at their own expense).

The ROC stable belt, incorporating the colours of the ROC Medal ribbon, was authorised by the Commandant ROC and introduced in 1985 for male personnel wearing service working dress No. 2b. These were introduced as an optional, non-issue item to be purchased at the individual's expense. Another optional self-purchase item for male observers wearing Number 2 Dress was the RAF field service cap or forage cap, also called the side cap, "chip bag" or "cheese cutter". In 1983, women observers were granted permission to purchase the WRAF pillbox Number 2 Dress hat, also called the "hostess" or "stewardess" hat, which could be worn in place of the beret.

=== ROC proficiency badges ===
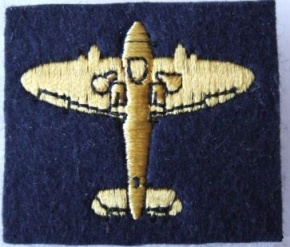
Gold Spitfire proficiency badge awarded for 25 master test passes with a score ≥ 90%.

All ROC ranks below that of Observer Officer were entitled to wear a Spitfire proficiency badge to mark success in the annual ROC Master Test examination. The first version of this test was introduced during the Second World War as a measure of competency in the field of aircraft recognition, with candidates required to correctly identify a set of aircraft silhouette cards in order to be judged proficient. (Results and names of those observers who had met the required standard were published at the rear of the ROC magazine). The insignia awarded to those who had been successful was a printed badge depicting a white Spitfire on blue/grey material. The test cards were later replaced by photographic slides projected onto a screen using a "Flash Trainer" projector. Between 1956 and 1966 the test became a mix of aircraft recognition and written answers to questions relating to the nuclear detection role. Latterly the master test was a 100-question multiple-choice test, and separate specialist papers were provided for post and NRC observers.

The five levels of test result ranged from Failure to Basic Pass to Intermediate Pass, a First Class Pass and finally Master Pass. A score of 90% or above was required for the award of a Master Pass. On the first occasion a Master Pass was achieved, a Blue Spitfire badge would be awarded. Upon the fifth master pass a Red Spitfire was awarded with a Red Star badge added for every five master passes until the twenty fifth pass, when the combined Red Spitfire and 3 Red Stars were replaced with a Gold Spitfire. (The Gold Spitfire badge was first introduced in 1988, although it could be awarded retrospectively).

The age limits of ROC service meant that in order to achieve the coveted Gold Spitfire and 3 Gold Stars a master-level pass was required during almost every year of an observer's service, assuming the observer joined at the minimum age. As a result, very few Gold Spitfire badges were awarded, and yet fewer Gold Stars.

Latterly in 1987 it was announced that a First Class pass in the master test would be recognised by the award of a stand-alone blue star, for those observers who had not previously achieved a master pass and the award of a Spitfire badge.

==== Proficiency badge progression ====
Number of master level passes	Badges (both sleeves)
1	Blue Spitfire
5	Red Spitfire
10	Red Spitfire + 1 Red Star
15	Red Spitfire + 2 Red Stars
20	Red Spitfire + 3 Red Stars
25	Gold Spitfire
30	Gold Spitfire + 1 Gold Star
35	Gold Spitfire + 2 Gold Stars
40	Gold Spitfire + 3 Gold Stars

=== Royal Observer Corps Medal ===
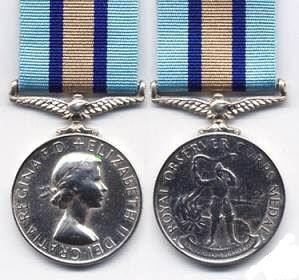
Royal Observer Corps Medal

Prior to the Second World War, observers were employed by county police forces and qualified for the Special Constabulary Long Service Medal after nine years continuous service. However, following RAF Fighter Command assuming control of the ROC in 1939, this medal ceased to be awarded to members of the ROC.

In 1950, King George VI granted permission for the issue of a Royal Observer Corps Medal for twelve years continuous service. Each subsequent period of twelve years was recognised by the award of a clasp depicting a winged crown attached to the medal ribbon. Peace time service by full-time officers was calculated at a rate of 50% for qualifying years, thereby requiring up to twenty four years service to qualify for a medal or subsequent clasp. However, any war or part-time service previously undertaken by such individuals counted in full. The medal ceased to be awarded when the ROC was stood down in December 1995.

Ribbon bar (Worn on the left)

The medal ribbon is a mix of pale blue, dark blue and silver vertical stripes, representing the pale blue of the daytime sky with a searchlight's beam in a night sky at the centre. A pattern which, together with additional outer stripes of dark blue, is repeated in the ROC stable belt. (The sequence of blue stripes on the medal ribbon are the reverse of those appearing on the ROC regimental tie, which itself conforms to the pattern of the ROC unit flash applied to green painted ”Tommy Helmets” worn during Second World War).

==== Second World War medals ====
Defence Medal ribbon bar

ROC personnel who served for 1,080 days during the war qualified for the Defence Medal. The 796 members of the ROC temporarily enrolled in the Royal Navy for services afloat during the June 1944 Normandy landings qualified for the appropriate campaign medals. Most served for one or two months and were entitled to the France and Germany Star and the War Medal. Two members of the Corps were killed, one wounded and ten mentioned in despatches, and were additionally entitled to the 1939-1945 Star. A total of 235 of these D Day veterans went on to receive the ROC Medal.

=== Uniform and other insignia gallery ===
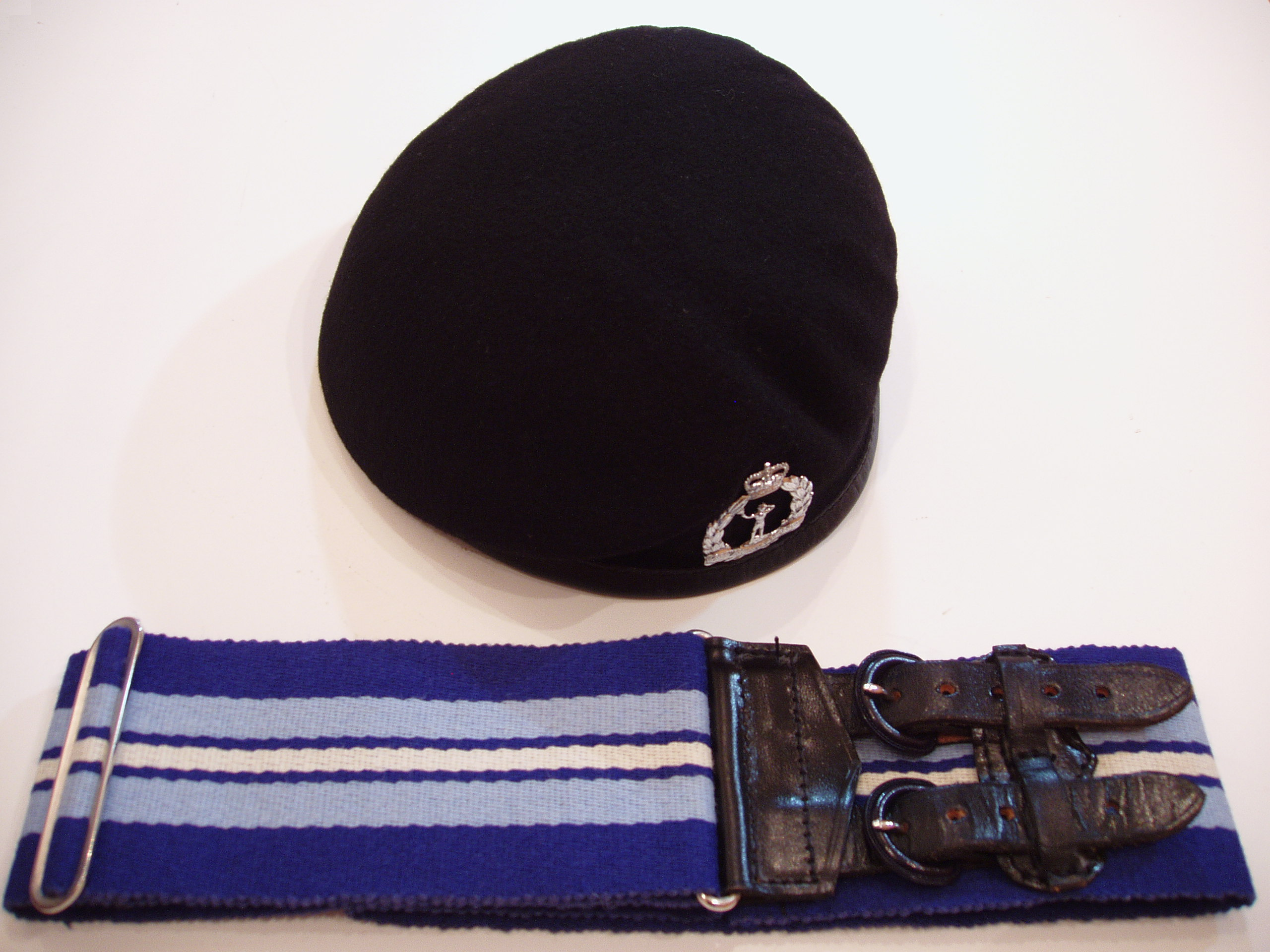
Midnight Blue beret, silvered cap badge, (officers denoted by a gilt cap badge), and stable belt. Badge depicts the Beacon Lighter within a laurel wreath, surmounted by a crown; the motto "FOREWARNED IS FOREARMED" on an overlying scroll.

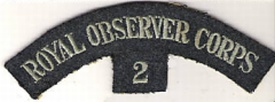
ROC shoulder title and Group numeral; indicating No. 2 (Horsham) Group.

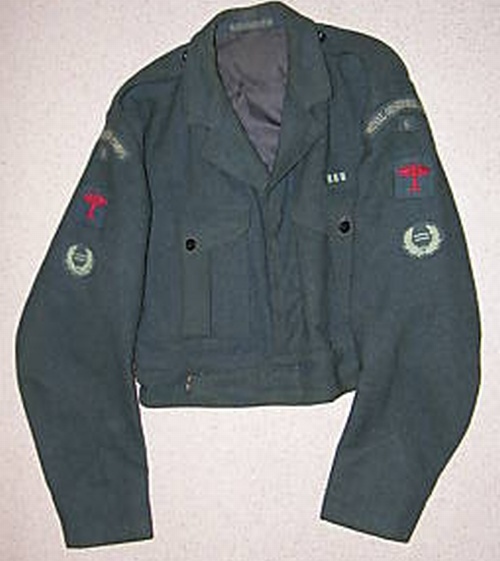
No.2 Battledress blouse, (RAF 1947 pattern), showing medal ribbon bar and plastic Beacon Lighter buttons. Sleeves: Shoulder flash, Group numeral, Red "Spitfire" proficiency and Leading Observer badges.

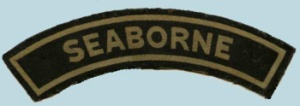
Seaborne shoulder flash, worn on both sleeves below the Group numeral.

Blue "Star" proficiency badge indicating "1st Class Pass" (80-89%) in the Master test; worn above any rank and below any Spitfire badges. Red and Gold stars were awarded to indicate five Master Test Passes (90-100%).

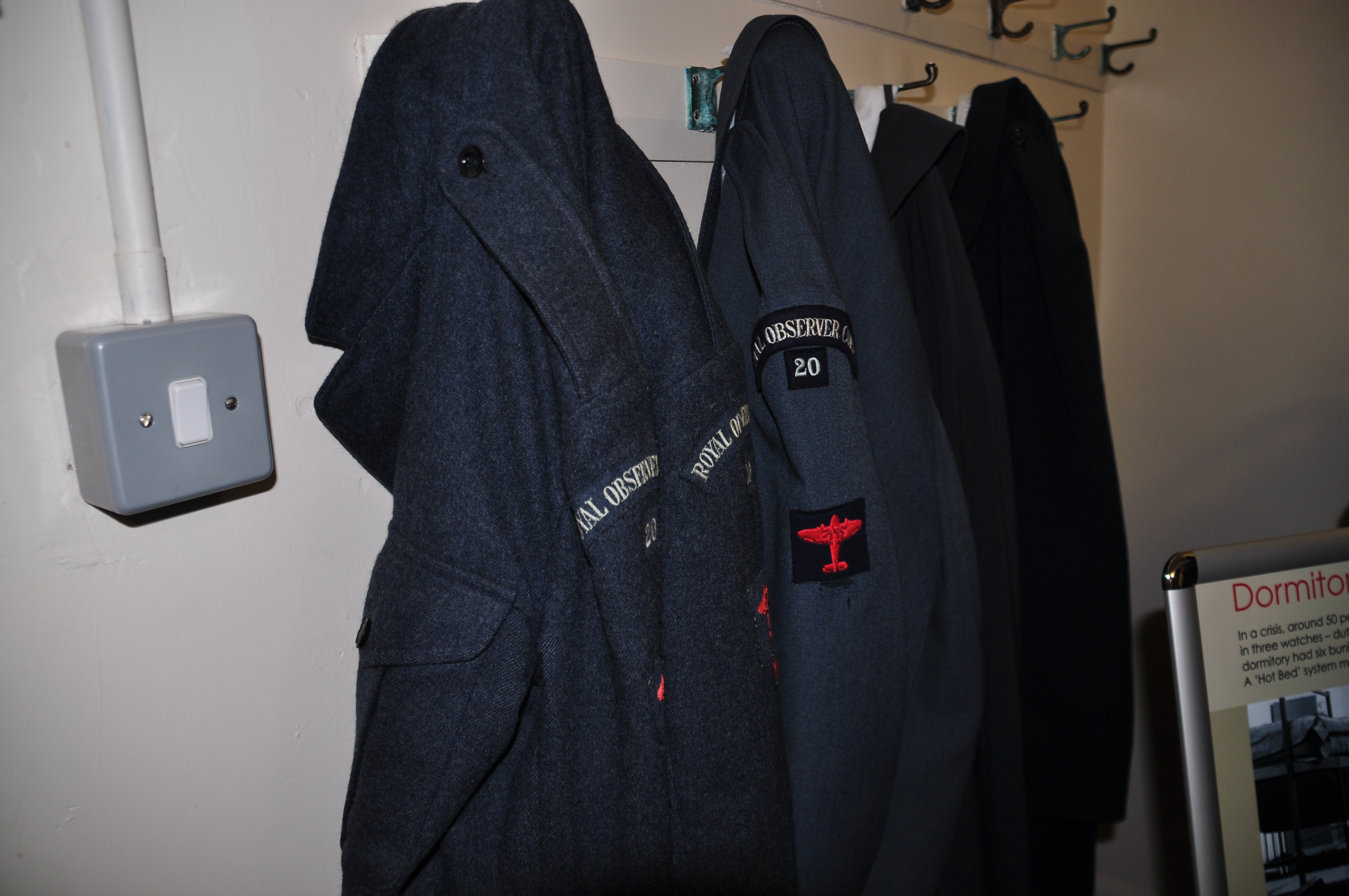
Red "Spitfire" proficiency badge, worn above any rank badge, (blue [blue/grey] and Gold versions were also awarded).

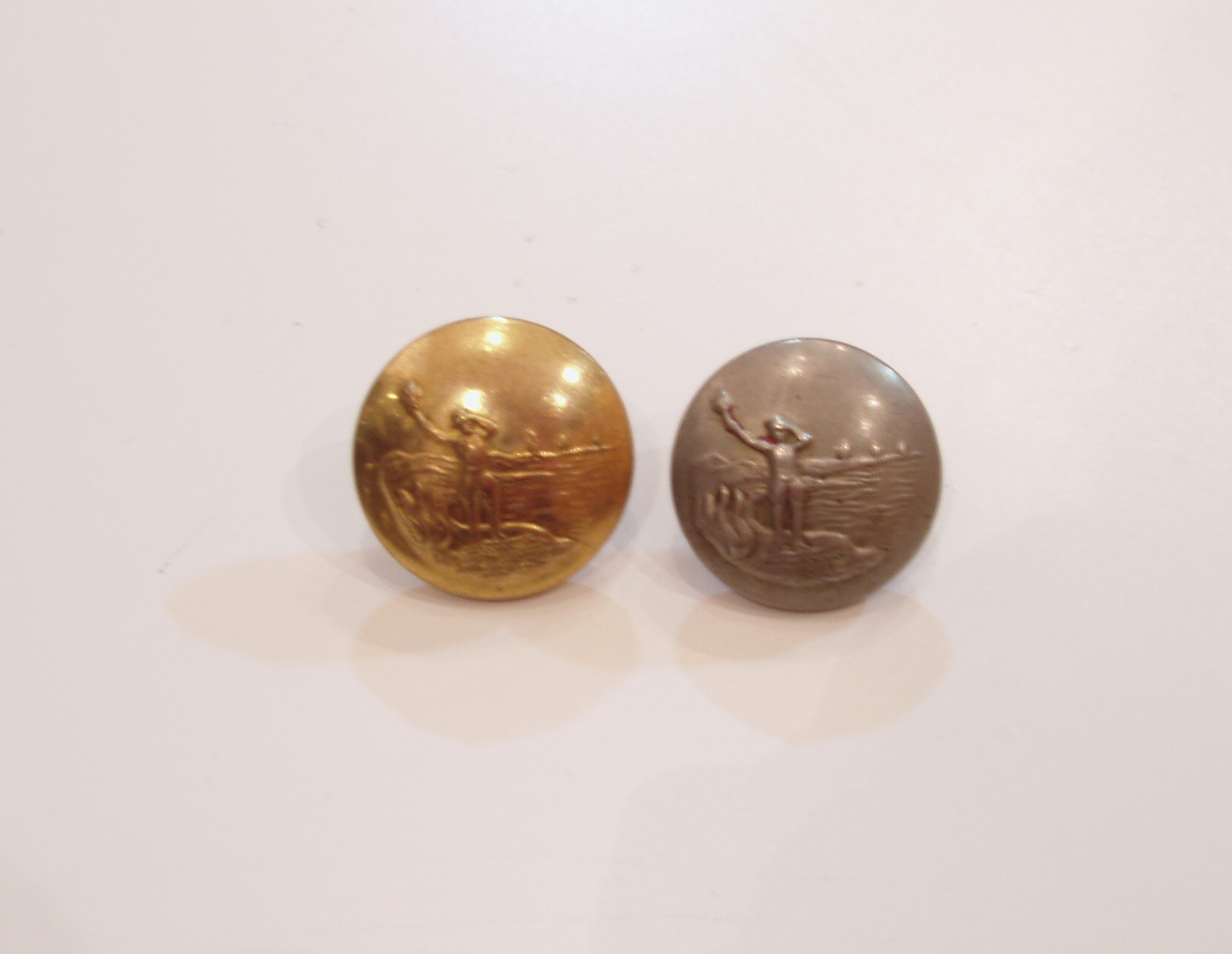
ROC metal tunic buttons (gilt Officer's button 3 mm larger in diameter), depicting the Elizabethan Beacon Lighter in a coastal setting.

RAF Forage cap and WRAF Pillbox hat, worn as optional No. 2 Dress headwear. (Forage cap with Officer's gilt buttons/badge).

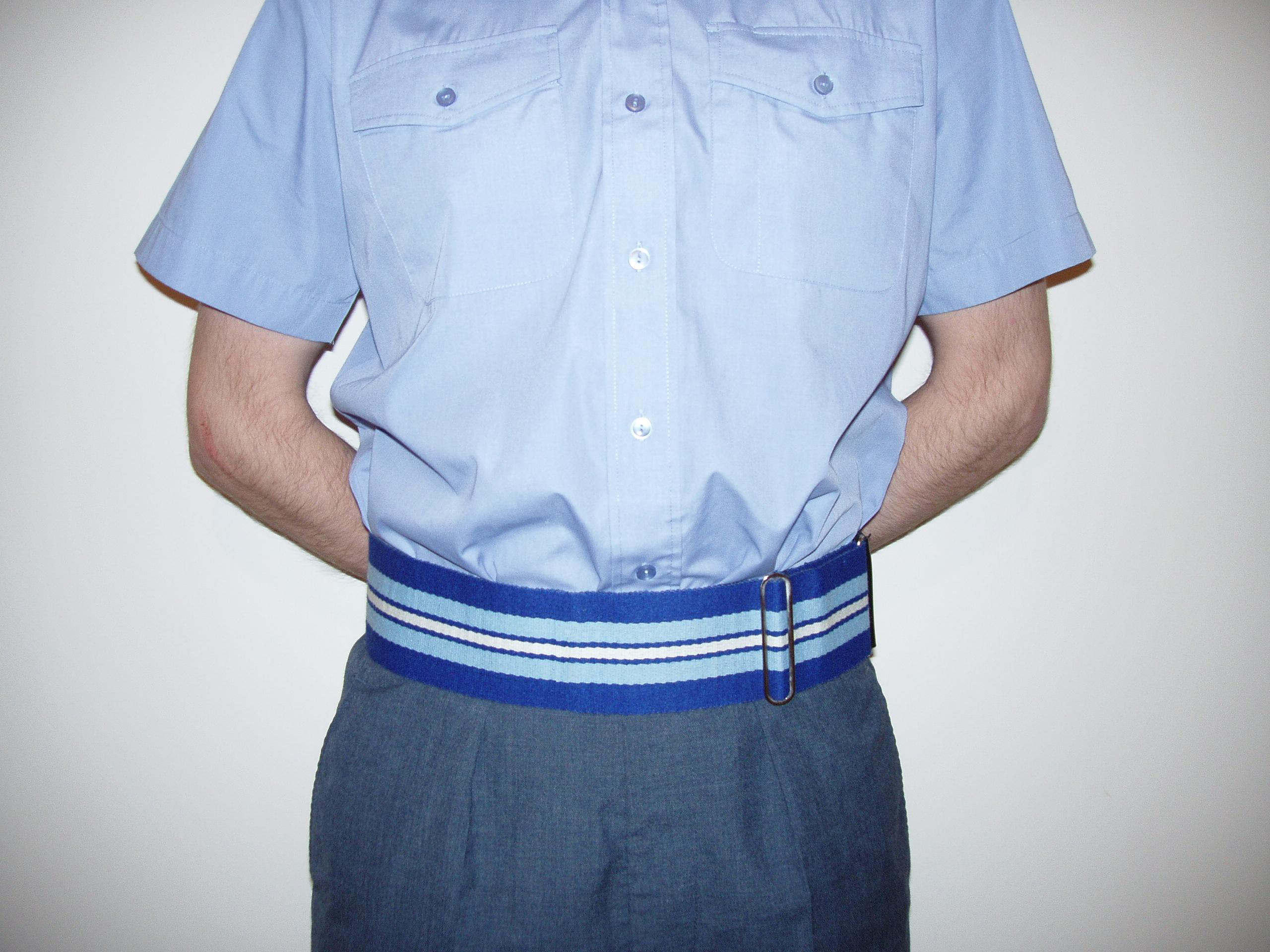
ROC stable belt, incorporating the colours of the ROC medal ribbon, worn with service working dress 2b, (short-sleeve order).

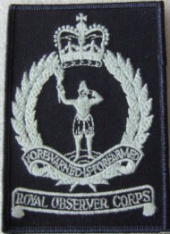
1986 pattern badge, worn on the right breast of RAF green coveralls; both badge and coveralls were issued only to Post personnel.

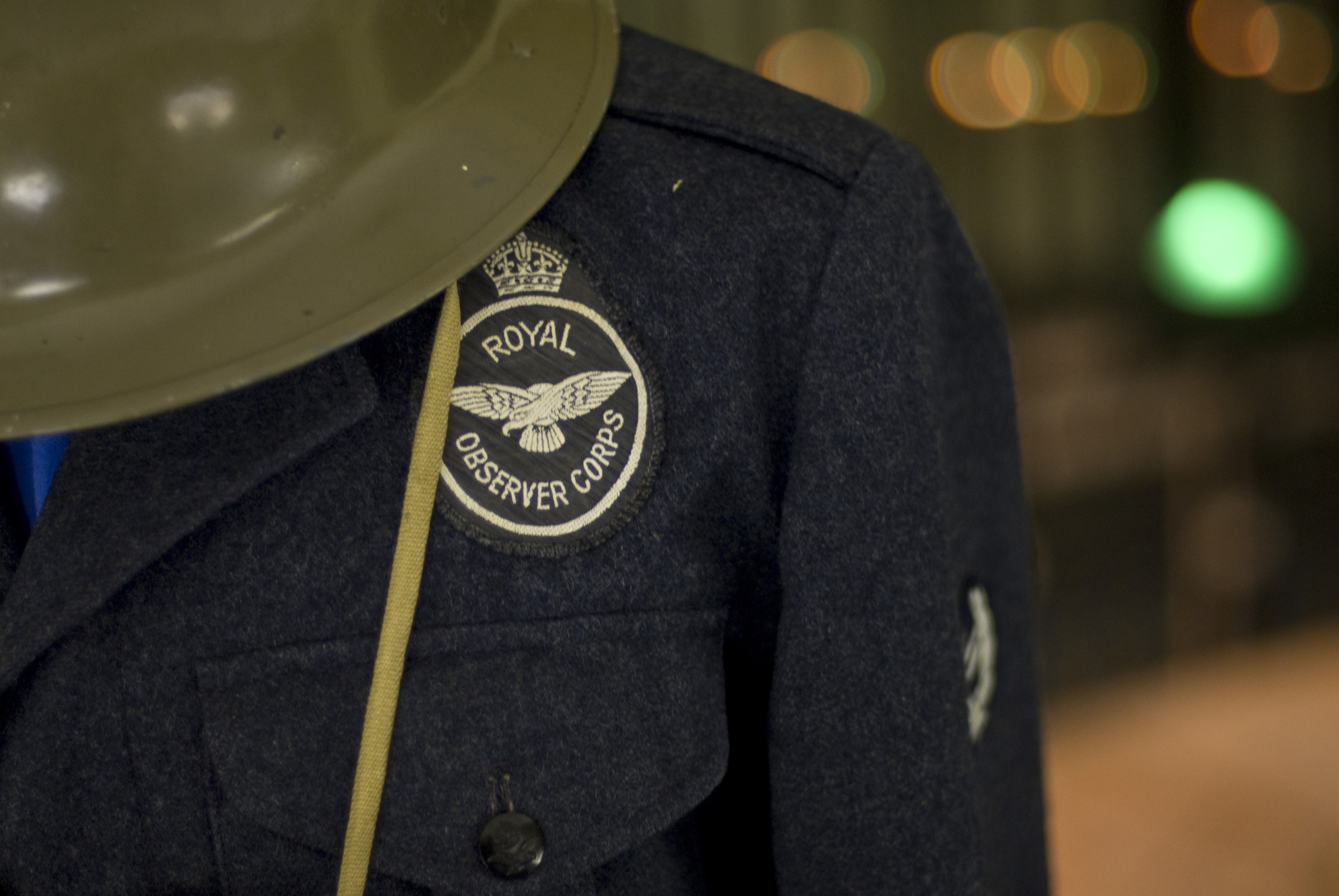
1941/1950 pattern badge, known as the “soup plate” due to its shape/size (worn on the left breast of blue coveralls and No.2 Battledress blouse).

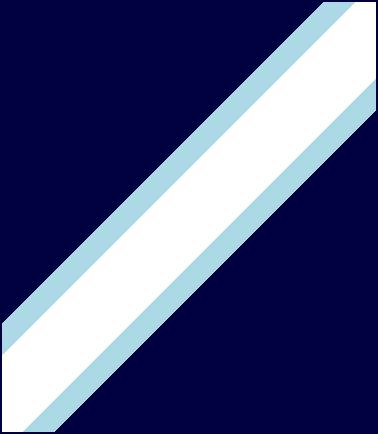
WWII helmet flash applied to (green) Brodie helmets; replacing pre-1941 Observer Corps (black) helmets stencilled with "O.C.”.

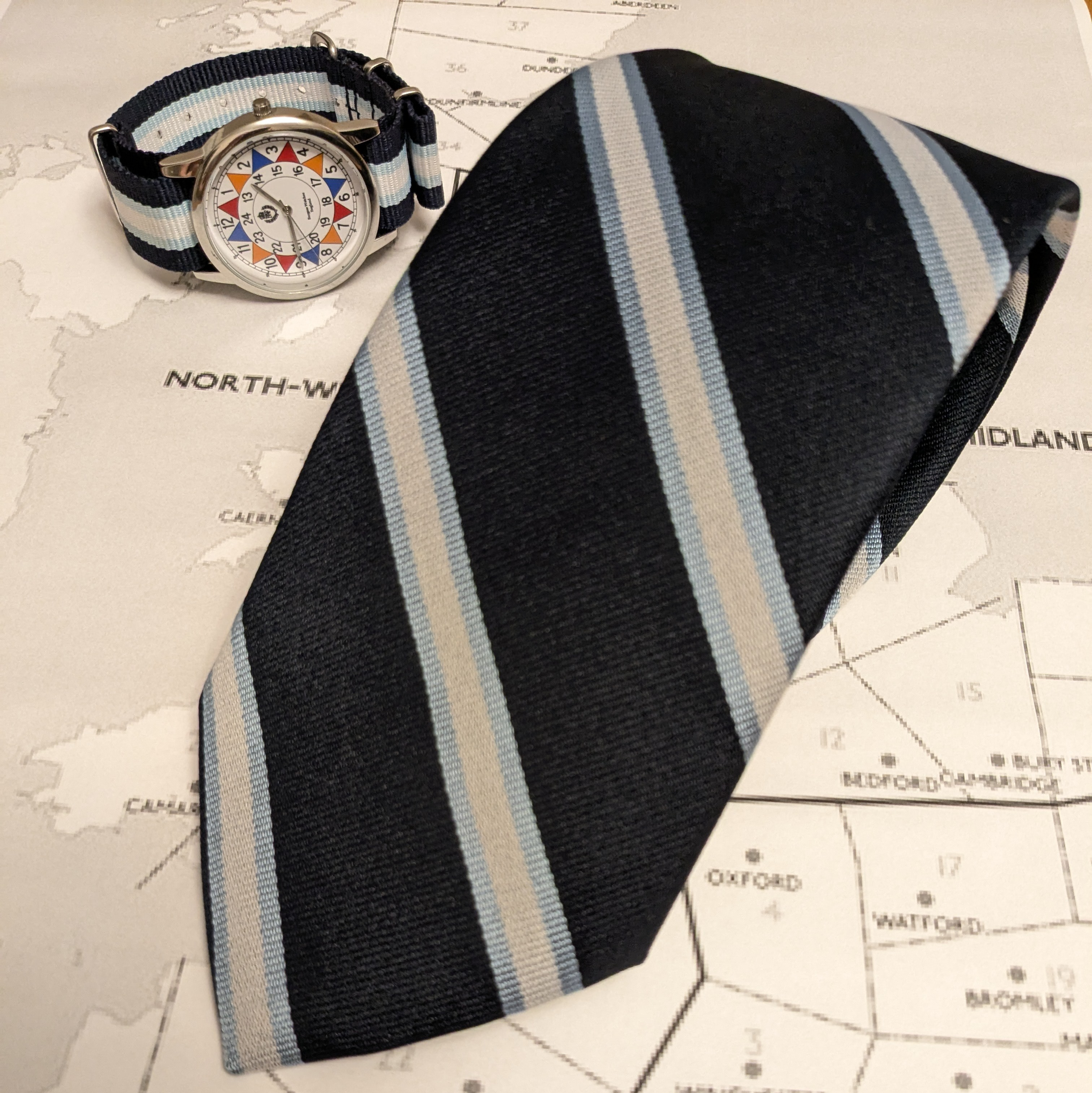
ROC regimental tie, worn with civilian clothing. (Matching regimental stripe NATO watch strap adorns a Sector clock themed wristwatch).

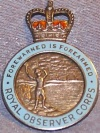
Post-1953 lapel badge worn with civilian clothing (pre-1968 badges were hallmarked sterling silver; later versions were cast metal).

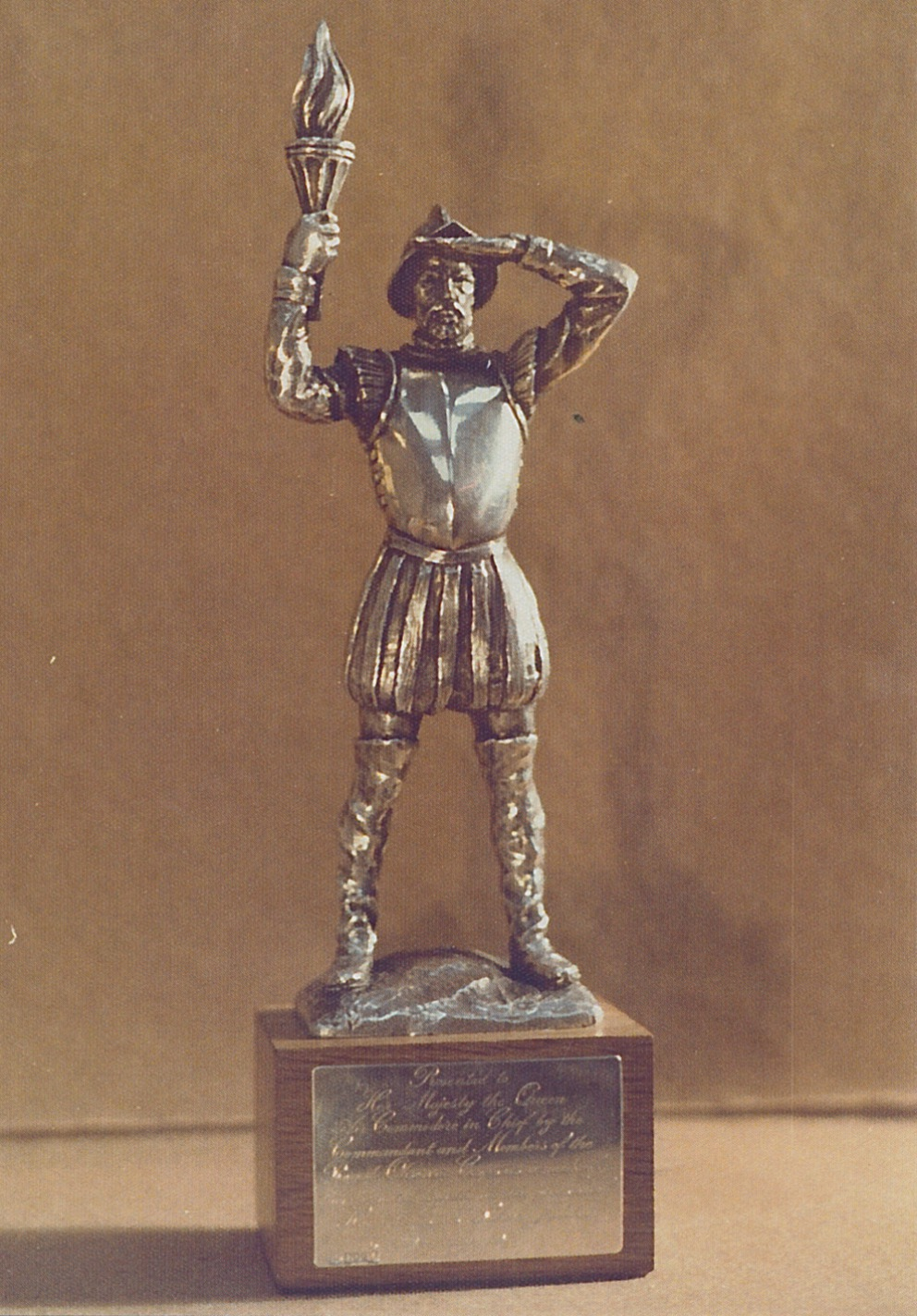
Beacon Lighter trophy. Presented to Queen Elizabeth II, as Air Commodore in Chief, to mark the 60th anniversary of the Corps in 1985.

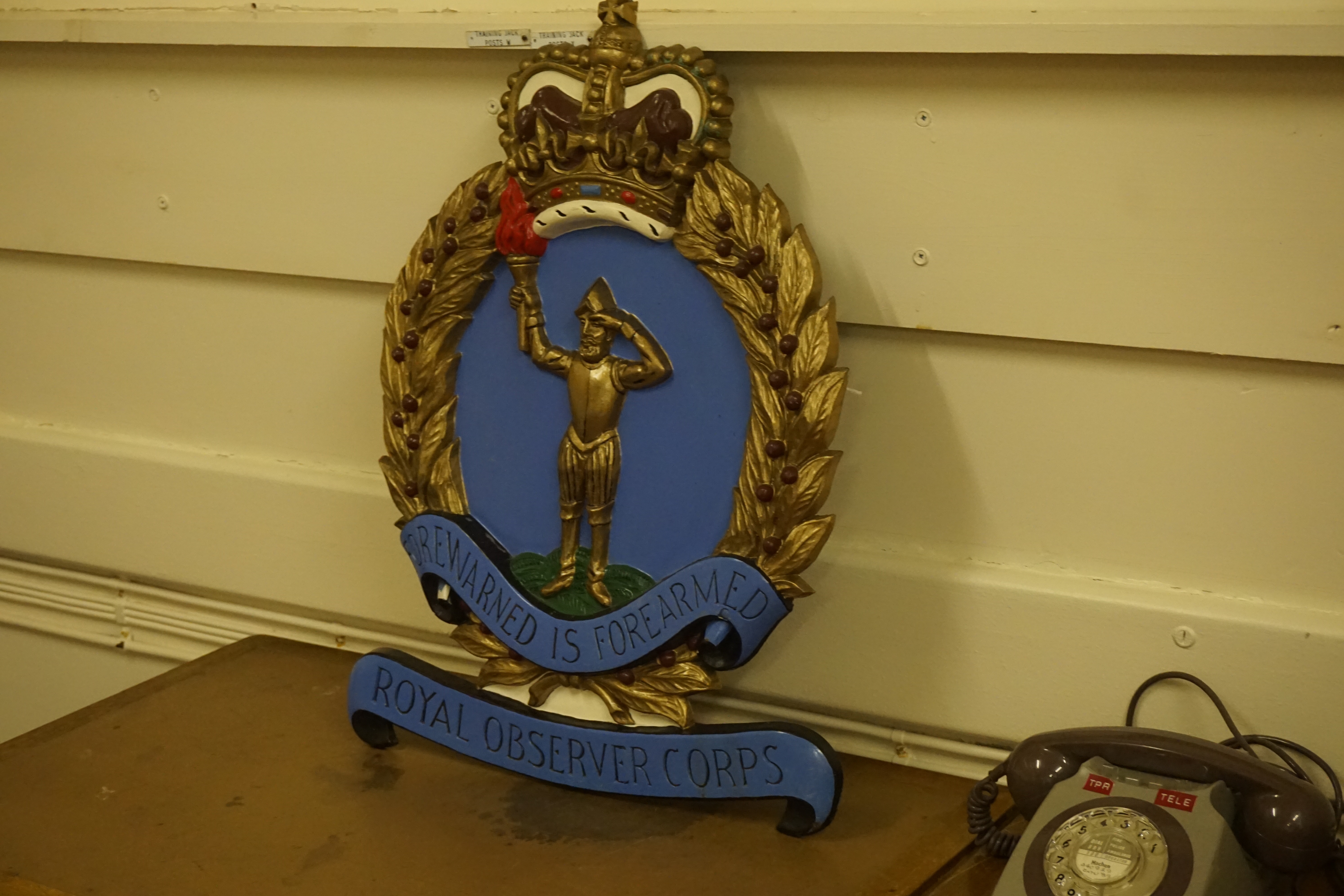
Full colour, moulded, ROC crest, located at Group HQ, No. 20 (York) Group.

== Annual training ==
=== Exercises ===
ROC Training Manual, (1979)

Several major war simulation exercises were held each year: 2 x WARMON (Warning and Monitoring) one-day UK exercises, and the two-day INTEX (International exercise) along with other NATO countries.

Four times a year minor and limited exercises called POSTEX were held on a stop – start basis across three evenings of a week, Monday to Wednesday. Realistic simulation material was provided for realtime simulations of a nuclear attack.

Approximately every four or five years each group was subjected to a "no notice" and in depth "OPEVAL" assessment similar to an RAF "TACEVAL" or Tactical Evaluation, where a mixed team of UKWMO and ROC full-time staff would appear and evaluate all aspects of the group's planning and operations under realistic wartime conditions over a period of 48 hours.

=== Annual summer training camps ===
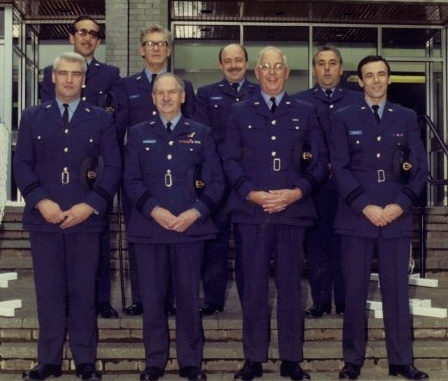
A typical ROC Summer Camp cadre and staff, comprising: Camp Commandant; Adjutant; Supply Officer; Entertainments Officer; Course Directors (4)

After the concept was first introduced in 1948 by the then Commandant ROC (Air Cdre Percy Bernard, 5th Earl of Bandon), annual summer training camps were held to enable spare-time volunteers, while spending a week in uniform at an RAF station, to attend a series of lectures, training courses and social events. A series of six to eight training camps would be held annually, with approximately 500 to 600 spare-time observers attending each week. Ranks below those of officer would be accommodated in vacant barracks block accommodation, while officers would be accommodated in the station Officers' Mess. Vacant offices and aircraft hangars would be converted into temporary training facilities.

A core team of instructors, provided with pre-formatted lesson plans, would be drawn from those spare-time officers present, who in turn would be supervised by a team of up to nine full-time officers. Full-time officers would be present for the duration of the summer programme of training camps, one of which being appointed as Camp Entertainments Officer; organising events including social dances, visits to local places of interest and an end of camp grand raffle. On the last full day of each camp, a Cabinet Minister or senior RAF officer of the rank of Air Vice-Marshal or above would visit to inspect a Guard of Honour, tour the training facilities and address the assembled personnel.

A typical camp's day-to-day programme would consist of:

Sunday – Afternoon arrival of junior officers and volunteer NCO instructors.

Monday – Instructors spend day familiarising and rehearsing. Students arrive during afternoon. Formal evening opening assembly, (in uniform), followed by 'Meet and Greet' in the NAAFI club.

Tuesday – Morning parade. Lessons from 0900 to 1730, with one hour break for lunch. Evening free, with optional coach trips to local places of interest and entertainment venues.

Wednesday – Morning parade. Lessons from 0900 to 1200. Afternoon and evening free, with optional coach trips to local places of interest and entertainment venues.

Thursday – Morning parade. Lessons from 0900 to 1730, with one hour break for lunch. Evening free, with optional coach trips to local places of interest and entertainment venues.

Friday – Morning parade followed by VIP visit; Guard of Honour, tour of training area and VIP address. Afternoon lessons followed by closing assembly and grand raffle. Evening farewell social dance in NAAFI Club.

Saturday – Morning dispersal.

Initially it was not difficult for RAF stations operating on a 'care and maintenance' basis or between squadron deployments to accommodate a seasonal influx of ROC personnel. During their first few years of operation, ROC annual summer training camps had even taken place entirely under canvas. In later years, reductions in RAF manpower resulted in there being vacant accommodation and training facilities at most RAF stations in the UK, including those home to front-line operational units such as RAF Scampton and RAF Waddington. The final camp venue at RAF Watton had actually closed in 1990 and was supported by a skeleton staff of caterers, stewards and RAF Regiment security patrols, all of which were drafted in from nearby RAF stations.

There were no camps held during 1966 and 1991, when up to 3,000 observers gathered instead for Royal Reviews and garden parties at RAF Bentley Priory. In 1986, and for the only time in the history of ROC annual summer training camps, the RAF was unable to provide an RAF station capable of providing the facilities and accommodation required. The ROC then took the unusual step of locating the camp at the Medical Faculty within Newcastle University, with observers being accommodated in student halls of residence. A temporary bar facility was added to the senior lecturers' dining room, which itself functioned as an officer's mess.

Until 1984 the camp training programme consisted of approximately twenty lessons, each concerned with distinct and unrelated subjects. From 1985 onwards, the training syllabus was reorganised as a series of five or six concentrated mini-courses concerned with specific subjects which observers would study throughout the entire week, thus permitting individual subjects to be taught in greater detail. Subjects included Techniques of Instruction (TOI), First Aid, Triangulation, Transition to War (TTW) and Communications Management. UKWMO Assistant Sector Controllers provided a 'Warning Officers' course for control observers, detailing the UKWMO Warning Team's role and responsibilities in the event of war.

==== Training camp venues ====
Year	Summer Camp Location	.	Year	Summer Camp Location	.	Year	Summer Camp Location	.	Year	Summer Camp Location	.	Year	Summer Camp Location
1948	RAF Thorney Island		1949	RAF Thorney Island		1950	RAF Waterbeach		1951	RAF Waterbeach		1952	RAF Waterbeach
1953	RAF Waterbeach		1954	RAF Waterbeach		1955	RAF Stradishall		1956	RAF Wattisham		1957	RAF Tangmere
1958	RAF West Malling		1959	RAF West Malling		1960	RAF Binbrook		1961	RAF Binbrook		1962	RAF Horsham St Faith
1963	RAF West Raynham		1964	RAF Newton		1965	RAF Weeton		1966	Royal Review – No camp held		1967	RAF Coningsby
1968	RAF Honington		1969	RAF Watton		1970	RAF Watton		1971	RAF West Raynham		1972	RAF Brawdy
1973	RAF Lindholme		1974	RAF Lindholme		1975	RAF Colerne		1976	RAF Little Rissington		1977	RAF Cosford
1978	RAF Cosford		1979	RAF Cosford		1980	RAF West Raynham		1981	RAF West Raynham		1982	RAF West Raynham
1983	RAF Scampton		1984	RAF Scampton		1985	RAF Leeming		1986	Newcastle University		1987	RAF Waddington
1988	RAF Waddington		1989	RAF Watton		1990	RAF Watton		1991	Royal Review – No camp held		1992	Corps Stood Down

=== Joint training events ===
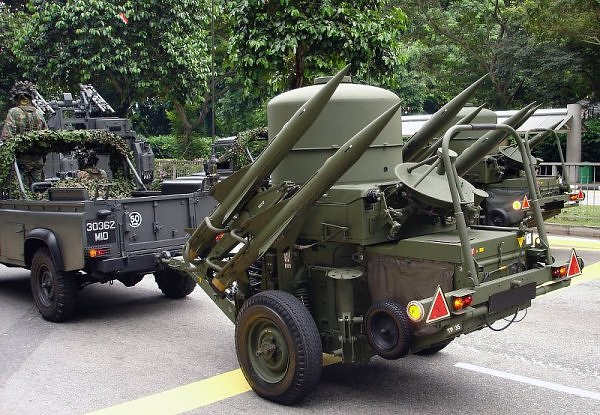
Example of a towed Rapier Missile system

On at least one occasion during the mid-1980s, ROC personnel were briefly called upon to resume their historic role in visually identifying aircraft for the purpose of air defence. The Royal Artillery, conducting exercises at the Otterburn Training Area involving the deployment of the Rapier surface-to-air missile, invited personnel from the ROC to assist Rapier crews with aircraft identification. The exercises involved both rotary and fixed-wing aircraft conducting simulated attacks on high-value ground targets, the defence of which was tasked to the Rapier crews.

Early versions of the Rapier missile system relied heavily upon the optical acquisition of targets and also suffered problems with the Identification Friend or Foe (IFF) system. The avoidance of friendly fire incidents required an advanced level of aircraft recognition skills on the part of Rapier crews; a skill which those ROC personnel selected to attend deftly demonstrated and in turn passed on to those Rapier crews of the Royal Engineers to which they were assigned.

== Similar voluntary organisations overseas ==
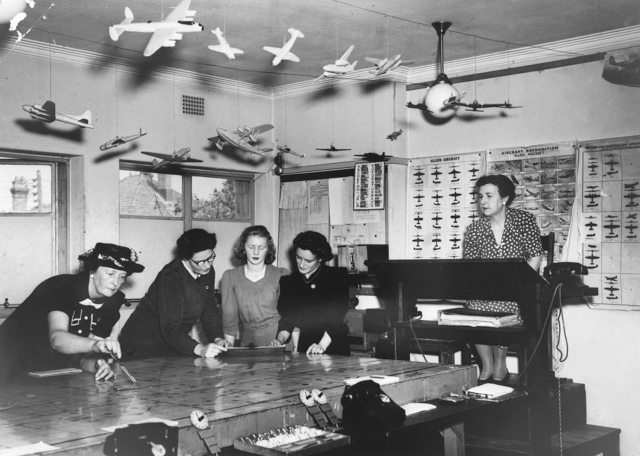
Volunteer Air Observers Corps of Australia during 1944

Organisations similar to the ROC were formed elsewhere during the Second World War, including the Ground Observer Corps (USA), the Aircraft Identity Corps (Canada), and the Volunteer Air Observers Corps (Australia). However, unlike the Royal Observer Corps, most of these organisations had been disbanded by the end of the 1950s.

Following the Second World War, the Danish Home Guard also sought to develop an organisation with a similar role to that of the ROC. Links were formed by the ROC with the Luftmeldekorpset (LMK), the Danish Air Reporting Corps, which also performed a similar nuclear warning role in Denmark whilst retaining the aircraft recognition role due to the proximity of Warsaw Pact countries. Aircraft recognition competitions between the LMK and ROC took place annually until 1991, despite the ROC no longer having an operational role of aircraft recognition. Honours remained roughly even over the history of the competitions, with the four-man ROC team taking the trophy in the final contest. Liaison visits to the LMKHQ proved popular, particularly as it was located in the basement of the main Carlsberg brewery in Copenhagen, with the LMK mess having free lager piped direct from the factory above. (The LMK was disbanded in 2004.)

== Stand-down and legacy ==
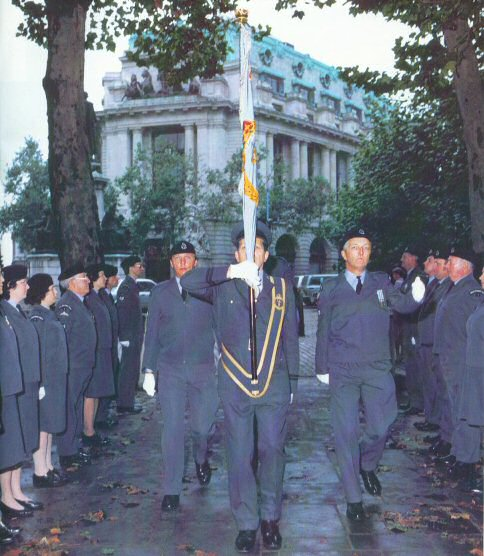
The 1966 Royal Banner being marched into St Clement Danes and laid up on 29 September 1991.

Following the 1990 defence spending review Options for Change, the main field force of the ROC's monitoring post and group control personnel was stood down on 30 September 1991. The previous day, the original 1966 ROC Royal Banner was laid up at St Clement Danes Church, London, with attending ROC personnel conducting a slow march (Skywatch being the ROC regimental quick march) while carrying the banner to its final resting place, where it remains on display. (A replacement banner had been presented previously by Queen Elizabeth II at a Royal Review of the ROC in July 1991.) The ROC, along with the UKWMO, was officially disestablished following what was described by The Queen at the 1991 Royal Review as "the end of the Cold War". This move was linked to a Government press release which referred to "possible future developments and improvements in automated nuclear explosion and fallout detection from remote sensors".

Of the remaining 170 full-time ROC uniformed and civilian staff, many were transferred to other appointments within the Ministry of Defence and other UK Government departments, and some opted to take early retirement; however, the majority were made redundant. The Senior Administration Officer (S Ad O) and Personnel Services Officer (P Serv O) at HQROC undertook an extensive campaign of arranging relocation or retirement courses for staff from all over the UK. The S Ad O and an Observer Lieutenant remained in post to administer the reduced ROC contingent under a revised RAF structure. A massive exercise in recalling instruments, equipment, furniture and stores from all monitoring posts and controls took place over a period of nine months, controlled by the HQROC Supply Officer. Arrangements were made with the Ministry of Defence and RAF Historical Branch to archive ROC files, documents and historical memorabilia at various locations across the country.

Only the Nuclear Reporting Cell (NRC) elements of the ROC remained in service which, working alongside major armed forces headquarters, themselves entered a new and highly uncertain phase. Reduced to fewer than 260 members, the 16 retained NRCs now found themselves tasked with the challenge of providing a comprehensive Nuclear, Biological and Chemical (NBC) warfare analysis and warning service for the Military Home Commands, on a reserve-manned basis as NBCCs but operating without the countrywide flow of data from posts and controls.

The removal of Home Office involvement in the ROC from 1991 onwards resulted in those "Remnant Elements" becoming effectively a single reserve Directly Administered Unit within RAF Strike Command (RAFSTC). For the final four years of its existence the role of Commandant ROC became a secondary appointment held by the Senior Air Staff Officer (SASO) of No. 11 Group RAF. All remaining members of the ROC were required to remove their original ROC Group designations from their RAF uniforms, and accept moves towards changes in conditions of service during any Transition-To-War (TTW) which would make them effectively members of the Royal Auxiliary Air Force (RAuxAF), with protected rights. As a direct result, closer links were forged between the ROC and war-appointable flights of the Royal Air Force Volunteer Reserve (RAFVR).

Despite having successfully built upon the extensive NBC reporting trials, undertaken with the RAF Regiment, and meeting full NATO standards and evaluations (STANAGs and OPEVALs), the conclusion reached by the UK MoD was that retention of the ROC in its NBC Cell role was "desirable, but not essential in the existing format". As a consequence, the remaining part-time members of the ROC were stood down on 31 December 1995, following the laying-up ceremony conducted for the 1991 ROC Royal Banner in the Rotunda at RAF College Cranwell on 8 December 1995, where it remains on display alongside other stood-down Air Force units and squadrons which remain subject to possible future reactivation. Headquarters ROC at RAF Bentley Priory finally closed on 31 March 1996, after all administrative winding up tasks were completed. Assisted by the Senior ROC Officer (SROCO), Observer Commander N A Greig, MBE, the honour of being the last Commandant of the ROC fell to Air Commodore Martin K Widdowson RAF, who held the position jointly with his appointment as Senior Air Staff Officer (SASO) of the newly combined No. 11/18 Group RAF.

=== After the Corps ===
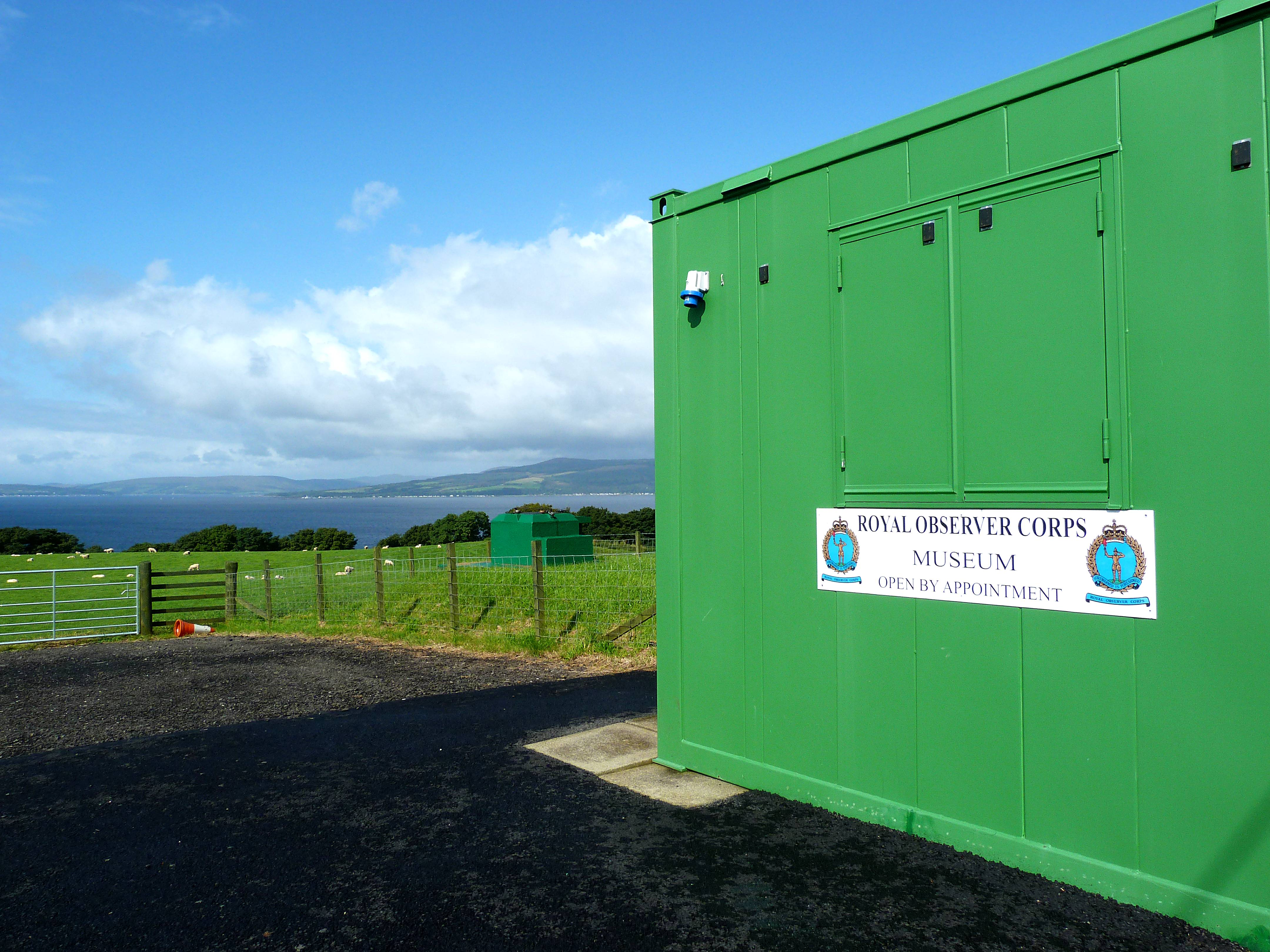
Skelmorlie ROC Post Museum

Several monitoring posts across the UK have since been bought or leased, re-equipped and opened to the public as museums. Some posts situated in scenic rural locations have proved popular with those seeking permanent locations for holiday caravans, e.g.the mostly intact Penrith monitoring post in the Carlisle group was sold at auction in April 2008 for £182,000.

The majority of control buildings have been sold into private ownership and demolished or converted to other uses, such as 17 Group Wrexham (which became a recording studio), 16 Group Shrewsbury (a veterinary hospital) and 1 Group Maidstone (a solicitor's storage archive). Several others still remain, albeit for the most part abandoned and derelict. There are two notable exceptions. 20 Group York's semi-sunken control building has been adopted by English Heritage as a museum of the ROC and its Cold War activities, and is open to the public. 28 Group Dundee's control bunker is managed by 28 Group Observed (SCIO) and has been restored to its 1991 condition. The York museum closed for several months during 2008, when an unknown mould was discovered in the data centre, but reopened in October after investigations showed the mould to be harmless. It was forced to close again in August 2015 for one month due to serious flooding after a prolonged period of heavy rain.

RAF Bentley Priory, home of HQROC for the entire history of the Royal Observer Corps, closed in May 2008. It was to be developed as a private hotel or luxury apartments, but with the historic officers' mess rooms and a selection of ROC items retained as a public museum. With effect from July 2011, the ROC Museum, Winchester, assumed responsibility from the MoD for the maintenance, storage and dissemination of information relating to ROC Service Records of those individuals who served with the Corps.

=== ROC Association ===
Royal Observer Corps Association logo

In 1986 the Royal Observer Corps Association (ROCA) was established with membership open to members of the ROC to provide close and continuing links between former ROC members. The association is organised on a regional basis with representation in each of the twenty-five groups. Each group produces and distributes a magazine several times a year to keep the membership informed of developments and both local or national news.

The stated aims of the association are:

To maintain esprit de corps and promote comradeship among ex-Corps members.

To help ex-Corps members and their dependants in need, to obtain assistance from the Royal Observer Corps Benevolent Fund (absorbed into the RAF Benevolent Fund in November 2017).

To raise money for the Benevolent Fund.

To give support to any future re-establishment of the Royal Observer Corps as a voluntary organisation.

To represent the interests of members with other national organisations.

To preserve the heritage of the Royal Observer Corps including memorabilia and artifacts.

The association has actively continued since the ROC disbanded and still provides an additional contact point for ex-observers and their dependents. The ROCA also organises the annual reunion weekend each October at a suitable holiday resort hotel, and also provides an ROC contingent to attend the annual National Service of Remembrance, at the Cenotaph in London, on Remembrance Sunday.

Many control and post crews have formed sub-groups of the ROCA and have continued to meet on a weekly or monthly basis throughout the years since the initial stand-down in 1991. Meeting at local Royal Air Forces Association Clubs or hotels, they invite visiting speakers, or arrange visits to local places of interest. Local ROCA members turn out for Remembrance Sunday and parades all over the country, with former members being permitted to wear the ROC beret and cap badge, together with any medals.

During early 2008, ROCA 17 Group (North Wales) and 4 Group (Colchester) seceded from the national organisation. Both groups rejoined the association in 2012.

=== Commemorating 'The Corps' ===
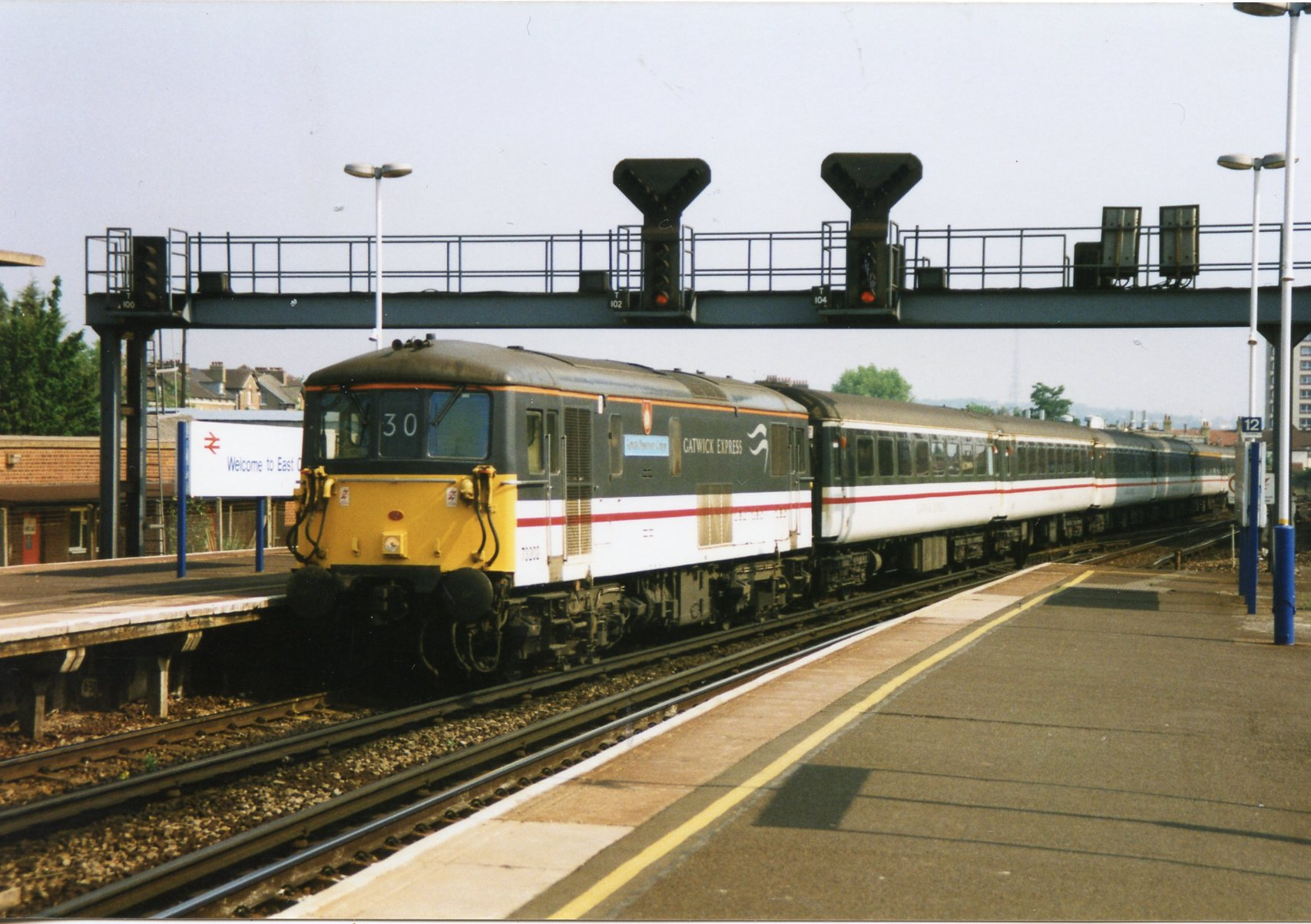
Marking the corps' 60th anniversary, BR locomotive No.73137, (refurbished as No.73202), was named, (1985-1999), "Royal Observer Corps".

On 12 September 2008, a replica of a No. 41 Squadron Spitfire MkIIA, wearing the "Observer Corps" badge and title, was installed as gate guardian at RAF High Wycombe. The original aircraft on which the replica is based; EB-Z ser. no P7666, was the personal aircraft of Sqn/Ldr Donald Finlay, Commanding Officer of No. 41 Squadron at RAF Hornchurch. This aircraft being one of two which Observer Corps personnel raised sufficient funds in order to purchase for the RAF at the start of World War II. (In 2010 a BAe Harrier GR9A was adorned with the tail code EB-Z and title "Observer Corps" in order to mark the 70th anniversary of the Battle of Britain. Harrier ZG857 displayed these additional markings during the months which preceded the type's retirement from RAF/RN service in March 2011. The aircraft was subsequently sold to the United States Department of Defense and was stored at the 309th Aerospace Maintenance and Regeneration Group (AMARG), at Davis-Monthan AFB, prior to being scrapped in August 2023).

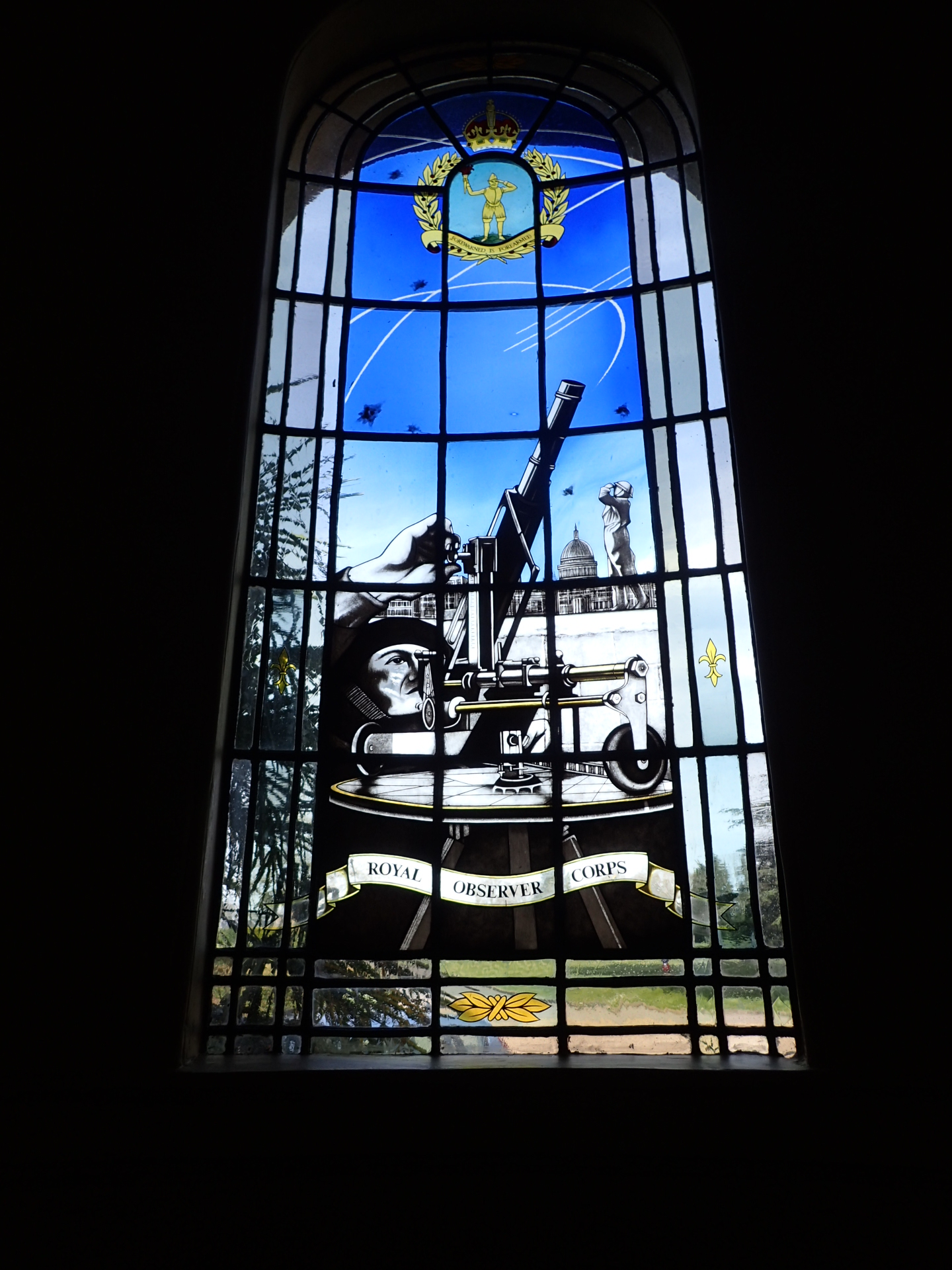
ROC stained glass window, RAF Bentley Priory.

The ROC has twice been commemorated by the naming of railway locomotives. Constructed in 1946, the Battle of Britain class steam locomotive no.34050 was named "Royal Observer Corps" in February 1948, and was presented with an ROC Long Service Medal ribbon at Waterloo station on 2 July 1961 by Air Commodore C M Wight-Boycott. Withdrawn from service and scrapped in 1965, the locomotive's nameplate survived and now forms part of the collection at the RAF Museum. Constructed in 1966, the British Rail Class 73 electro-diesel locomotive no.73137 was from 1985 until 1999 named "Royal Observer Corps". Marking the 60th anniversary of the founding of the Corps, Air Chief Marshal Sir David Craig undertook the naming ceremony at Waterloo Station on 30 October 1985.

Several Group Control surface buildings which were demolished to make way for private housing developments have been commemorated by the naming of streets, including Observer Court, Prestwick, Observer Close, Truro, and Observer Close, Bedford. The area of housing development at Kennet Heath, Thatcham, on the former site of RAF Thatcham, (until 1999 a distribution facility owned by the Defence Communication Services Agency), includes Observer Drive among the military-themed street names of the David Wilson Homes development. Royal Observer Way forms the access road to the Tesco superstore in Seaton, Devon.

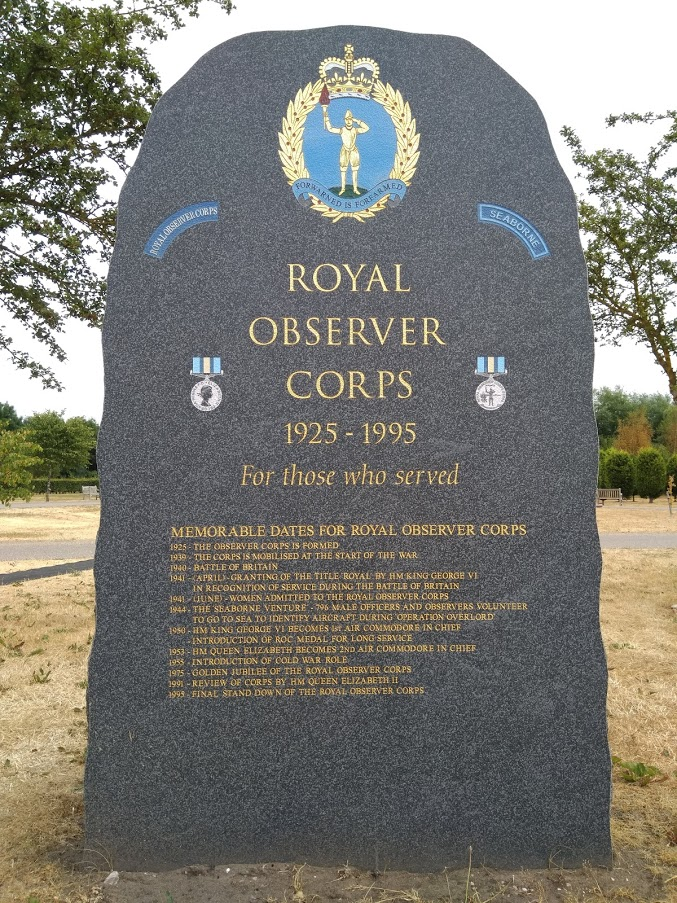
ROC commemorative stone at the NMA, Alrewas

The Royal Banner, (displayed at Saint Clement Danes Church), the stained glass window at (RAF) Bentley Priory, those former posts, group controls, MoD bunkers and other sites operating as museums, and those individuals who attend memorial parades and other events as members of the ROC Association, continue to provide a link to the ROC and its distinguished past roles in contributing to the defence of the United Kingdom of Great Britain and Northern Ireland, during both World War II and the Cold War which followed.

The ROC and those who have served throughout its history, including those who undertook to participate in Seaborne operations during World War II, are commemorated at the National Memorial Arboretum, where members of the ROC Association regularly hold commemorative events and undertake practical grounds maintenance of the ROC grove.

== See also ==
=== ROC articles ===
- Commandant Royal Observer Corps
- List of ROC Group Headquarters and UKWMO Sector controls
- List of Royal Observer Corps / United Kingdom Warning and Monitoring Organisation Posts
- Operational instruments of the Royal Observer Corps
- RAF Bentley Priory
- Royal Observer Corps Medal
- Royal Observer Corps Monitoring Post
- Skywatch march
- United Kingdom Warning and Monitoring Organisation

=== Duties and methods ===
- Aircraft recognition
- Bomb Power Indicator
- Dowding system
- Fixed Survey Meter
- Four-minute warning
- Ground Zero Indicator

=== Similar organisations ===
- Aircraft Detection Corps Newfoundland
- Aircraft Identity Corps (Canada)
- Civil Air Patrol (USA)
- Ground Observer Corps (USA)
- Luftmeldekorpset
- Volunteer Air Observers Corps (Australia)
