= Royal Observer Corps Medal =

Long service medal for members of the Royal Observer Corps

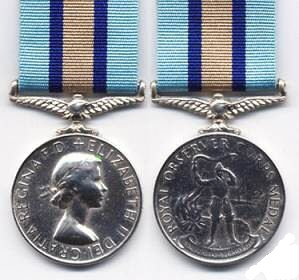
- Obverse and reverse of the medal
- Type: Long service medal
- Awarded for: 12 Years Service
- Presented by: United Kingdom
- Eligibility: Royal Observer Corps personnel
- Clasps: For each further 12 years service
- Established: 1950
- First award: 1953
- Final award: 1995
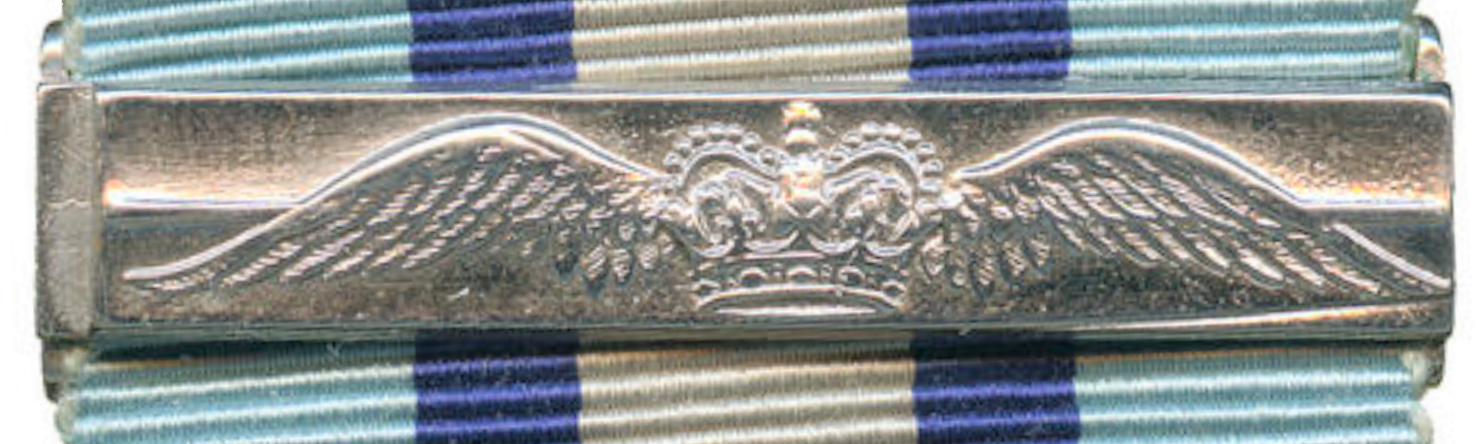
- Second award clasp Ribbon bar of the medal

United Kingdom Order of Wear
- Next (higher): Canadian Forces' Decoration
- Next (lower): Civil Defence Medal Long Service Medal

The Royal Observer Corps Medal was instituted in 1950 by King George VI for long service by members of the Royal Observer Corps (ROC) in the United Kingdom. It was awarded until December 1995, when the ROC was stood down.

== Service prior to 1939 ==
Prior to World War II, Observer Corps personnel were classed as Special Constables, retained by local constabularies, and qualified for the Special Constabulary Long Service Medal following nine years of continuous service. This qualification ceased in August 1939 when RAF Fighter Command assumed sole responsibility for the ROC. However, service as a Special Constable on observer duties prior to August 1939 counted towards the ROC Medal, provided it had not already been reflected in an award of the Special Constabulary Long Service Medal.

== The new medal ==
In 1950, King George VI, as Air Commodore in Chief of the ROC, granted permission for the award of the Royal Observer Corps Medal in recognition of long service. For part-time personnel, the medal was awarded for twelve years of continuous service. Each subsequent period of twelve years of service was recognised by the award of a clasp depicting a winged crown. On ribbon bars, a silver rosette was worn to represent each clasp. Peacetime service by full-time salaried ROC Officers counted for half the qualification period for part-time personnel, therefore requiring up to twenty-four years of service to qualify for a medal or clasp, but with any previous war or part-time service counting in full.

== Description ==
=== Medal ===
The medal was die-struck in cupronickel metal featuring the laureated head of Elizabeth II. Post-1953 medals featured the legend +ELIZABETH II DEI GRA:BRITT:OMN:REGINA F:D:, (+ELIZABETH·II·DEI·GRATIA·REGINA·F:D: from the mid-1950s), on the obverse. The reverse features the Elizabethan beacon lighter figure from the ROC badge, depicted against a backdrop of coastal warning beacons, with the motto FOREWARNED IS FOREARMED on a scroll beneath the figure, together with the words ROYAL OBSERVER CORPS MEDAL around the circumference. The medal was suspended under an articulated bar depicting the RAF eagle. Although the medal was authorised in 1950, the first award was only made in 1953, and none were struck with the effigy of King George VI.

The medal was awarded named, with the recipient's rank, initials and surname stamped on the medal's edge, for example, OBSERVER L.F. COLLINGS.

Miniature ROC Medals were licensed and worn at formal Black Tie events where the invitation indicates such are permitted.

=== Ribbon ===
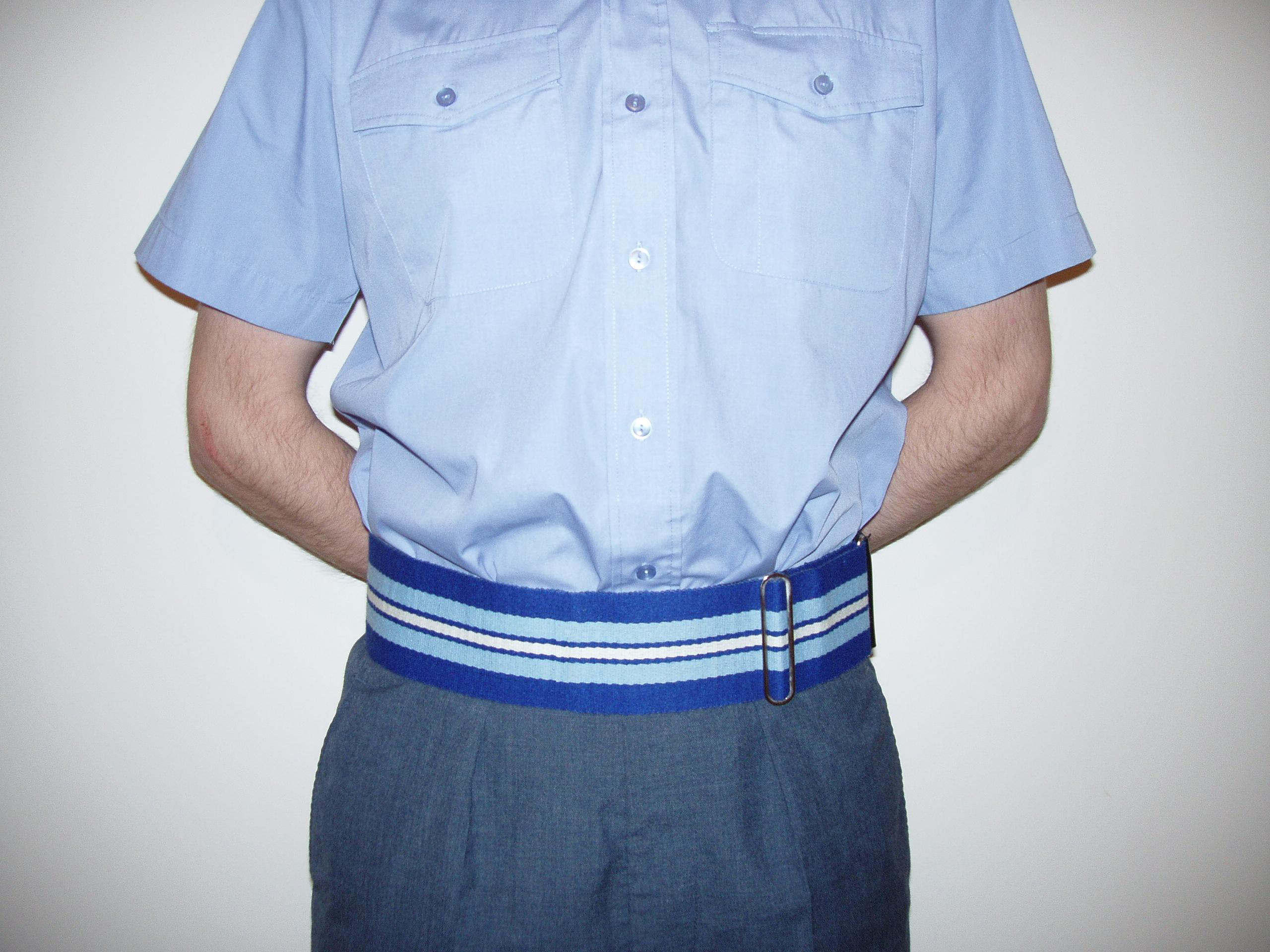
The ROC stable belt incorporates the colours of the ROC medal ribbon

The medal ribbon is pale blue, with a silver central stripe, edged in dark blue; representing the pale blue of the daytime sky, with a searchlight beam in a night sky at its centre. The colours of the ribbon were to be repeated in the ROC stable belt, with the addition of two outer stripes of dark blue. The medal ribbon's colour sequence is the reverse of that seen in the ROC regimental tie and watch strap, which themselves correspond to the pattern of the ROC unit flash applied to those steel helmets issued during World War II which were finished in green.

== Unusual awards ==
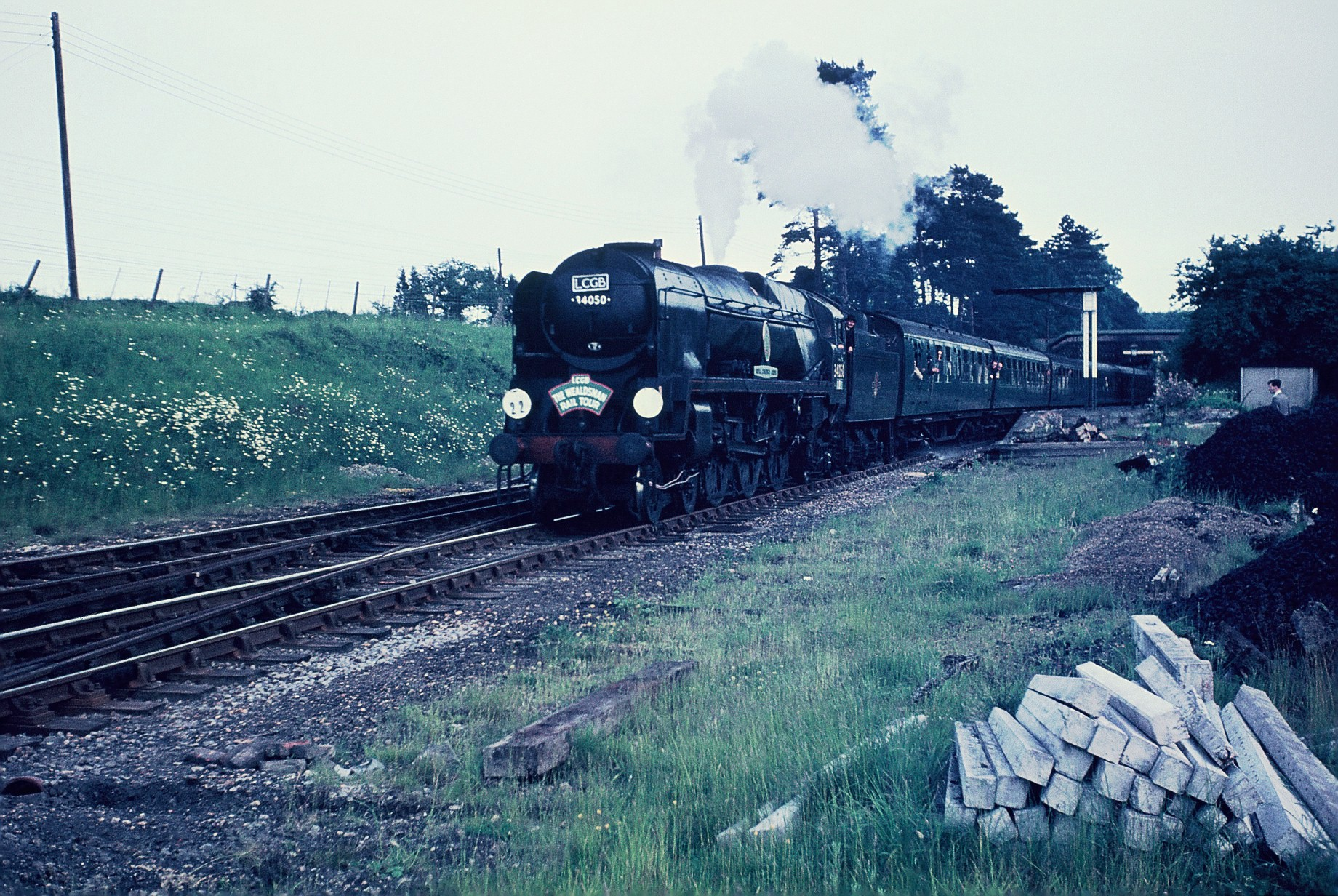
34050 Royal Observer Corps at West Grinstead station 1965

In July 1961, the Commandant ROC Air Commodore Wight-Boycott presented a Royal Observer Corps Medal to the Battle of Britain Class locomotive no.34050 Royal Observer Corps, which had commenced service with the Southern Railway Company in December 1946; the ceremony taking place at Waterloo station. The medal was mounted in a glass-fronted cabinet in the driver's cab, and the locomotive's side was repainted with a representation of the medal and its ribbon. These were displayed until the engine was retired from service and scrapped in the late 1960s. However, the original nameplate and front badge were recovered and displayed in the entrance hall of RAF Bentley Priory, (HQ ROC), until 1996, when they were transferred to the RAF Museum, Hendon.

The only occasion where an ROC Medal was awarded to a former member of the ROC was when UK Warning and Monitoring Organisation Sector Controller Kenneth Rodley was awarded the ROC Medal after twenty-four years of full-time service. Rodley commenced his ROC service as a Group Training Officer with 20 Group (York) in February 1958 and was later seconded to the Home Office in 1971. It had been realised that, due to an administrative error, Rodley's secondment had never officially converted to that of a full civil service transfer and that he had, therefore, technically remained a member of the ROC. The Medal was awarded to him by Air Commodore George Black at a surprise ceremony in 1984 at RAF Scampton. Rodley attempted to make an acceptance speech but was overcome by emotion and took his seat to a standing ovation from those present.

Two recipients have received the ROC Medal with three clasps, representing 48 years of service including earlier service as Special Constables on observer duties.

== Disestablishment ==
The ROC was stood down in December 1995, and as such, there are no ROC personnel in service. However, should the ROC ever be reactivated, the ROC medal remains extant, and awards could recommence at that time.

ROC Medals are much sought after by collectors of militaria, and examples reaching several hundred pounds have been recorded at auction.
