= Deryck Stapleton =

Royal Air Force Air Vice-Marshal (1918-2018)

- Born: 15 January 1918; Colombo, British Ceylon (now Sri Lanka)
- Died: 16 February 2018 (aged 100); Coaxdon, Axminster, Devon, England
- Relatives: Gerald Stapleton (brother)
- Military career
- Allegiance: United Kingdom
- Branch: Royal Air Force
- Service years: 1936–1968
- Rank: Air Vice Marshal
- Commands: RAF Staff College, Bracknell (1966–68); No. 1 Group (1964–66); RAF Oldenburg (1955–57); RAF Odiham (1949–52); No. 254 Wing (1944–45); No. 14 Squadron (1940–41)
- Conflicts: Second World War
- Awards: Companion of the Order of the Bath; Commander of the Order of the British Empire; Distinguished Flying Cross; Air Force Cross; Mentioned in Despatches (3)

Air Vice Marshal Deryck Cameron Stapleton, CB, CBE, DFC, AFC (15 January 1918 – 16 February 2018) was a Royal Air Force officer who served as Commandant of the RAF Staff College, Bracknell from 1966 to 1968.

== RAF career ==
Educated at King Edward VI School in Totnes, Stapleton joined the Royal Air Force in 1936. He received a short-service commission as an acting pilot officer on 13 July 1936, was regraded to pilot officer on 18 May 1937 and was promoted to flying officer on 18 November 1938. He was promoted to the acting rank of flight lieutenant on 2 March 1939, and was decorated in June with the Air Force Cross (AFC) in the 1939 Birthday Honours list.

Stapleton served in the Second World War in East Africa, the Middle East, North Africa and Italy. He was promoted to the substantive rank of flight lieutenant on 3 September 1940, by which time he was an acting squadron leader. As an acting squadron leader with No. 14 Squadron RAF, then stationed in Eritrea, he was awarded the Distinguished Flying Cross (DFC) in January 1941:

Acting Squadron Leader Deryck Cameron Stapleton, A.F.C. (37948), No. 14 Squadron. Squadron Leader Stapleton was the leader of two formations in a combined attack against a target in Eritrea. South of Massawa, they were intercepted by enemy fighters and an engine of one of our aircraft was put out of action. The pilot endeavoured to escape, but was followed by an enemy fighter and eventually forced to land in enemy territory. Squadron Leader Stapleton, having shaken off the fighters, ordered the remainder of the second formation to join up with him and successfully attacked his alternative target. He then returned to the coast to search for the missing aircraft, which was sighted and observed to crash on landing. Squadron Leader Stapleton landed alongside, and waited while the crew set fire to their papers. He then emplaned the crew in his own aircraft, and flew back to base with the rest of the formation, which had been circling overhead. Courageous leadership, skill and daring are characteristic of all this officer's operations against the enemy.

Stapleton was mentioned in despatches in 1943, and promoted to temporary wing commander on 1 January 1944. He was promoted to wing commander (war substantive) on 26 March 1945. On 1 September 1945, he was granted a permanent commission in the RAF, with the substantive rank of squadron leader (seniority from 1 June 1944).

After the war Stapleton became Assistant Secretary (Air) in 1945 and Secretary of the Chiefs of Staff Committee in 1947. With the post-war contraction of the armed forces, he relinquished his temporary rank of wing commander on 1 November 1947. As an acting group captain, Stapleton was appointed a Commander of the Order of the British Empire, Military Division (CBE) in the 1948 New Year Honours list. He was appointed as the Station Commander at RAF Odiham in 1949.

Stapleton was promoted to the substantive rank of wing commander on 1 July 1950 and to the substantive rank of group captain on 1 January 1957. He spent much of the 1950s in various military headquarters. He was appointed a Companion of the Order of the Bath, Military Division (CB) in the 1960 Birthday Honours. He was promoted to air commodore on 1 January 1961, and became Director of Plans at the Air Ministry in March 1961. He was promoted to air vice-marshal on 1 July 1963, and was appointed Director of Defence Plans at the Ministry of Defence; in May 1964 he became Air Officer Commanding No. 1 Group. After that he became Commandant of the RAF Staff College, Bracknell in June 1966 before retiring in April 1968.

== Later life ==
Stapleton died on 16 February 2018 at the age of 100.

Military offices
Preceded by Patrick Dunn	Air Officer Commanding No. 1 Group; 1964–1966	Succeeded by Michael Le Bas
Preceded by Tim Piper	Commandant of the RAF Staff College, Bracknell; 1966–1968	Succeeded by Nigel Maynard
