= John Warfield =

John Warfield may refer to:

- John N. Warfield, American systems scientist
- John Mortimer Warfield, Royal Air Force officer
