= Boddy =

Boddy is a surname of English origin. The name refers to:

- Alexander Boddy (1854–1930), English vicar of the Anglican Church; one of the founders of Pentecostalism in Britain
- Bill Boddy (1913–2011), British motoring journalist
- George Boddy (b. 1937), RAF officer
- Gregg Boddy (b. 1949), Canadian professional ice hockey player
- Ian Boddy (contemporary), British electronic musician and composer
- Manchester Boddy (1891–1967), Los Angeles newspaper publisher and Democratic senate candidate in 1950.
- Michael Boddy (1934–2014), English-Australian actor and writer
- Mr. Boddy, a character from the film Clue.
