= Derek Bryant =

Derek Bryant may refer to:

- Derek Bryant (boxer) (born 1971), American boxer
- Derek Bryant (baseball) (born 1951), American baseball player
- Derek Bryant (RAF officer) (born 1933), British Royal Air Force officer
