= Robert Peters (RAF officer) =

Royal Air Force officer

- Born: 22 August 1940 (age 86)
- Military career
- Allegiance: United Kingdom
- Branch: Royal Air Force
- Service years: 1961–93
- Rank: Air Vice Marshal
- Commands: British Forces Cyprus; RAF Staff College, Bracknell; RAF St Mawgan; No. 10 Squadron
- Awards: Companion of the Order of the Bath

Air Vice Marshal Robert Geoffrey Peters, CB (born 22 August 1940) is a former Royal Air Force officer who served as Commandant of the RAF Staff College, Bracknell.

== RAF career ==
Educated at St Paul's School, London, Peters joined the Royal Air Force in 1961. He became Officer Commanding No. 10 Squadron in 1977, a staff officer at the Directorate of Forward Policy (RAF) in 1979 and Personal Staff Officer to the Deputy Supreme Allied Commander Europe in 1981. He went on to be Station Commander at RAF St Mawgan in 1984, air attaché in Washington, D.C. in 1987 and Commandant of the RAF Staff College, Bracknell in 1990 before retiring in 1993.

Military offices
Preceded by Sandy Hunter	Commandant of the RAF Staff College, Bracknell; 1990–1993	Succeeded by Michael Donaldson
