= Cathcart Wight-Boycott =

British fighter pilot

- Born: 18 August 1910; Bridgnorth, Shropshire, England
- Died: December 1998 (aged 88); Taunton, Somerset, England
- Military career
- Allegiance: United Kingdom
- Branch: Royal Air Force
- Service years: 1930–1964
- Rank: Air commodore
- Commands: Royal Observer Corps (1961–64); RAF Colerne (1952–53); RAF Molesworth (1945); RAF Church Fenton (1945); No. 25 Squadron RAF (1943–44); No. 29 Squadron RAF (1942–43)
- Conflicts: Second World War
- Awards: Commander of the Order of the British Empire; Distinguished Service Order & Bar

Air Commodore Cathcart Michael Wight-Boycott, CBE, DSO & Bar (18 August 1910 – December 1998) was a British fighter pilot during the Second World War and a senior Royal Air Force officer during the post-war years. In 1961, Wight-Boycott became the 10th Commandant Royal Observer Corps.

== Early life ==
Wight-Boycott attended Marlborough College before going up to Clare College, Cambridge, where he joined the Cambridge University Air Squadron that was based at RAF Duxford and learned to fly in 1930. After leaving university he joined the Metropolitan Police as a non-uniformed civilian administrator. In September 1937 Wight-Boycott joined the Royal Air Force Volunteer Reserve (RAFVR) as a pilot officer in his spare time and undertook advanced combat training on Hawker Hurricanes. He was promoted to flying officer in the RAFVR before enlisting on a short service commission in the Royal Air Force (RAF) at the start of the Second World War in September 1939.

== RAF career ==
Promoted to flight lieutenant, Wight-Boycott's first posting was as a Qualified Flying Instructor at No. 1 Elementary and Reserve Flying Training School, Hatfield where he remained until May 1941. He was sent on a course at No. 54 Operational Training Unit before receiving a combat posting as a fighter pilot with No. 219 Squadron RAF. In July 1941 he was promoted again to acting squadron leader and appointed as flight commander of 'B' flight.

In September 1942, his rank of squadron leader having been made substantive, he was promoted to acting wing commander and posted to RAF West Malling as officer commanding No. 29 Squadron RAF flying Bristol Beaufighters. Between December 1942 and January 1943 he took the additional temporary role of station commander at West Malling.

In February 1943, Wight-Boycott was reverted to squadron leader (war substantive) before he was posted in to No. 81 Group RAF as a headquarters staff officer. In July that year Wight-Boycott returned to operational flying as an acting wing commander and officer commanding No. 9 Group RAF. In September he was appointed officer commanding No. 25 Squadron RAF flying de Havilland Mosquitos.

In September 1944 Wight-Boycott was posted as a headquarters staff officer with No. 12 Group RAF but only a few months later moved to an appointment as station commander of RAF Church Fenton. In early 1945 he moved, again as station commander, to RAF Molesworth, home of the United States Air Force 303rd Bombardment Group, and remained there until September, when he attended a "Methods of Instruction" course at the RAF Senior Staff College.

Following his course, Wight-Boycott became an instructor at the RAF's Officers' Advanced Training School. As the war ended Wight-Boycott was confirmed as a permanent commission officer in the substantive rank of squadron leader. In July 1947 he was promoted to wing commander with seniority and pay backdated to October 1946. In February 1948 he was posted as the air staff officer at Headquarters, RAF Middle East. He returned to the UK in 1950 on the staff at Headquarters Southern Sector, Fighter Command at RAF Colerne.

Promoted to group captain in July 1952, Wight-Boycott took up the appointment of station commander at Colerne, where remained until 1954, when he became a QFI at the RAF Flying College, RAF Manby in Lincolnshire. In April 1955 he was posted to RAF Luqa as senior air staff officer (SASO) at Air Headquarters Malta. On 13 January 1958 he was appointed the RAF's director of Operational Requirements (A), moving sideways as director of Organisation/Logistics (Forecasting and Planning) in September that year.

=== Royal Observer Corps ===
On 1 July 1958 Wight-Boycott received his final promotion to air commodore and was appointed as the tenth commandant of the Royal Observer Corps, taking over from Air Commodore J M Warfield.

In July 1961 Wight-Boycott presented a Royal Observer Corps long-service medal to the Battle of Britain Class locomotive Royal Observer Corps that had started its service with British Railways in December 1948. The ceremony took place at Waterloo station.

== Retired appointment ==
Following his retirement from active service in 1964, Wight-Boycott remained in uniform as a retired 'C' class status senior staff officer in charge of flying training at the headquarters of the Air Cadets. Wight-Boycott's son also served in the RAF and is recorded as being a group captain and serving as regional commandant of Scotland and Northern Ireland ATC.

== Honours and awards ==
- 5 February 1943 – Distinguished Service Order in recognition of gallantry displayed in flying operations against the enemy to Acting Wing Commander Cathcart Michael Wight-Boycott (72005), Royal Air Force Volunteer Reserve, No. 29 Squadron. Since July, 1941, Wing Commander Wight-Boycott has completed much operational flying by night. He was appointed to command his squadron in September 1942. In January, 1943, during an enemy air attack, he displayed outstanding skill and keenness and destroyed 4 enemy aircraft. Wing Commander Wight-Boycott's exceptional personal feat and the fine performance of his squadron was in keeping with his reputation for outstanding enthusiasm and thoroughness.
- 21 November 1944 – Bar to the Distinguished Service Order to Acting Wing Commander Cathcart Michael Wight-Boycott DSO (72005) RAFVR, No. 25 Squadron.

Military offices
Unknown	Station Commander RAF Colerne; 1952–1954	Succeeded by Leslie Fox
Preceded by John Mortimer Warfield	Commandant Royal Observer Corps; 1961–1964	Succeeded by Jeaffreson Greswell
