= Sandy Hunter =

Air Vice-Marshal Sandy Hunter CBE AFC DL
- Born: 8 March 1939 (age 87)
- Military career
- Allegiance: United Kingdom
- Branch: Royal Air Force
- Service years: 1962–93
- Rank: Air Vice-Marshal
- Commands: British Forces Cyprus (1990–93); RAF Staff College, Bracknell (1989–90); RAF Odiham (1981–83); No. 18 Squadron (1978–81)
- Conflicts: Gulf War
- Awards: Commander of the Order of the British Empire; Air Force Cross

Air Vice-Marshal Alexander Freeland Cairns Hunter, CBE, AFC, DL (born 8 March 1939) is a former Royal Air Force officer who served as Commandant of the RAF Staff College, Bracknell.

== RAF career ==
Educated at Aberdeen Grammar School and the University of Aberdeen, Hunter joined the Royal Air Force in 1962. After a tour as assistant air attaché in the British embassy in Moscow, he became Officer Commanding No. 18 Squadron in 1978, Station Commander at RAF Odiham in 1981 and Group Captain Plans at Strike Command in 1983. He went on to be Director of Public Relations for the RAF in 1987, Commandant of the RAF Staff College, Bracknell in 1989 and Commander of British Forces Cyprus and Administrator of the Sovereign Base Areas in 1990 before retiring in 1993.

== Honours and awards ==
- 3 June 1978 – Squadron Leader Alexander Freeland Cairns Hunter (2620410) is awarded the Air Force Cross in the Queen's Birthday Honours.
- 13 June 1981 – Wing Commander Alexander Freeland Cairns Hunter, AFC (2620410) is appointed Officer of the Order of the British Empire (OBE) in the Queen's Birthday Honours.
- 8 October 1982 – Group Captain Alexander Freeland Cairns Hunter, OBE, AFC, is promoted to be a Commander of the Order of the British Empire in recognition of service within the operations in the South Atlantic.
- 2 February 1994 – Appointed an Officer of the Venerable Order of Saint John.

== Works ==
- Hunter, Sandy (2014). The Valley Remembers. Upper Coquetdale Parish Council.

Military offices
Preceded by Derek Bryant	Commandant of the RAF Staff College, Bracknell; 1989–1990	Succeeded by Robert Peters
Preceded by John Friedberger	Commander British Forces Cyprus; 1990–1993	Succeeded by Alexander Harley
