= Gordon Herbert Vasse =

Royal Air Force Air Commodore (1899–1965)

Gordon Vasse
- Born: 23 April 1899; Blean, Kent, England
- Died: 26 March 1965 (aged 65); Southampton, Hampshire, England
- Military career
- Allegiance: United Kingdom
- Branch: Royal Navy (1916–18); Royal Air Force (1918–54)
- Service years: 1916–1951
- Rank: Air Commodore
- Commands: Royal Observer Corps (1951–54); No. 63 Group RAF (1948–51); No. 25 Group RAF (1947–48); No. 21 Group RAF (1946–47); RAF Base Seletar (1946); RAF Duxford (1941); Air Fighting Development Unit RAF (1937–41)
- Conflicts: First World War; Second World War
- Awards: Commander of the Order of the British Empire

Air Commodore Gordon Herbert Vasse, CBE (23 April 1899 – 26 March 1965) was a fighter pilot in the First World War and a senior Royal Air Force commander during the Second World War and into the early 1950s. During most of the Second World War he was Director of Air Tactics for the RAF.

In his final appointment Vasse also served as the seventh Commandant of the Royal Observer Corps. Vasse was chosen as one of the RAF's principal representatives to the funeral of King George VI in 1952.

== RAF career ==
=== Early career ===
In 1917 Vasse joined the Royal Naval Air Service as a trainee pilot in the rank of Probationary Flight Officer and was later promoted to flight sub-lieutenant. When the Royal Air Force (RAF) was formed in March 1918 Vasse transferred to the new service in the rank of second lieutenant and was rapidly promoted to pilot officer and then flying officer. After seeing active combat duty as a fighter pilot in the latter stages of the First World War Vasse was transferred to the unemployed officer list in September 1919.

=== Back to the RAF ===
In October 1921 Vasse rejoined the RAF on a short service commission in the rank of flying officer and posted as a supernumerary pilot at the RAF Central Depot. After a further supernumerary posting to the School of Technical Training he was posted to No. 6 Squadron RAF as a pilot in April 1923. After a short one-month period as a supernumerary at the Central Depot over the Christmas of 1925 he was granted a permanent commission in January 1926 and posted as an instructor to the RAF's Air Armament and Gunnery School. Promoted to flight lieutenant in July 1927, in March 1929 he was appointed Armaments Officer at the RAF North Coates gunnery practice range in Lincolnshire where he remained until November 1930.

Returning to flying duties as a flight commander with No. XV Squadron RAF on 1 November 1930, Vasse remained with the squadron until February 1933, apart from a two-month period while suffering from an illness that prevented him from flying. In November he was posted overseas firstly as Armaments Officer for No. 3 (Indian) Wing RAF and later as Staff Armament Officer at Headquarters No. 1 (Indian) Group.

Returning to the United Kingdom in 1936 he was appointed as a Staff Instructor at the Air Armament School on promotion to squadron leader. After a short armament officer posting to RAF Northolt he was promoted to wing commander and granted his first command as Officer Commanding the Air Fighting Development Unit (AFDU) at RAF Duxford.

=== Commands ===
Vasse would remain at Duxford, becoming station commander there, on promotion to group captain, until July 1941 when he was appointed deputy director of the RAF Air Tactics department. In October the following year he became director of the department in the rank of acting air commodore. In July 1945 he was honoured as a Commander of the Order of the British Empire by King George VI in the King's Birthday Honours.

Between 1944 and 1945 Vasse filled a number of senior appointments in quick succession, including deputy senior air staff officer (SASO) at Headquarters Air Command South East Asia, SASO No. 221 Group RAF and SASO HQ RAF Burma. As the war ended Vasse was serving as AOC RAF Seletar in Singapore.

Returning to postwar England in the autumn of 1946, Vasse served in a number of AOC appointments with No. 21 Group RAF, No. 25 Group and latterly No. 63 Group, where he remained from March 1948 until March 1951. His rank as an air commodore was confirmed on 1 July 1947.

== Royal Observer Corps ==
In March 1951 Vasse was posted to RAF Bentley Priory and took over as the seventh commandant Royal Observer Corps from Air Commodore Sir Richard Bowen Jordan.

Military offices
Preceded by John Hawtrey	Air Officer Commanding No. 21 Group; 1946–1947	Succeeded by Francis Mellersh
Preceded by Christopher Bilney	Air Officer Commanding No. 25 Group; 1947–1948	Vacant Title next held by Richard Jordan
Preceded by Robert Ragg	Air Officer Commanding No. 63 Group; 1948–1951	Succeeded by Walter Merton
Preceded by Richard Jordan	Commandant Royal Observer Corps; 1951–1954	Succeeded by John Simpson
