= Frederick Mackenzie (cricketer) =

English cricketer, magistrate, and militia soldier

Personal information
- Full name: Frederick Finch Mackenzie
- Born: 14 July 1849; Kensington, London
- Died: 17 July 1934 (aged 85); Hove, Sussex
- Batting: Right-handed
- Bowling: Right-arm medium

Domestic team information
- Years: Team
- 1880: Kent
- FC debut: 31 May 1880 Kent v Marylebone Cricket Club (MCC)
- Last FC: 14 June 1880 Kent v Derbyshire
- Source: Cricinfo, 11 March 2017

Colonel Frederick Finch Mackenzie CB (14 July 1849 – 17 July 1934) was an English magistrate, militia soldier and amateur cricketer. He was the commander of 5th Battalion, Lancashire Fusiliers and played two first-class cricket matches for Kent County Cricket Club in 1880.

== Early life ==
Mackenzie was born at Kensington in London, the son of Frederick William Mackenzie and his wife Mary; his father was a doctor working from a practice on Chester Square in Marylebone. He was educated at Wellington College, where he captained the cricket team in 1867, his final year at school, and at Worcester College, Oxford.

== Military career ==
Mackenzie was described as a "gentleman" when he was commissioned as a lieutenant in the 7th battalion, Royal Lancashire Militia in 1871. By 1886 he was serving with the 3rd battalion the Lancashire Fusiliers when he was promoted to the rank of major. He ended his militia career in 1904 when he retired as the commander of the 5th battalion serving as a lieutenant-colonel and was awarded the honorary rank of colonel.

He had served in the Boer War, commanding the 5th battalion on active service from June 1901 to May 1902 in the Orange River Colony and Cape Colony, during which time he was mentioned in dispatches. For his service in the war he was appointed a Companion of the Order of the Bath (CB) in the South Africa honours list published on 26 June 1902, receiving the decoration from King Edward VII during an investiture at Buckingham Palace on 24 October 1902.

== Private life ==
During the 1870s Mackenzie lived at Eythorne House near Dover in Kent. He married Ella Rawson in 1879; the couple had three children. He was a sportsman involved with the Kent foxhounds, and played cricket for Gentlemen of Shropshire, Gentlemen of Dorset, and Band of Brothers, who were closely associated with Kent County Cricket Club. He appeared twice for Kent in first-class cricket matches in 1880, making his debut against Marylebone Cricket Club (MCC) at Lord's and playing later in the year against Derbyshire. In his two first-class matches he scored a total of six runs and did not bowl.

By 1901 Mackenzie and his family were living at Ramslade House in Bracknell. He was a magistrate and Justice of the Peace in Berkshire, was High Sheriff of Berkshire in 1904 and served on the council of the Broadmoor Asylum. He maintained an interest in hunting and "gained a considerable reputation" in the field.

When he died in 1934 Mackenzie was living at Hove in Sussex. He was aged 85.

== Bibliography ==
- Carlaw, Derek (2020). Kent County Cricketers, A to Z: Part One (1806–1914) (PDF). Cardiff: ACS.
