= John Howe (RAF officer) =

Senior Royal Air Force officer

John Frederick George Howe
- Born: 26 March 1930; East London, South Africa
- Died: 27 January 2016 (aged 85)
- Military career
- Allegiance: South Africa; United Kingdom
- Branch: South African Air Force (1949–54); Royal Air Force (1954–85)
- Service years: 1949–85
- Rank: Air Vice Marshal
- Commands: RAF Regiment (1983–85); Southern Maritime Air Region (1980–83); Royal Observer Corps (1977–80); RAF Gutersloh (1973–74); No. 228 Operational Conversion Unit (1968–69); No. 229 Operational Conversion Unit (1967–68); No. 74 Squadron (1960–62)
- Conflicts: Korean War; Suez Crisis; Cold War
- Awards: Companion of the Order of the Bath; Commander of the Order of the British Empire; Air Force Cross; Queen's Commendation for Valuable Service in the Air (2); Distinguished Flying Cross (United States); Air Medal (United States)

Air Vice Marshal John Frederick George Howe, CB, CBE, AFC (26 March 1930 – 27 January 2016) was a senior Royal Air Force officer in the 1970s and 1980s. He flew combat missions in the Korean War and North Sea interceptor air patrols during the Cold War, finishing his career as the Commandant General RAF Regiment and RAF Provost Marshal and Director General Security. Howe also served as the sixteenth Commandant of the Royal Observer Corps between 1977 and 1980.

== Early life and education ==
Howe was born in East London, South Africa, and educated at St Andrew's College, Grahamstown. He joined the South African Air Force immediately after leaving school.

== Flying history ==
=== South African Air Force ===
Howe began his military flying career in the post-Second World War South African Air Force, and learned to fly in Tiger Moths, Harvards and Spitfires. In 1950 he was posted to No 2 Squadron SAAF "The Flying Cheetahs" and deployed to Korea to fly combat missions as part of South Africa's contribution to the Korean War in support of the UN forces.

During his first tour of duty in Korea he flew the Mustang F-51D fighter-bombers in front-line action. A later second tour saw him serving with US infantry units, as a ground-based Forward Air Controller, operating in the thick of the fighting. He was awarded the Distinguished Flying Cross and the Air Medal from the United States for his service during these actions.

=== Royal Air Force ===
When the political situation in South Africa became more difficult and extreme in 1954 he decided to resign from the SAAF and moved to England where he transferred to the Royal Air Force in the rank of flying officer (Service No. 503984) to fly early types of jet fighters. He became a Qualified Flying Instructor (QFI) on Vampires, later converting to the Hawker Hunter, and serving the front line North Sea interceptors of No. 222 Squadron RAF at RAF Leuchars in October 1957 as a flight commander on promotion to flight lieutenant.

During the Suez Crisis in 1956 he had again operated as a Forward Air Controller and landed with the first invasion wave on the beaches with 40 Commando. After Suez Howe returned to flying duties as a Flight Commander with No. 43 Squadron RAF during which time he was awarded with the Queen's Commendation for Valuable Service in the Air. Four years after the Suez debacle Howe was promoted to squadron leader in July 1960 and appointed as Officer Commanding No. 74 Squadron RAF the 'Tiger' Squadron, to introduce the first of the supersonic English Electric Lightning interceptors into service with the RAF. Howe also formed and led "The Tigers" RAF aerobatic display team during his time with No. 74 Squadron.

Howe was selected by the RAF to undertake several overseas demonstration tours where he showcased the remarkable capabilities of the new fighter in numerous air displays and demonstrations. He was awarded the Air Force Cross on 2 June 1962. Promoted to wing commander in January 1966 his developing career took him to a staff posting at Headquarters RAF Fighter Command, a senior instructor posting at Royal Air Force College Cranwell and later as a senior staff officer at the Joint Warfare School.

After a 1965 exchange tour posting to the United States where he flew most of the Century Series Fighters and the Phantom he returned to the UK as Officer Commanding No. 229 Operational Conversion Unit RAF at RAF Chivenor and later No. 228 Operational Conversion Unit RAF at RAF Coningsby where he oversaw the introduction of the Phantom FGR2 into operational service with the RAF. In 1969 on promotion to acting group captain he moved to two staff postings, firstly as 'Staff Officer Central Tactics and Trials' and later as 'Deputy Director Operational Research 1'. After his rank as a group captain was made substantive, in 1973 he was appointed Officer Commanding RAF Gutersloh on the front line of the Cold War Iron Curtain operations.

On his return from Germany in 1975 he attended the Royal College of Defence Studies for ten months and was posted to RAF Bentley Priory as 'Operations Staff Officer (Training)' at Headquarters 11 Group, Strike Command.

=== Royal Observer Corps ===
Following a tour of duty as an Operations Staff Officer, in 1977 Howe moved across the road on promotion to air commodore and took up the appointment as Commandant of the Royal Observer Corps who were also located at Bentley Priory.

Howe applied the same exacting standards and tight discipline to the ROC as he did to his flying. He found an organisation that was superficially sound but with an underlying air of relaxed complacency. His first action was to insist that all wholetime ROC officers, both newly appointed and those already in service, must qualify through the Specialist Entrant and Re-entrant (SERE) Officers Course at RAF College Cranwell. The first intake of five officers to do so attended '157 SERE' in October to November 1979 and Air Commodore Howe was guest of honour at the formal end of course dinner. Also, for the first time in the Corps' history, Howe initiated a two pronged regime of both a Commandant's Command Inspection and Operational Evaluations that would continue until the Corps was stood down. The Command Inspections took place in every group headquarters once every three years, with three months prior notice. Howe himself led a two-man team of HQROC staff officers in a two-day detailed review of administration and organisation by the wholetime and spare time staff.

The operation evaluations were a two-day "No Notice" assessment of the group's operational performance similar to RAF station TACEVALs, from Transition To War right through to prolonged operations under nuclear attack. The OPEVAL evaluation assessors consisted of a joint six-man team from HQROC and the United Kingdom Warning and Monitoring Organisation who would arrive on an irregular basis and place the whole group on a realistic but simulated war footing. By the time Howe's tenure ended in 1980 the dual regime of inspections left the ROC up to date, more efficient and comparable to any unit in RAF Strike Command and he was subsequently considered to have had a greater impact on the operational efficiency of the ROC than any other post-war Commandant ROC.

Howe also spearheaded the rapid improvement of inter-group communications over the coming years with the introduction of computerised message switching and modern integrated, EMP hardened telephone systems.

During his time with the ROC Howe additionally oversaw the Corps' contributions to the Silver Jubilee of Elizabeth II celebrations and events and ensured that every advantage was taken to publicise the unsung work of the Corps. On 30 June 1977 Howe led an ROC contingent that took part in the Royal Review of Reserve and Cadet Forces at Wembley Stadium. On 29 July 1977 he attended when the ROC was represented in the indoor exhibition at the Royal Review of the Royal Air Force at RAF Finningley.

Appointed a Commander of the Order of the British Empire in the 1979 New Year Honours, Howe handed over command of the ROC to Air Commodore R J Offord on 12 April 1981.

=== Later RAF service ===
Following his time in charge of the ROC he was promoted to air vice marshal as AOC Southern Maritime Air Region and his final tour of duty was in the dual roles as Provost Marshal Director General of Security and Commandant-General of the RAF Regiment.

== Retirement ==
In retirement, Howe remained an active member of the No. 74 Squadron RAF's Association.

== Family life ==
Howe had married and had three daughters, he died on 27 January. Howe was famous for his Zulu war dancing as well as tap.

Military offices
Preceded by Michael Horace Miller	Station Commander RAF Gutersloh; 1973–1974	Succeeded by P S Collins
Preceded by Michael Horace Miller	Commandant Royal Observer Corps; 1977–1980	Succeeded by Raymond Offord
Preceded by Henry Reed-Purvis	Commandant-General of the RAF Regiment; 1983–1985	Succeeded by David Leech
