= Michael Donaldson (RAF officer) =

- Born: 22 July 1943 (age 83)
- Military career
- Allegiance: United Kingdom
- Branch: Royal Air Force
- Service years: 1965–96
- Rank: Air vice-marshal
- Commands: RAF Staff College, Bracknell; Royal Observer Corps; RAF Wattisham; No. 23 Squadron; No. 19 Squadron
- Awards: Member of the Order of the British Empire
- Other work: Principal of Yorkshire Coast College (1996–03)

Air Vice Marshal Michael Phillips Donaldson, MBE (born 22 July 1943) is a former Royal Air Force (RAF) officer who became the 22nd Commandant Royal Observer Corps from 1992 to 1993.

== RAF career ==
Educated at Chislehurst and Sidcup Grammar School, Donaldson joined the Royal Air Force in 1965. He became Officer Commanding No. 19 Squadron in 1983, Officer Commanding No. 23 Squadron in 1985 and Deputy Personal Staff Officer to the Chief the Defence Staff in 1986. Promoted to group captain, he went on to be Station Commander at RAF Wattisham in 1987 and following promotion to air commodore on 1 April 1992, he became Senior Air Staff Officer at No. 11 Group. He simultaneously held the appointment of Commandant Royal Observer Corps (ROC) at a time when the majority of the ROC had been stood down, leaving a small number of Nuclear Reporting Cell observers serving at various Armed Forces HQs all over the UK. Promoted to air vice marshal, he served as Commandant of the RAF Staff College, Bracknell from 1993 until leaving the RAF in 1996.

In retirement Donaldson became Principal of Yorkshire Coast College, where he remained until retirement in 2003.

Military offices
Preceded by George Boddy	Commandant Royal Observer Corps; 1992–1993	Succeeded by Cliff Spink
Preceded by Robert Peters	Commandant of the RAF Staff College, Bracknell; 1993–1996	Succeeded by Marten van der Veen
