= Finlay Crerar =

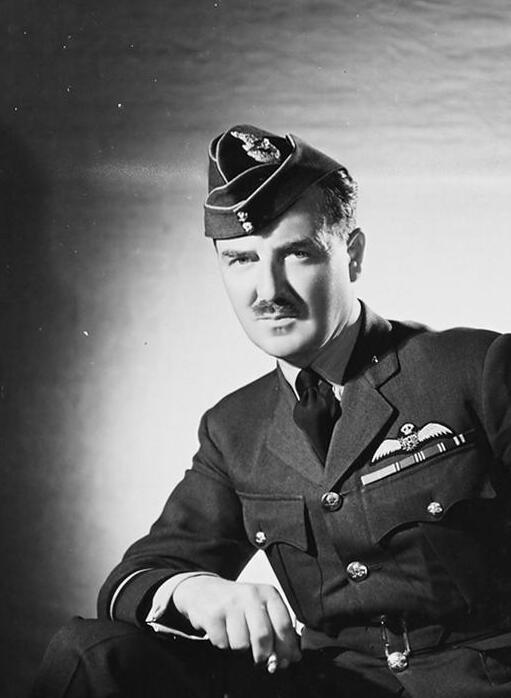
- Born: 23 March 1904
- Died: 12 August 1965 (aged 61)
- Military career
- Allegiance: United Kingdom
- Branch: Royal Air Force
- Service years: 1937–1957
- Rank: Air Commodore
- Commands: Royal Observer Corps (1943–45); RAF Dyce (1939–42); No. 612 Squadron RAF (1937–39)
- Conflicts: Second World War
- Awards: Commander of the Order of the British Empire; Mentioned in Despatches

Air Commodore Finlay Crerar, CBE (23 March 1904 – 12 August 1965) was a senior Royal Air Force officer during the Second World War who served as the fourth Commandant of the Royal Observer Corps (ROC). He led the ROC through the final two years of the war and the difficult period of the V-1 flying bomb raids on southern England.

== Service history ==
=== Royal Air Force ===
On 15 June 1937 Crerar was granted an Auxiliary Air Force commission in the immediate rank of squadron leader and was appointed as the first officer commanding of No. 612 (County of Aberdeen) Squadron Auxiliary Air Force. In November 1939 he was promoted to acting wing commander and appointed as station commander of RAF Dyce. His status was amended to temporary wing commander on 1 September 1940. On 17 February 1942 he was appointed as the operations officer at Headquarters Maintenance Command RAF, where he would later be promoted to group captain.

=== Royal Observer Corps ===
Crerar was promoted to air commodore and appointed commandant of the Royal Observer Corps on 23 June 1943 when his predecessor, Air Commodore Geoffrey Ambler moved across the road at RAF Bentley Priory to RAF Fighter Command as deputy senior air staff officer (DSASO). Crerar immediately generated controversy within the ROC when his first decision was to make retirement at age fifty mandatory for all centre personnel, including the duty officers. No similar changes were to be applied to post personnel, many of whom were already in their 70s and even 80s. The furore rumbled on for the next few years, but the new policy was to remain extant until after the end of the Second World War. Crerar's vision of a younger, fitter and more flexible centre workforce became the norm during hostilities, although many forcibly 'retired' centre personnel immediately re-enlisted on local posts.

During Crerar's command the ROC played a major part in combating the German hit-and-run raids on the south and south-east coasts of Great Britain. He ordered a large number of additional satellite spotter posts to be quickly constructed along the coast giving a more complete low-level coverage. This was vital as radar could not pick up all the low-flying aircraft deliberately under flying the radar beams. For the first time air raid warnings to most coastal towns were sounded directly from the ROC posts to speed up the advance notification of raids.

==== Flying bombs ====
The Defence Committee had been expecting a new phase of enemy air activity which became known as the "flying bomb". Some doubt had been expressed as to the ability of the Corps to deal with this threat, Air Commodore Crerar assured the committee that the ROC could again rise to the occasion and prove its alertness and flexibility. He oversaw plans for handling the new threat, codenamed "Operation Totter".

Observers at the coast post of Dymchurch identified the very first of these weapons and within seconds of their report the defences were in action. This new weapon gave the ROC much additional work both at posts and operations rooms. RAF controllers actually took their radio equipment to the two ROC operations rooms at Horsham and Maidstone and vectored fighters direct from the ROC's plotting tables. The critics who had said that the Corps would be unable to handle the fast-flying jet aircraft were answered when these aircraft on their first operation were actually controlled entirely by using ROC information and Air Commodore Crerar's optimism was vindicated.

==== Handing over command ====
In November 1945 Crerar handed over command of the ROC to Air Commodore Percy Bernard, 5th Earl of Bandon who was to oversee both the temporary stand down of the Corps in the immediate post war period and its reactivation for the Cold War.

=== Later appointments ===
In November 1945 Crerar was appointed as the inspector of the Royal Auxiliary Air Force, and in February 1952 he became aide-de-camp to King George VI just before the King's death. On 10 June 1952 he became aide-de-camp to Queen Elizabeth II, an appointment he held until his retirement from the RAF in 1957.

== During retirement ==
On retirement in March 1957 Crerar accepted the appointments as honorary air commodore with two Auxiliary Air Force squadrons, No. 612 (County of Aberdeen) Sqn RAuxAF and No. 2612 (County of Aberdeen) Field Sqn RAuxAF Regiment. In January 1961 he also became honorary air commodore for No. 3612 (County of Aberdeen) Fighter Control Unit, RAuxAF.

Military offices
Preceded by Geoffrey Ambler	Commandant Royal Observer Corps; 1943–1945	Succeeded by Earl of Bandon
