= Denis Rixson =

Denis Fenn Rixson
- Born: 12 December 1918; Wandsworth, London, England
- Died: 10 December 1994 (aged 73); Chichester, West Sussex, England
- Military career
- Allegiance: United Kingdom
- Branch: Royal Air Force
- Service years: 1937–1971
- Rank: Air Commodore
- Conflicts: World War II
- Awards: Commander of the Royal Victorian Order; Officer of the Order of the British Empire; Distinguished Flying Cross; Air Force Cross; Mentioned in Despatches

Air Commodore Denis Fenn Rixson CVO, OBE, DFC, AFC (12 December 1918 – 10 December 1994) was a British pilot during World War II and a senior Royal Air Force officer in the post-war years and a Commandant Royal Observer Corps.

During World War II, he was the Officer Commanding No. 113 Squadron.

Military offices
Preceded by Jeaffreson Greswell	Commandant Royal Observer Corps; 1968–1971	Succeeded by Edward Sismore
