= Ian Horrocks (RAF officer) =

RAF officer

- Died: 10 June 2014; Cyprus
- Military career
- Allegiance: United Kingdom
- Branch: Royal Air Force
- Service years: 1952–89
- Rank: Air Commodore
- Nickname: "Chunky"
- Commands: Royal Observer Corps (1986–89); RAF Shawbury (1978–80)

Air Commodore Ian Horrocks (died 10 June 2014) was a Royal Air Force helicopter pilot, a senior Royal Air Force officer in the 1970s and 1980s and a Commandant Royal Observer Corps. Horrocks was the Station Commander of RAF Shawbury from 1978 to 1980.

Horrocks retired as an air commodore. He died on 10 June 2014.

Military offices
Preceded by P G C Wilson	Station Commander RAF Shawbury; 1978–1980	Succeeded by R R Bond
Preceded by Jack Broughton	Commandant Royal Observer Corps; 1986–1989	Succeeded by George Boddy
