= Canadian Forces' Decoration =

Canadian award bestowed upon members of the Canadian Armed Forces

- Type: Long service and good conduct medal
- Awarded for: 12 years service with the Regular or Reserve forces
- Presented by: The Monarch of Canada
- Eligibility: Members of the Canadian Forces
- Post-nominals: CD
- Clasps: Bars awarded for every 10 years thereafter
- Status: Currently awarded
- Established: 15 December 1949
- First award: 7 June 1951
- – 12 years – 22 years – 32 years – 42 years – 52 years – 62 years Ribbon bars and rosettes

Precedence
- Next (higher): Royal Canadian Mounted Police Long Service Medal (Canada); Special Constabulary Long Service Medal (UK)
- Next (lower): Police Exemplary Service Medal (Canada); Royal Observer Corps Medal (UK)

The Canadian Forces' Decoration (post-nominal letters "CD") is a Canadian award bestowed upon members of the Canadian Armed Forces who have completed twelve years of military service, with certain conditions. By convention, it is also given to the governor general of Canada upon their appointment, which includes the title of Commander-in-Chief in and over Canada. The decoration is awarded to all ranks, who must have a good record of conduct during the final eight years of claimed service.

The first governor general to receive the CD was Viscount Alexander of Tunis in 1951. The medal was initially awarded to all members of the Royal Family who served in the Canadian Forces, even without completion of twelve years of service; this has, however, not been automatic since 1953.

== Criteria ==
The decoration is awarded to officers and non-commissioned members of the Regular and Reserve forces, including honorary appointments within the Canadian Armed Forces. However, time served while on the Supplementary Reserve List does not apply. The medal may be awarded to persons in possession of any long service, good conduct, or efficiency decoration or medal clasps, provided that the individual has completed the full qualifying periods of service for each award and that no service qualifying towards one award is permitted to count towards any other.

Service in the regular and reserve or auxiliary forces of the Commonwealth of Nations is counted towards the decoration if the final five years have been served with the Canadian Armed Forces and no other long service, good conduct, or efficiency medal has been awarded for the same service.

== Appearance ==
The medal is decagonal (ten-sided, representing the ten provinces), 36 millimetres across the flats, with raised busts. The King George VI medal is .800 fine silver and gilded. Initially, Queen Elizabeth II medals were made of tombac (a copper-zinc alloy); a gilded copper version was introduced in 2008. The King George VI medal has the uncrowned coinage head of King George VI, facing left, with the inscription Georgius VI D: G: Britt: omn: Rex Fid: Def (Note: Latin: Dei gratia Britanniarum omnium Rex Fidei Defensor, lit. 'By the grace of God of all the Britains King, Defender of the Faith') around the edge. The Queen Elizabeth II medal has the uncrowned coinage head of Queen Elizabeth II, facing right, with the inscription around the edge Elizabeth II Dei gratia Regina (Note: lit. 'By the grace of God Queen') with the word Canada at the bottom. The King Charles III medal has the uncrowned head of King Charles III, facing right with the inscription around the edge Charles III Dei gratia Rex (Note: lit. 'By the grace of God King') with the word Canada at the bottom. The reverse of the medal has a naval crown, three maple leaves and an eagle representing the navy, army and air force from top to bottom. The word service is on a scroll at the base and a fleur-de-lis is on each side of the crown. The royal cypher is superimposed on the centre of the King George VI medal, but is omitted from later variants of the medal. The King George VI medal has the name and rank of the recipient engraved on the reverse of the solid bar while the Queen Elizabeth II and King Charles III medals have the name and rank engraved around the edge of the medal. Early Queen Elizabeth II medals have the letters stamped rather than engraved. A clasp, also known as a bar, is awarded for every 10 years of subsequent service. The clasp is tombac and is 1/4 inch (6.4 mm) high, has the Canadian coat of arms in the centre surmounted by a crown, and is gold in colour. This is indicated on the undress ribbon by a rosette.

Recipients of the Canadian Forces' Decoration are entitled to use the post nominal letters "CD". This post-nominal is not affected by the awarding of clasps.

== Notable recipients ==
- Queen Elizabeth the Queen Mother, 5 clasps
- Air Commodore Leonard Birchall, 5 clasps
- Queen Elizabeth II, no clasps worn by choice
- Prince Philip, Duke of Edinburgh, 5 clasps
- King Charles III, 3 clasps
- Queen Camilla
- Major-General James George Ross, 95; enrolled 1879, First World War veteran, honorary colonel of the Royal Canadian Army Pay Corps from 1948 to 1955, invested with the insignia in 1956 as the oldest member of the Canadian Forces to receive the CD
- Ranger Abraham Metatawabin, 92, served with the Canadian Rangers from 1963 to 1971. He re-enrolled in 1995. He was a former chief of Fort Albany.
- Ranger Richard Newell, 5 clasps. He joined the CAF in 1957, retiring from regular force in 1986, when he joined the Canadian Rangers, with whom he was still serving as of 2025. In June 2025 he was awarded his fifth clasp.
- Sergeant Cyril Abbott, 5 clasps. He joined the CAF in 1963, retiring from the regular force in 1986 and joining the Canadian Rangers. He was awarded his 5th clasp in August 2026.

== Notes and references ==
=== General and cited references ===
- McCreery, Christopher (2010). The Canadian Forces' Decoration (PDF). Ottawa: Department of National Defence. ISBN 978-1-100-54293-5. OCLC 779682934.
