= Roy Orrock =

Roy Kenneth Orrock
- Born: 18 January 1921; Romford, Essex, England
- Died: 11 July 2002 (aged 81); Addenbrookes Hospital, Cambridge
- Military career
- Allegiance: United Kingdom
- Branch: Royal Air Force
- Service years: 1940–1976
- Rank: Air Commodore
- Units: No. 22 Squadron RAF; No. 248 Squadron RAF
- Commands: No. 248 Squadron RAF (1945–46); RAF Valley (1963–65); Royal Observer Corps (1973–75)
- Conflicts: Second World War
- Awards: Distinguished Flying Cross

Air Commodore Roy Kenneth Orrock DFC (18 January 1921 – 11 July 2002) was a British pilot during the Second World War and a senior Royal Air Force officer in the post-war years. He served as the fourteenth Commandant Royal Observer Corps from 1973 to 1975. He was Aide-de-camp to Queen Elizabeth II.

During the Second World War, Orrock flew with No. 22 Squadron RAF flying the Bristol Beaufighter moving to the Mediterranean in 1942 after which the unit was posted to North Africa and then the far east and later as commanding officer of No. 248 Squadron RAF flying the de Havilland Mosquito. On 17 March 1945, whilst leading a strike force over Ålesund, Norway, Orrock's aircraft was hit by flak, but he made a successful ditching and became a POW until the end of the war.

Military offices
Preceded by E L McMillan	Commander No. 4 Flying Training School; 1963–1965	Succeeded by R P Harding
Preceded by Edward Sismore	Commandant Royal Observer Corps; 1973–1975	Succeeded by Michael Horace Miller
