= Alan White (RAF officer) =

British RAF officer (1932–2015)

- Born: 11 March 1932
- Died: 8 June 2015 (aged 83)
- Military career
- Allegiance: United Kingdom
- Branch: Royal Air Force
- Service years: 1956–87
- Rank: Air Vice-Marshal
- Commands: RAF Staff College, Bracknell; RAF Leuchars
- Conflicts: Laotian Civil War
- Awards: Companion of the Order of the Bath; Air Force Cross

Air Vice-Marshal George Alan White, CB, AFC (11 March 1932 – 8 June 2015) was a British Royal Air Force officer who served as Commandant of the RAF Staff College, Bracknell.

== RAF career ==
Educated at Wallace High School in Lisburn, Queen's University Belfast and the University of London, White joined the Royal Air Force in 1956. After seeing action at Chiang Mai during the Laotian Civil War in the early 1960s and then serving with Middle East Command in the late 1960s, he then became Officer Commanding No. 5 Squadron in 1970, followed by appointments as Station Commander at RAF Leuchars in 1973, Director of Operations (Air Defence and Overseas) in 1977 and Senior Air Staff Officer at Headquarters No. 11 Group in 1979. He went on to be Air Commodore Plans at Strike Command in 1981, Deputy Commander Royal Air Force Germany in 1982 and Commandant of the RAF Staff College, Bracknell in 1984 before retiring in 1987.

== Death ==
White died on 8 June 2015, aged 83.

Military offices
| Preceded by Anthony Skingsley | Commandant of the RAF Staff College, Bracknell; 1984–1987 | Succeeded by Derek Bryant |
