= RAF Staff College, Bracknell =

Former RAF staff college in Berkshire, England

RAF Staff College, Bracknell
- Ramslade House, Bracknell, Berkshire in England
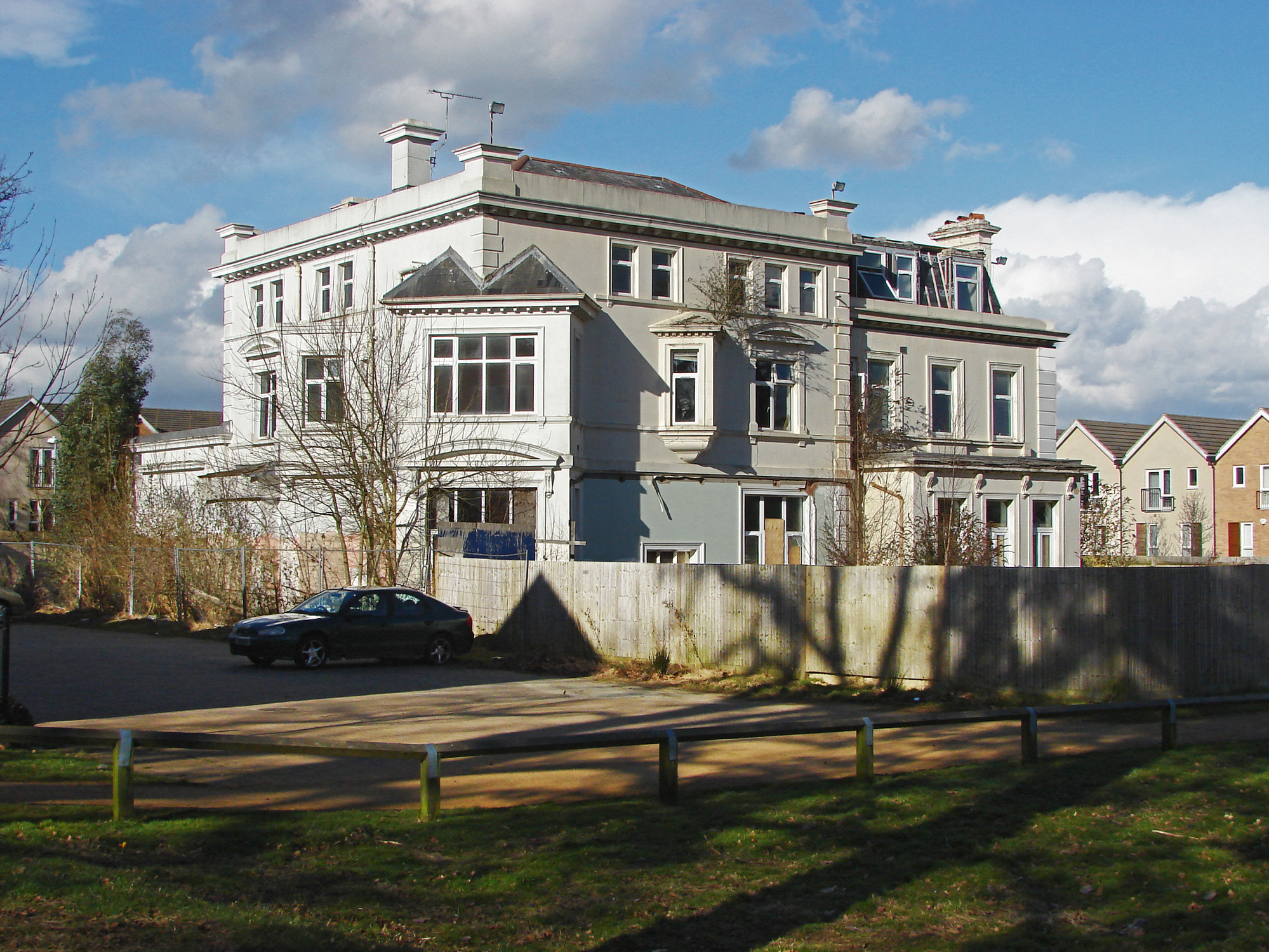
- Ramslade House in 2015 prior to demolition. The building was home to the RAF Staff College, Bracknell.

- Visu et nisu (Latin for 'By vision and effort')

Site information
- Type: Staff college
- Owner: Ministry of Defence
- Operator: Royal Air Force
- Condition: Closed

Location
- Location in Berkshire
- Coordinates: 51°24′32″N 0°44′28″W

Site history
- Built: 1840
- In use: 1945–1997
- Fate: Joint Services Command and Staff College established at the site, which later moved to MOD Shrivenham. The site was subsequently sold for redevelopment in 2004.

The RAF Staff College at Bracknell was a Royal Air Force staff college active for most of the second half of the 20th century. Its role was the training of staff officers in the administrative, staff and policy aspects of air force matters. Its motto was Visu et Nisu which is Latin for by vision and effort. The equivalent in the British Army was the Staff College, Camberley and the equivalent in the Royal Navy was the Royal Naval Staff College, Greenwich.

== History ==
Ramslade House was built as suburban-style villa in 1840 and then substantially re-modelled by Lieutenant Colonel Frederick Mackenzie in 1895. The house became the headquarters for Second Tactical Air Force in 1943 during the Second World War.

The Staff College at Bracknell was formed by transferring a major portion of the Staff College at Bulstrode Park to Ramslade House in July 1945. Air Vice-Marshal Ronald Graham, the then Commandant at Bulstrode Park, became the first commandant at Bracknell.

On 1 May 1946 the Staff College was placed under the control of Reserve Command. Four years later, on 1 August 1950, that command was renamed Home Command. It was subsequently transferred to Training Command on 1 June 1968 and then transferred again to RAF Support Command on 13 June 1973. The final transfer came on 1 April 1994 when the Staff College was transferred to Personnel and Training Command but this arrangement was short-lived as the college closed on 1 January 1997 when RAF staff training responsibilities were transferred to the newly established Joint Services Command and Staff College which was initially located on the same site at Bracknell but later moved to Shrivenham. Defence Estates disposed of the site in 2004, selling it to English Partnerships, a regeneration agency.

== Commandants ==
Commandants include:

- July 1945 Air Vice-Marshal R Graham
- December 1945 Air Vice-Marshal A P M Sanders
- 1947 Air Vice-Marshal T M Williams
- 1 January 1949 Air Vice-Marshal J D I Hardman
- 18 June 1951 Air Vice-Marshal A D Gillmore
- 1953 Air Vice-Marshal D Macfadyen
- April 1956 Air Vice-Marshal D H F Barnett
- 1 August 1956 Air Vice-Marshal R Faville
- 1 January 1957 Air Vice-Marshal S C Elworthy
- 1 December 1959 Air Vice-Marshal M L Heath
- 1 January 1962 Air Vice-Marshal D J P Lee
- 1 January 1965 Air Vice-Marshal T W Piper
- 1 June 1966 Air Vice-Marshal D C Stapleton
- 22 April 1968 Air Vice-Marshal N M Maynard
- 27 September 1970 Air Vice-Marshal M J Beetham
- 2 October 1972 Air Vice-Marshal A McK S Steedman
- 16 August 1975 Air Vice-Marshal K A Williamson
- 23 February 1977 Air Vice-Marshal J B Curtiss
- 27 February 1980 Air Vice-Marshal M Beavis
- 21 April 1981 Air Vice-Marshal D G Parry-Evans
- 29 January 1983 Air Vice-Marshal A G Skingsley
- 29 September 1984 Air Vice-Marshal G A White
- 9 February 1987 Air Vice-Marshal D T Bryant
- 6 January 1989 Air Vice-Marshal A F C Hunter
- 8 August 1990 Air Vice-Marshal R G Peters
- 5 May 1993 Air Vice-Marshal M P Donaldson
- 15 January 1996 Air Vice-Marshal M van Der Veen
