= Jeaffreson Greswell =

British pilot

Jeaffreson Herbert Greswell
- Born: 28 July 1916; Epsom, Surrey, England
- Died: 19 November 2000 (aged 84); Chiltern Hills, Buckinghamshire, England
- Military career
- Allegiance: United Kingdom
- Branch: Royal Air Force
- Service years: 1935–1968
- Rank: Air Commodore
- Commands: Royal Observer Corps (1964–68); RAF Kinloss (1957–59); No. 179 Squadron RAF (1943–44); No. 1471 Flight RAF (1942)
- Conflicts: Second World War
- Awards: Companions of the Order of the Bath; Commander of the Order of the British Empire; Distinguished Service Order; Distinguished Flying Cross; Mentioned in Despatches

Air Commodore Jeaffreson Herbert Greswell, CB, CBE, DSO, DFC (28 July 1916 – 19 November 2000) was a British pilot during the Second World War and a senior Royal Air Force officer in the post-war years. As an air commodore, Greswell served as the eleventh Commandant Royal Observer Corps between June 1964 and June 1968.

== RAF career ==
Greswell joined the Royal Air Force (RAF) in 1935 and served for over thirty years. Much of his war time service was spent with RAF Coastal Command operating on convoy protection duties. Initially flying Ansons with No. 217 Squadron RAF and later in Wellingtons, promoted to squadron leader with No. 172 Squadron RAF. He was heavily involved in the development and testing of the 'Leigh Light' illumination system used effectively in the war against the U-boat menace. On the first serious test of the system in 1942, a Wellington piloted by Greswell, located two U-boats and seriously damaged both with depth charges and machinegun fire.

On his return from a detachment in the United States, where he had overseen American manufacturers on the fitting of the Leigh Light system in Liberators and trained aircrew in its use, Greswell was promoted to wing commander and posted to No. 179 Squadron RAF in Gibraltar.

At the end of the war Greswell was placed on the reserve list of RAF officers. Upon recall in the 1950s he was promoted to group captain and his post war appointments included involvement in the air support planning for the British forces landings in Egypt during the Suez Crisis in 1956.

On promotion to air commodore in June 1964, Greswell was appointed as the 11th Commandant of the Royal Observer Corps during a period which saw the greatest reorganisation and upheaval in the organisation's history.

== Honours and awards ==
- 28 July 1942 – Squadron Leader Jeaffreson Herbert Greswell (37318), No. 172 Squadron, awarded the Distinguished Flying Cross.
- 28 March 1944 – Wing Commander Jeaffreson Herbert Greswell DFC (37318), Royal Air Force, No. 179 Squadron, awarded the Distinguished Service Order.
- 1 January 1946 – Wing Commander Jeaffreson Herbert Greswell DSO DFC (37318), Reserve of Air Force Officers, invested as an Officer of the Order of the British Empire
- 2 June 1962 – Inveasted as a Commander of the Order of the British Empire.
- 10 June 1967 – Invested as a Companion of the Order of the Bath.

Military offices
| Preceded by Cathcart Wight-Boycott | Commandant Royal Observer Corps; 1964–1968 | Succeeded by Denis Rixson |
