= No. 172 Squadron RAF =

Defunct flying squadron of the Royal Air Force

- No 172 Sqn badge
- Active: 1942-1945
- Country: United Kingdom
- Branch: Royal Air Force
- Part of: No. 19 Group RAF, Coastal Command
- Garrison/HQ: RAF Chivenor, UK
- Motto(s): Insidiantibus Insidiamur
- Equipment: Vickers Wellington Mk VIII, Mk XII, MK XIV

No. 172 Squadron RAF was a Second World War Royal Air Force anti-submarine squadron that operated the Vickers Wellington equipped with the Leigh Light.

== History ==
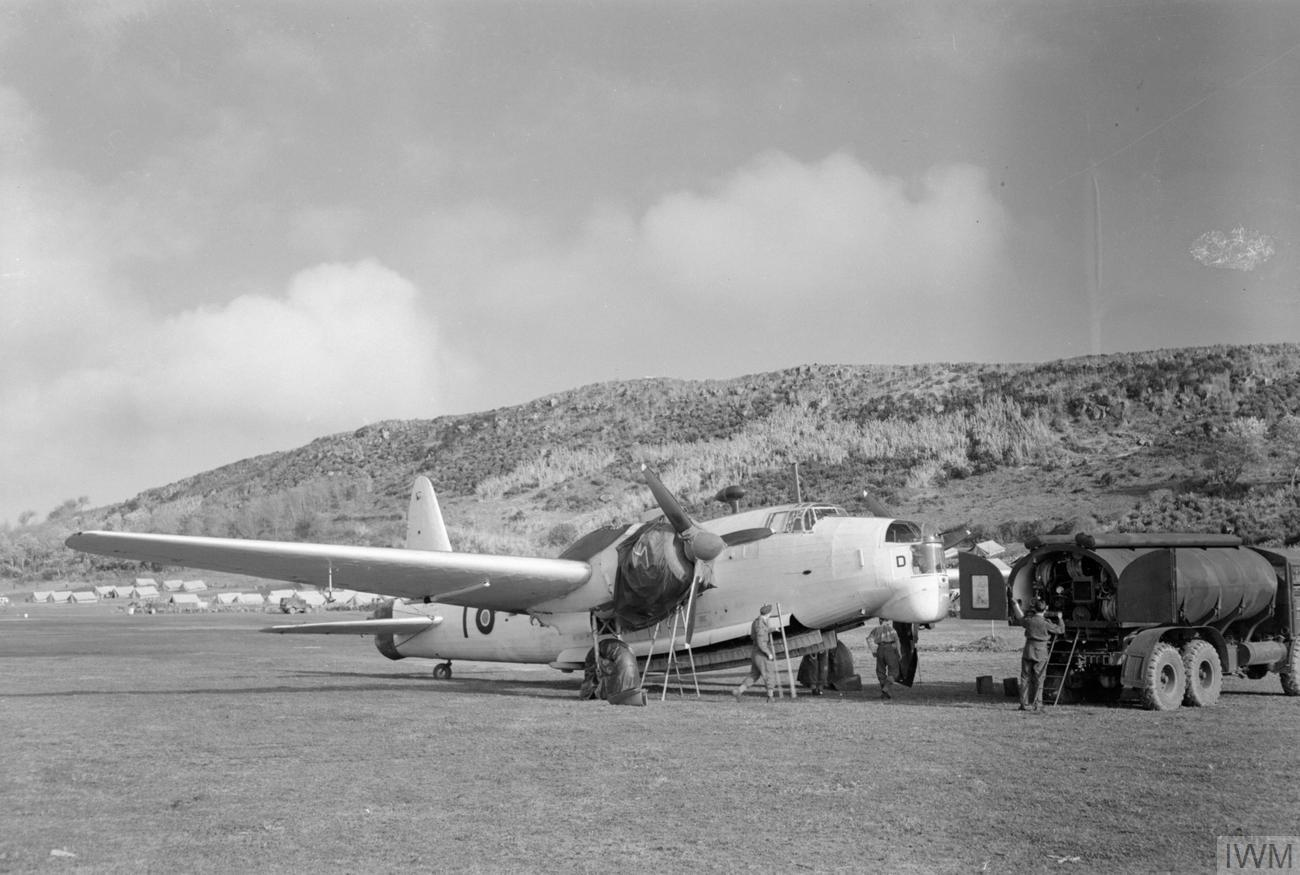
Wellington GR Mark XIV of No. 172 Squadron RAF Detachment at Lajes Field in the Azores circa 1943-1944

The squadron was formed on 4 April 1942 at RAF Chivenor from No. 1417 (Leigh Light) Flight, and was part of 19 Group, Coastal Command. The squadron had been formed to continue the work of the development flight to use the new Leigh Light in conjunction with ASV radar on anti-submarine patrols. The Leight Light was a powerful (22 million candles) searchlight used to illuminate the surface of the sea and any submarines caught on the surface. It operated from bases such as Malta, Gibraltar and the Azores to exploit the new invention and it was also used to attack surface vessels. The squadron re-equipped with the Wellington Mark XIII and the rate of sorties increased, although the aircraft losses also increased as they were hunted by German night-fighters in the Western Approaches.

The Wellington Mk XIII and later XII and XIV have been described as 'the prototype for AWACS' and 172 squadron is renowned for being the first to attack a U-boat at night using the combination of ASV and the Leigh Light.

This first attack came on 4 June 1942. The Italian submarine Luigi Torelli was crossing the Bay of Biscay on its way from La Pallice to the West Indies. At the same time a Wellington Mk VIII of 172 Squadron ('F' for Freddie), piloted by Squadron Leader Jeaffreson Herbert Greswell, was patrolling in the area. At just after 1.27 am the submarine was detected. Greswell made his approach, and turned on the light. It operated exactly as hoped. The Italian submarine was identified and its location confirmed. The submarine commander, unaware of the new weapon, remained on the surface while Greswell made his attack. Four depth charges straddled the submarine, which was badly damaged, although not sunk. The submarine was forced to run for safety in neutral Spain, reaching Santander by 8 June (despite two more attacks by RAF Short Sunderlands).

The first confirmed kill by 172 squadron came a month later, on 5 July, when a Wellington piloted by P/O Wiley B. Howell in 'H' for Harry, one of many Americans who had joined the RAF, sank U-502 in the Bay of Biscay.

As the invasion of France became nearer the squadron concentrated on operations over the western-end of the English Channel. Following the invasion of France the squadron moved to RAF Limavady in Northern Ireland to counter the U-boat threat in the North Atlantic. Following VE-Day the squadron was disbanded at Limavady on 4 June 1945.

== Aircraft operated ==
Dates	Aircraft	Variant	Notes	Reference
1942-1943	Vickers Wellington	VIII	Twin-engined medium bomber	
1942-1943	Vickers Wellington	XII		
1943-1945	Vickers Wellington	XIV		

== Bases used ==
- RAF Chivenor
- RAF Limavady
