= Richard Jordan (RAF officer) =

Royal Air Force Air Marshal (1902-1994)

Sir Richard Bowen Jordan
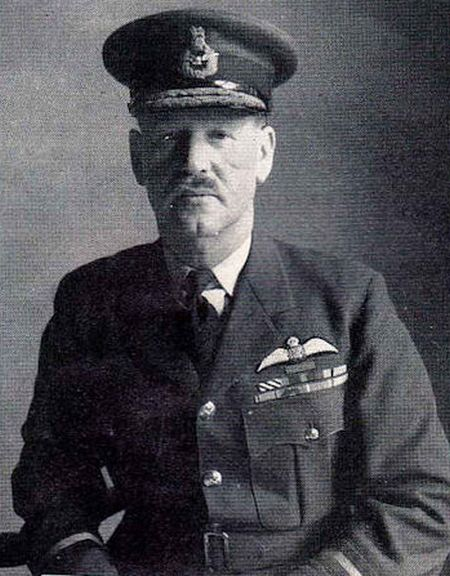
- Air Commodore Richard Bowen Jordan
- Born: 7 February 1902; Pershore, Worcestershire
- Died: 24 April 1994 (aged 92); Tunbridge Wells, Kent
- Military career
- Allegiance: United Kingdom
- Branch: Royal Air Force
- Service years: 1921–58
- Rank: Air Marshal
- Commands: Maintenance Command (1956–58); No. 25 Group (1951–53); Royal Observer Corps (1949–51); RAF Gibraltar (1948–49); RAF India and Pakistan (1947–48); No. 214 Squadron (1940–41); RAF Manston (1940); No. 83 Squadron (1939)
- Conflicts: Second World War
- Awards: Knight Commander of the Order of the Bath; Distinguished Flying Cross; Mentioned in Despatches (4); Commander of the Order of Polonia Restituta (Poland); Commander of the Order of Orange-Nassau (Netherlands)

Air Marshal Sir Richard Bowen Jordan, KCB, DFC (7 February 1902 – 24 April 1994) was a bomber pilot and squadron commander during the Second World War, a senior Royal Air Force officer during the post-war years and the sixth Commandant of the Royal Observer Corps (1949–51).

== Early Royal Air Force career ==
Educated at Marlborough College Sir Richard was one of the first cadets at the new RAF College Cranwell in 1921, at the age of 19, where he learned to fly. He represented the college at both cricket and rugby having been appointed in the rank of flight cadet sergeant. On graduation he was granted a permanent commission in the rank of pilot officer in 1922 and posted as a pilot to No. 2 Squadron. Promoted to flying officer in June 1924 he moved to No. 28 Squadron in February 1926.

On 12 December 1928, Jordan was promoted to flight lieutenant and the following month he transferred to India as a Headquarters Staff officer at No. 2 (Indian Wing) Station, RAF Risalpur. Returning to the UK two years later he was held as a supernumerary officer at the RAF Central Depot before embarking on an eight-year secondment as a test pilot at the Royal Aircraft Establishment's military experimental division at Farnborough. During his time there, he was promoted to squadron leader in 1936.

In January 1938 he temporarily ceased flying duties and took up an appointment as a Staff Officer in the RAF's Directorate of Peace Organisation. Returning to operational flying Jordan was promoted to wing commander and appointed as Officer Commanding No. 83 Squadron in August 1939. Posted to RAF Manston briefly as Station Commander he then became Officer Commanding No. 214 Squadron. On the night of 2 June 1941 Jordan took off from RAF Stradishall in Vickers Wellington No. W5450 for a bombing operation over Berlin. His squadron successfully attacked the target and turned for home. At 06:00, having crossed the English coast, Jordan's aircraft stalled and crashed 7 miles south west of Bury St Edmunds. Although it crashed into a copse of trees, there was no fire and most of the crew were unhurt, returning to the Stradishall on the back of a farm cart. Jordan was awarded with the Distinguished Flying Cross on 22 August 1941.

Over a three-year period he held several transient ranks in quick succession, including temporary group captain, acting air commodore, group captain (War Substantive) and temporary air commodore while serving as the Director of Overseas Transport Operations.

Just after the Second World War finished Jordan was promoted to the substantive rank of air commodore and served as Air Officer Commanding (AOC) RAF India and Pakistan from July 1947 until February 1948 when he was appointed as AOC RAF Gibraltar.

=== Royal Observer Corps ===
On 1 February 1949 Jordan took over the appointment as Commandant Royal Observer Corps at RAF Bentley Priory from Air Commodore the Earl of Bandon. In April 1949 Jordan was additionally appointed Aide de Camp to King George VI. Jordan was Commandant ROC when, on 1 March 1950 the Air Officer Commanding in Chief, RAF Fighter Command assumed direct administrative control of the Corps. Under this change Headquarters Royal Observer Corps continued to operate in its existing form but assumed a status that was comparable with that of a Fighter Command group headquarters.

After lengthy negotiations with Buckingham Palace staff, Jordan formally invited His Majesty King George VI to assume the position of Air Commodore in Chief of the ROC. On 11 April 1950 in recognition of the Corps' record of service during the twenty-five years of its existence, His Majesty King George VI honoured the Corps by accepting the invitation.

=== Later Royal Air Force appointments ===
On 20 March 1951 Jordan handed over the Commandant ROC position to Air Commodore Gordon Vasse. Jordan was promoted to air vice marshal and appointed as AOC No. 25 Group. In 1953 he became Director General of RAF Organisation, an appointment he held until January 1956. That month he was promoted to air marshal and took up his final posting as Air Officer Commanding-in-Chief of Maintenance Command. A Companion of the Order of the Bath since 1947 he was further honoured by being knighted as a Knight Commander of the Order of the Bath in the Queen's Birthday Honours of May 1956. In June 1958 his personal De Havilland Devon crashed near Largs in Scotland while apparently en route to his headquarters at RAF Andover to collect passengers: he was not on board at the time.

Jordan retired from the RAF on 2 June 1958.

== Family ==
In 1932 Richard Bowen Jordan married Freda Monica Minton Haines, daughter of Noel Alexander Minton Haines. They had one child, a daughter. He died on 24 April 1994 at the age of 92.

Military offices
Preceded by Alfred Rogers	Air Officer Commanding RAF Gibraltar; 1948–1949	Succeeded by Geoffrey Spencer
Preceded by The Earl of Bandon	Commandant Royal Observer Corps; 1949–1951	Succeeded by Gordon Vasse
Vacant Title last held by Gordon Vasse	Air Officer Commanding No. 25 Group; 1951–1953	Succeeded by Hugh Brookes
Preceded by Sir Leslie Harvey	Air Officer Commanding-in-Chief Maintenance Command; 1956–1958	Succeeded by Sir Douglas Jackman
