= Jack Broughton (RAF officer) =

British RAF Air commodore (1933/1934-2023)

Jack Broughton OBE, DL
- Born: 1933 or 1934
- Died: 25 June 2023 (aged 89)
- Military career
- Allegiance: United Kingdom
- Branch: Royal Air Force
- Rank: Air Commodore
- Commands: Royal Observer Corps (1984–86); RAF West Drayton (1978–80)
- Awards: Officer of the Order of the British Empire

Air Commodore Jack Broughton, OBE, DL (1933 or 1934 – 25 June 2023) was a senior Royal Air Force officer. A navigator, he obtained senior rank in the 1970s and 1980s and was Commandant Royal Observer Corps from 1984 to 1986. Broughton was the Station Commander of RAF West Drayton from 1978 to 1980. Broughton died on 25 June 2023, at the age of 89.

Military offices
Preceded by W F Page	Station Commander RAF West Drayton; 1978–1980	Succeeded by J D Drysdale
Preceded by George Black	Commandant Royal Observer Corps; 1984–1986	Succeeded by Ian Horrocks
