= Marten van der Veen =

British Royal Air Force officer

- Born: 22 January 1946 (age 80)
- Military career
- Allegiance: United Kingdom
- Branch: Royal Air Force
- Service years: 1963–99
- Rank: Air Vice Marshal
- Commands: RAF Staff College, Bracknell (1996–97); RAF St Athan (1994–95); RAF Cosford (1989–91)

Air Vice Marshal Marten van der Veen (born 22 January 1946) is a former Royal Air Force officer who served as commandant of the RAF Staff College, Bracknell.

== RAF career ==
Educated at King's College School and Magdalen College, Oxford, Van der Veen joined the Royal Air Force in 1963. He became Officer Commanding the Engineering Wing at RAF Brawdy in 1980, Engineering Inspector of Flight Safety at the Ministry of Defence in 1982 and Director of Defence Studies (RAF) in 1985.

He went on to be Station Commander at RAF Cosford in 1989, Director of Support Policy (RAF) in 1991 and Station Commander at RAF St Athan in 1994. After, he became Commandant of the RAF Staff College, Bracknell in 1996 and Director-General of Support Management in 1997 before retiring in 1999.

In retirement, Van der Veen became bursar of Balliol College, Oxford.

Military offices
| Preceded by Michael Donaldson | Commandant of the RAF Staff College, Bracknell; 1996–1997 | Succeeded by Post disbanded |
