= John Simpson (RAF officer) =

Royal Air Force Air Commodore (1907-1967)

- Born: 26 March 1907; Brentford, Essex
- Died: 26 August 1967 (aged 60); Chippenham, Wiltshire
- Military career
- Allegiance: United Kingdom
- Branch: Royal Air Force
- Service years: 1927–1959
- Rank: Air Commodore
- Commands: Royal Observer Corps (1954–59); RAF Cottesmore (1945–46); RAF Marston Moor (1944–1945); No. 1669 Heavy Conversion Unit (Nov–Dec 1944); No. 205 Group (1943–44); No. 60 Squadron (1937–38)
- Conflicts: North West Frontier; Second World War: North African Campaign
- Awards: Distinguished Service Order; Air Force Cross; Mentioned in Despatches (2); Officer of the Legion of Merit (United States)

Air Commodore John Herbert Thomas Simpson, DSO, AFC (26 March 1907 – 26 August 1967) was a bomber pilot during the Second World War and a senior Royal Air Force (RAF) staff officer during the 1950s. In his final appointment before retirement in 1959, Simpson was the eighth Commandant of the Royal Observer Corps.

== Military career ==
=== Royal Air Force ===
Simpson joined the Royal Air Force (RAF) on 30 December 1927 and completed his basic induction training at the RAF Central Depot, RAF Uxbridge and two months later transferred to the No. 2 Flying Training School as a pilot under instruction. In December 1928 he qualified as a pilot in the rank of pilot officer on a short service commission and was posted to the newly reformed No. 101 Squadron RAF at RAF Bircham Newton flying Boulton Paul Sidestrand bombers in a day-bombing role. In June 1929 he was promoted to the rank of flying officer.

In April 1930 Simpson was posted to a directing staff appointment at the RAF training base at RAF Leuchars. In December 1931, he had sat the first exam taken by Short Service Commission holders to undertake specialisation training, successful completion of which would lead to the award of a Permanent Commission. He attended the extended Officer's Engineering Course at the RAF's Home Aircraft Depot RAF Henlow at the same time as Flight Lieutenant Frank Whittle, passing out as a qualified engineer and granted a permanent commission in the rank of flight lieutenant in September 1933. He was posted to the Royal Air Force College Cranwell on the college's engineering staff.

In 1935 Simpson was posted overseas for three years as the Engineering Officer at the RAF Depot, India. On 1 August 1937 he returned to flying duties and was promoted to squadron leader, receiving his first command as Officer Commanding No. 60 Squadron RAF operating in the North West Frontier conflicts with Afghan tribesmen and flying Airco DH.9A and Westland Wapiti aircraft. Only nine months later he was posted as Engineering Officer at No. 3 Flying Training School at RAF Ternhill. In June 1940 he was promoted to temporary wing commander and in November 1941 he was posted as a Staff Officer at HQ No. 205 (Bomber) Group in the North African Campaign. Further promotion came in June 1942 when he became an acting group captain. On 26 April 1942, he was piloting a Vickers Wellington IC (Z1045) of No 70 Squadron, which was shot down as a result of enemy action. He was awarded the Distinguished Service Order.

In July 1943 Simpson was promoted to acting air commodore and appointed as Air Officer Commanding No. 205 (Bomber) Group, a position he retained until the July 1944 when he returned to the UK. Until the end of the Second World War, he commanded the No. 1669 Heavy Conversion Unit at RAF Langar from November until December 1944 when he became commander of RAF Marston Moor. With the cessation of hostilities Simpson reverted to the rank of group captain, where he took up the position of Station Commander at RAF Cottesmore. Between late 1945 and 1951 Simpson served in HQ Staff appointments at Bomber Command and latterly as deputy director of RAF Operations. On 18 Jun 1947, he was flying Spitfire No. SL563 of the Central Bomber Establishment on a practice flight when, on approaching to land, he discovered he could not select the undercarriage down and was forced to carry out an emergency wheels up belly skid landing at RAF Marham, which he managed successfully. For his actions he received the Air Force Cross.

In 1951 Simpson returned to the rank of air commodore and after a brief spell as Senior Officer (Administration) at Headquarters No. 61 Group RAF he became Senior Air Staff Officer (SASO) at Headquarters No. 22 (Training) Group.

=== Royal Observer Corps ===
Approaching his retirement from the RAF, on 29 March 1954 Simpson was appointed Commandant of the Royal Observer Corps, taking over from the retiring Air Commodore Gordon Herbert Vasse. Simpson retired on 1 June 1959 and died on 26 August 1967.

Military offices
Preceded by Oswald Gayford	Air Officer Commanding No. 205 (Bomber) Group RAF; 1943–1944	Succeeded by James Thom Durrant
Preceded by Gordon Herbert Vasse	Commandant Royal Observer Corps; 1954–1959	Succeeded by John Mortimer Warfield
