= Raymond Offord =

Raymond John Offord
- Born: 17 September 1931
- Died: 2011
- Military career
- Allegiance: United Kingdom
- Branch: Royal Air Force
- Service years: 1952–86
- Rank: Air Commodore
- Commands: RAF Air HQ Cyprus (1983–86); Royal Observer Corps (1981–83); RAF Lossiemouth (1974–75); No. 31 Squadron (1969–71); No. 80 Squadron (1968–69)
- Awards: Air Force Cross

Air Commodore Raymond John Offord, AFC (17 September 1931 – 2011) was a senior Royal Air Force officer in the Cold War period, and the seventeenth Commandant Royal Observer Corps. Offord was Station Commander of RAF Lossiemouth from 1974 to 1975 and held the dual appointments of Air Officer Commanding Air Headquarters Cyprus and Deputy Commander, British Forces Near East / Cyprus from 1983 to 1985.

== Service history ==
=== Early RAF career ===
Offord first joined the RAF as an aircraft apprentice on the 57th entry at the No. 1 School of Technical Training at RAF Halton. In February 1952 he transferred as a cadet pilot and was granted a short service commission on 27 February 1952 in a rank of acting pilot officer that was made substantive in June 1953.

In June 1954 he was promoted to flying officer while serving with No. 56 Squadron where he was the ground commentator for the RAF's Firebirds air display team who flew English Electric Lightnings. In June 1957 he transferred to a permanent direct commission. Promotion to flight lieutenant arrived five months later in December 1957. In September 1962 he was posted as a headquarters staff officer with the Special Projects Division of Headquarters Military Air Traffic Organisation, during which period he was promoted to squadron leader.

On 19 July 1968 Offord was promoted to wing commander and he returned to flying duties as Officer Commanding No. 80 Squadron flying English Electric Canberras. In October of the following year he was transferred as Officer Commanding No. 31 Squadron also on Canberra operations. After a short tour as a Staff Officer, with the Air Secretariat Division of the Directorate of Air Personnel, Offord was promoted to acting group captain and appointed as the Station Commander of RAF Lossiemouth.

His rank as a group captain was made substantive in 1975 and he was posted as the Operations Officer with RAF Germany. In December 1977 he was appointed as Assistant Chief of Staff (Offensive Operations) at Headquarters Second Allied Tactical Air Force. He held the dual appointments of Air Officer Commanding Air Headquarters Cyprus and Deputy Commander, British Forces Near East / Cyprus from 1983 to 1985.

=== Royal Observer Corps ===
On 12 April 1980 Offord was promoted to air commodore and assumed the position of Commandant Royal Observer Corps, taking over from Air Commodore John Howe. Offord inherited an organisation that was vastly more efficient and professional after sweeping changes introduced by his predecessor, but one whose communications infrastructure was creaking at the seams with outdated equipment and unprotected telephone links.

Offord pressed for the improvements identified and recommended by a Home Defence Review to be implemented. The Emergency Control Network was woefully outdated and improvements were essential. The national air raid and nuclear fallout warning systems were given priority and the whole system was revitalised and re-equipped. Inter group radio communications were introduced. Offord was stunned by the primitive facilities and the stark environment in the underground monitoring posts and during 1981 he arranged for a HQ working party to re-examine the possible improvements with regard to future heating, lighting, ventilation and feeding provision that would eventually start to filter through over coming years.

On behalf of the whole ROC, Air Commodore Offord presented an engraved Caithness Glass rosebowl to Prince Charles and Lady Diana Spencer to mark their wedding on 29 July 1981.

Offord oversaw the final closing of the last ROC secondary training base at Derby, the only remaining such facility that had survived since the 1953 reorganisation. By the end of Offord's tenure as Commandant the upgrade of the warning system and post communications was all but completed. On 20 February 1983 Offord handed over control of the ROC to Air Commodore George Black.

=== Later RAF duty ===
On leaving the Royal Observer Corps Offord was appointed Air Officer Commanding at the Air Headquarters Cyprus and also took on the dual role of Deputy Commander, British Forces Cyprus. This was Offord's final RAF tour of duty and he retired on 17 September 1986. Ray Offord died in 2011.

Military offices
Preceded by M M J Robinson	Station Commander RAF Lossiemouth; 1974–1975	Succeeded by J R Walker
Preceded by John Howe	Commandant Royal Observer Corps; 1981–1983	Succeeded by George Black
