= Michael Horace Miller =

Michael Horace Milles
- Born: 14 January 1928; Wimborne, Dorset, England
- Died: 8 October 2016 (aged 88); Pershore, Worcestershire, England
- Military career
- Allegiance: United Kingdom
- Branch: Royal Air Force
- Service years: 1949–1981
- Rank: Air Commodore
- Commands: Royal Observer Corps
- Awards: Commander of the Order of the British Empire; Air Force Cross

Air Commodore Michael Horace Miller CBE AFC (14 January 1928 – 8 October 2016) was a senior Royal Air Force officer who was active in the post-war years. He served as Commandant Royal Observer Corps from 1975 to 1977, and was Station Commander of RAF Gutersloh from 1971 to 1973.

He died from anaemia on 8 October 2016 at the age of 88.

== Honours and awards ==
- 1 January 1969 Wing Commander Michael Horace Miller was awarded the Air Force Cross.
- 2 June 1973 Group Captain Michael Horace Miller AFC was appointed a Commander of the Order of the British Empire.

Military offices
Preceded by Keith Williamson	Station Commander RAF Gutersloh; 1971–1973	Succeeded by John F. G. Howe
Preceded by Roy Orrock	Commandant Royal Observer Corps; 1975–1977	Succeeded by John F. G. Howe
