= Edward Sismore =

Edward Barnes Sismore
- Born: 23 June 1921; Kettering, Northamptonshire
- Died: 22 March 2012 (aged 90); Chelmsford, Essex
- Military career
- Allegiance: United Kingdom
- Branch: Royal Air Force
- Service years: c.1939–1976
- Rank: Air Commodore
- Commands: Commandant Royal Observer Corps (1971–73); RAF Bruggen (1964–66); No. 29 Squadron RAF (1953–56)
- Conflicts: Second World War
- Awards: Distinguished Service Order; Distinguished Flying Cross & Two Bars; Air Force Cross; Air Efficiency Award; Order of Dannebrog (Denmark)

Air Commodore Edward Barnes Sismore DSO, DFC & Two Bars, AFC, AE (23 June 1921 – 22 March 2012) was a British air navigator and fighter pilot during the Second World War, and a senior Royal Air Force officer in the post-war years. Sismore served as the thirteenth Commandant Royal Observer Corps between 1971 and 1973.

During his time as Commandant ROC, Sismore travelled overseas to France, Germany and Scandinavian countries, visiting similar defence warning organisations. He established a close relationship with the Luftmeldekorpset Danish Air Reporting Corps, a unit of the country's Home Guard.

== Military career ==
=== Second World War ===
Educated at Kettering County School, on the outbreak of the Second World War Sismore started his service as an airman in the Royal Air Force Volunteer Reserve (RAFVR). However, on 29 August 1942 Flight Sergeant Sismore was given an emergency commission as a General Duties Branch pilot officer in the Royal Air Force Volunteer Reserve. Towards the end of the war, on 1 February 1945, he was awarded a permanent commission as a flying officer.

Sismore trained as a U/T Observer, joining No. 110 Squadron as a navigator when they were operating the Bristol Blenheim, and mainly involved in anti-shipping strikes. He then transferred squadrons, continuing to operate as a navigator on a Blenheim squadron.

==== Reynolds/Sismore ====
Immediately after being commissioned, in December 1942 he joined No. 105 Squadron, navigating a De Havilland Mosquito alongside pilot Squadron Leader Reginald Reynolds. Over the following 20 months, the pair would see little rest and make some of the most daring targeted raids of the war, which came in retrospect to recognise Sismore as the RAF's finest low-level navigator of World War II.

On 30 January 1943, the pair led the first of two Mosquito raids on Berlin timed to disrupt speeches being delivered by Reichsmarschall Hermann Göring and Joseph Goebbels, the Third Reich's Propaganda Minister. The pair led three Mosquito B Mk. IVs from 105 Squadron, which attacked Berlin's main broadcasting station of Reichs-Rundfunk-Gesellschaft on Wilhelmstrasse at 11:00, when Göring was due to address a parade commemorating the 10th anniversary of the Nazis' being voted into power. The mission gave the lie to Göring's claim that such a mission was impossible, and kept Göring off the air for more than an hour. Goering himself was not amused; six weeks later he harangued aircraft manufacturers that he could "go berserk" when faced with the Mosquito, which made him "green and yellow with envy."

For the rest of the spring, the pair mostly led strategic daylight raids against key targets, including power stations, steelworks and factories, and railway assets. Sismore remained Reynolds navigator after he was appointed Commanding Officer of No. 139 Squadron. In this new group, the pair led six Mosquitos on what became the RAF's deepest ever daylight low-level penetration of Germany from Britain, attacking the Schott AG glass works and Carl Zeiss AG optical works at Jena, near Leipzig. Despite heavy damage to their aircraft and with Reynolds wounded, the pair returned to base, with Reynolds awarded a Bar to his earlier Distinguished Service Order (DSO), and Sismore also receiving a DSO.

==== Later war ====
In March 1943, Sismore was appointed a Gee-H instructor at RAF Swanton Morley. Returning to operational duties later that year, Sismore was appointed Navigation Leader of No. 21 Squadron.

In February 1944, Sismore was involved in the planning of Operation Jericho but was prevented from flying with Air Chief Marshal Basil Embry because of their knowledge of the plans. Operation Jericho was a low-level bombing raid on Amiens Prison in German-occupied France. The object of the raid was to free French Resistance and political prisoners who were facing imminent execution. He also participated in the successful raid in late October 1944 against the Gestapo HQ in Århus, Denmark as navigator to Reynolds.

Notably in March 1945, whilst serving on No. 140 Wing, Sismore, by then an acting squadron leader, took part in Operation Carthage, a precision raid on the Gestapo headquarters in Copenhagen, Denmark. Sismore was the lead navigator in the Mosquito Mk.VI flown by the raid leader, Group Captain Robert Bateson. The raid, while not being completely successful with a large number of civilian casualties, succeeded in destroying the Gestapo HQ allowing some prisoners to escape. Sismore was awarded a Bar to his DFC and was also honoured with the Danish Order of Dannebrog, Degree of Knight.

=== Post-war ===
Sismore remained in the RAF after the war, qualifying as a fighter pilot and occupying several senior officer posts. In 1947 Squadron Leader Sismore and former Dambuster pilot, Squadron Leader 'Mick' Martin, broke the London to Cape Town flying record, covering the 6,717 miles in only 21 hours and 31 minutes. They were subsequently awarded the Royal Aero Club's Britannia Trophy for 1947. From 1953 to '56 he commanded No. 29 (Fighter) Squadron. Sismore was promoted to group captain in 1962, and from 1964 to 1966 he served as the Station Commander of RAF Bruggen in Germany. From 1966 to 1970 he was the Senior Air Staff Officer of the RAF's Central Reconnaissance Establishment at RAF Brampton.

=== Royal Observer Corps ===
On 4 January 1971, on promotion to air commodore, Sismore was appointed as Commandant of the Royal Observer Corps taking over from Air Commodore Denis Rixson. Sismore handed command of the ROC to Air Commodore Roy Orrock on 24 May 1973, and was appointed the Director of the Air Defence Team, planning a new UK air defence environment system.

== Retirement ==
Sismore retired from the Royal Air Force on 23 June 1976, and became an advisor to the Marconi Company.

== Honours and awards ==
On 30 January 1943, two forces of bombers were detailed to attack Berlin to prevent a radio broadcast by Goering. To reach the German capital necessitated a flight of more than 500 miles, mostly over heavily defended territory.

- 16 February 1943 – Pilot Officer Edward Barnes Sismore (130208) Royal Air Force Volunteer Reserve of No. 105 Squadron RAF was awarded the Distinguished Flying Cross in recognition as a result of this raid. This was following the attack on the Zeiss works at Jena which was his deepest low level daylight penetration of the war with Wing Commander Reynolds.
- 18 June 1943 – Acting Flight Lieutenant Edward Barnes Sismore of No. 139 Squadron RAF awarded the Distinguished Service Order for the raid on JENA.
- 15 December 1944 – Acting Squadron Leader Edward Barnes Sismore DSO DFC along with his pilot Acting Wing Commander Reynolds was awarded a Bar to the Distinguished Flying Cross.

As pilot and navigator respectively these officers have taken part in numerous sorties against a wide variety of targets. In October, 1944, they took part in a most successful attack on a vital German target. In this well executed operation, these officers displayed skill and resolution of the highest standard.

- 22 June 1945 – 2nd Bar to Distinguished Flying Cross

Acting Squadron Leader Edward Barnes SISMORE, D.S.O., D.F.C., (130208), R.A.F.V.R. In March, 1945, Squadron Leader Sismore was the navigator in the leading aircraft of a large formation detailed to attack the Gestapo headquarters at Copenhagen. The operation, necessitating a flight of more than 1,000 miles demanded the highest standard of navigational ability. In this direction, Squadron Leader Sismore's work was outstanding and contributed materially to the success obtained. Again, in April, 1945, this officer flew with great distinction in an attack against a similar target at Odense. This officer, who completed much operational flying, has rendered very valuable service.

- 18 March 1949 – Squadron Leader Sismore was awarded the Danish Order of Dannebrog, Degree of Knight by Frederik IX, the King of Denmark.
- 31 May 1956 – Squadron Leader Sismore was awarded the Air Force Cross whilst commanding No 29 Fighter Squadron.

== Personal life ==
Sismore married his wife Rita in 1946, and the couple had a son and daughter.

Following a stroke, Sismore died on 22 March 2012 in Chelmsford, Essex, survived by his son and daughter.

Military offices
Preceded by Ivor Broom	Station Commander RAF Bruggen c. 1964 – c. 1966	Succeeded by C D A Browne
Preceded by Denis Rixson	Commandant Royal Observer Corps; 1971–1973	Succeeded by Roy Orrock
Awards
Preceded by Edward Donaldson	Recipient of the Royal Aero Club Britannia Trophy (with H B Martin); 1947	Succeeded by J Cunningham
