= No. 612 Squadron RAuxAF =

Defunct flying squadron of the Royal Air Force

No. 612 (County of Aberdeen) Squadron RAuxAF
- Active: 1 June 1937 – 9 July 1945; 10 May 1946 – 10 March 1957; 1997 – present
- Country: United Kingdom
- Branch: Royal Air Force
- Role: RAF Medical Reserves
- Part of: Royal Auxiliary Air Force
- Base: RAF Leuchars
- Nickname: County of Aberdeen
- Mottos: Latin: Vigilando Custodimus (Translation: "We stand guard by vigilance")

Commanders
- Honorary Air Commodore: Sir Ian Forbes-Leith (48–57); Finlay Crerar (57-present)

Insignia
- Squadron Badge heraldry: In front of a trident and a harpoon in saltire a thistle dipped and leaved The trident and harpoon point to the squadrons anti-submarine role, while the thistle signifies its ties with Aberdeen
- Squadron Codes: DJ (Jul 1939 – Sep 1939); WL (Sep 1939 – Aug 1943); 8W (Jul 1944 – Jul 1945, 1949 – Apr 1951); RAS (May 1946 – 1949)

No. 612 Squadron RAF was originally formed in 1937 as an Army Co-operation unit, and flew during the Second World War in the General Reconnaissance role. After the war the squadron was reformed and flew in the Day Fighter role until disbanded in 1957. At present the squadron has a non-flying role as an RAF Medical Reserves unit.

== History ==
=== Formation and early years ===
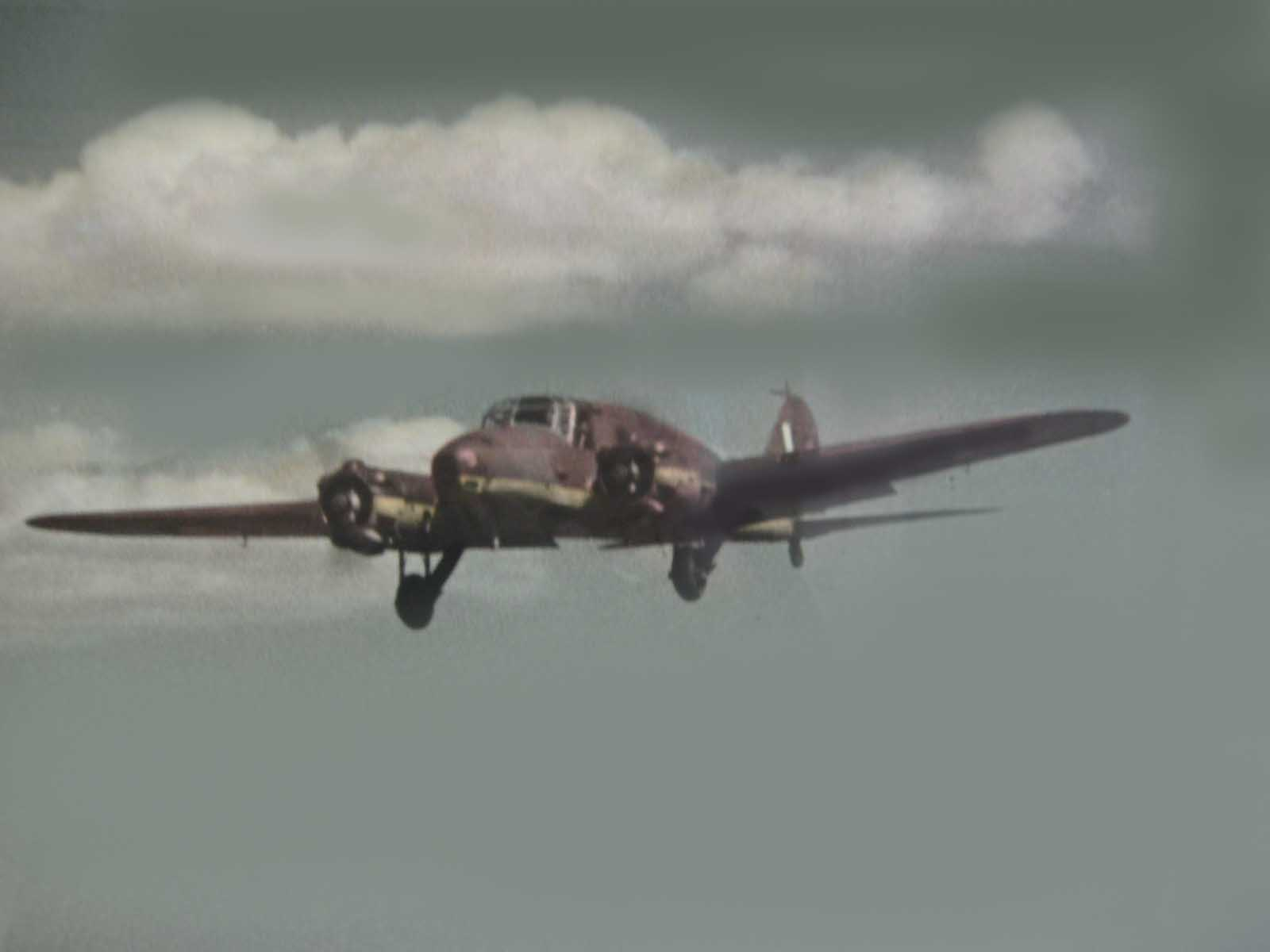
An Avro Anson

No. 612 Squadron RAF was formed on 1 June 1937 at RAF Dyce as an army co-operation unit of the Auxiliary Air Force and was initially equipped with two-seat Avro Tutor training aircraft. In December 1937 it had received two-seat Hawker Hector Army co-operation aircraft, which were retained when the squadron converted from the Army Co-operation to the General Reconnaissance role. In July 1939 the squadron received Avro Ansons which had room for four crew members and had a much better range, making them better suited for the reconnaissance role.

=== Second World War: on Whitleys and Wellingtons ===
No. 612 squadron entered the Second World War as a maritime reconnaissance ("General Reconnaissance") unit within RAF Coastal Command, flying with the Avro Ansons. These were replaced from November 1940 with Armstrong Whitworth Whitleys, and from November 1942 on these made again gradually (April 1943 saw the last Whitley leave the squadron) way for various marks of specially adapted General Reconnaissance (GR) versions of the Vickers Wellington, which the squadron continued to fly until the end of the war. The squadron disbanded on 9 July 1945 at RAF Langham.

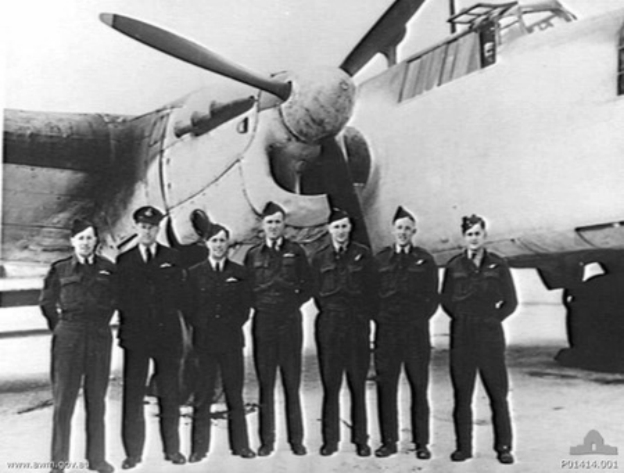
A 612 Sqn crew with a Whitley VII in Iceland, November 1942.

=== Post-war: on Spitfires and Vampires ===
No. 612 squadron was reformed on 10 May 1946 at RAF Dyce as a fighter squadron of the Royal Auxiliary Air Force. Initially the squadron was equipped with Griffon-engined Spitfire F.14s and in November 1948 it got additional Merlin-engined Spitfire LF.16e fighters. It converted to de Havilland Vampire FB.5s in June 1951, flying these first from RAF Leuchars and later from RAF Edzell and, when the runway was extended, again from RAF Dyce until disbandment on 10 March 1957, on the same day as all other flying units of the RAuxAF.

=== Present: field surgical support ===
The squadron was reformed in 1997 at RAF Leuchars from The Air Transportable Surgical Squadron, and maintained that units role of field surgical support. In 2001 the squadron had its first operational role in support of Operation Saif Sareea II, an exercise in Oman. Over a hundred military personnel were treated, mainly for heat-related injuries. In 2003 the squadron was first mobilised for support in a combat zone, in support of Operation TELIC. Squadron members were deployed to Kuwait and Cyprus and finally worked at field hospitals in Basra and Al Ahmara in Iraq. In 2006 No. 612 squadron was again mobilised to support operations in Iraq and was deployed to the field hospital at Shaibah Logistic Base (SLB). Thereafter, the Sqn continued to deploy dedicated medical specialists to augment the Military Hospital and the MERT at Camp Bastion in Afghanistan, earning admiration and commendations for their work. The Sqn continues to train and deploy as required and has now built up an outstanding relationship during 2017–2018 with a USAF Reserve Medical Sqn, which allows for multi-national training.

Commanding Officers since reformation of No 612 (County of Aberdeen) Sqn at RAF Leuchars (now Leuchars Station) in 1997

1997	2001	Wg Cdr J Curnow
2001	2003	Wg Cdr H Grant
2003	2007	Wg Cdr W Pugsley
2007	2011	Wg Cdr A M Moodie OBE QVRM AE
2011	2014	Wg Cdr J P Goodall
2014	2018	Wg Cdr A Cowan
2018	to date	Wg Cdr B M Colligan TD VR

== Aircraft operated ==
Aircraft operated by no. 612 Squadron RAF, data from
From	To	Aircraft	Version
June 1937	December 1937	Avro Tutor	
December 1937	November 1939	Hawker Hector	Mk.I
July 1939	November 1941	Avro Anson	Mk.I
November 1940	December 1941	Armstrong Whitworth Whitley	Mk.V
May 1941	June 1943	Armstrong Whitworth Whitley	GR.Mk.VII
November 1942	February 1943	Vickers Wellington	GR.Mk.VIII
May 1943	June 1943	Vickers Wellington	GR.Mk.XII
June 1943	July 1945	Vickers Wellington	GR.Mk.XIV
November 1946	October 1949	Supermarine Spitfire	F.14
November 1948	July 1951	Supermarine Spitfire	LF.16e
June 1951	March 1957	de Havilland Vampire	FB.5

== Squadron bases ==
data from
From	To	Base	Remark
1 June 1937	1 April 1941	RAF Dyce, Aberdeenshire, Scotland	(Dets. at RAF Bircham Newton, RAF Stornoway, RAF Wick)
1 April 1941	15 December 1941	RAF Wick, Caithness, Scotland	(Dets. at RAF Limavady, RAF St Eval, RAF Reykjavik)
15 December 1941	18 August 1942	RAF Reykjavik, Iceland	(Det. at RAF St Eval)
18 August 1942	23 September 1942	RAF Thorney Island, West Sussex	(Dets. at RAF Wick, RAf St Eval)
23 September 1942	18 April 1943	RAF Wick, Caithness, Scotland	(Dets. at RAF St Eval, RAF Skitten)
18 April 1943	25 May 1943	RAF Davidstow Moor, Cornwall	
25 May 1943	1 November 1943	RAF Chivenor, Devon	(Det. at RAF Davidstow Moor)
1 November 1943	3 December 1943	RAF St Eval, Cornwall	
3 December 1943	26 January 1944	RAF Chivenor, Devon	
26 January 1944	1 March 1944	RAF Limavady, County Londonderry, Northern Ireland	
1 March 1944	9 September 1944	RAF Chivenor, Devon	(Det. at RAF Limavady)
9 September 1944	19 December 1944	RAF Limavady, County Londonderry, Northern Ireland	
19 December 1944	9 July 1945	RAF Langham, Norfolk	
10 May 1946	14 July 1951	RAF Dyce, Aberdeenshire, Scotland	
14 July 1951	14 October 1951	RAF Leuchars, Fife, Scotland	
14 October 1951	12 November 1952	RAF Edzell, Angus, Scotland	
12 November 1952	10 March 1957	RAF Dyce, Aberdeenshire, Scotland	
1997		RAF Leuchars, Fife, Scotland	2014 Now an Army Base - Leuchars Station where No 612 Sqn are still based

== Commanding officers-1937-1957 ==
Data Sources:
From	To	Name
June 1937	June 1940	W/Cdr. F. Crerar
June 1940	July 1941	W/Cdr. J.B.M. Wallis
July 1941	January 1942	W/Cdr. D.R. Shore
January 1942	July 1942	W/Cdr. R.T. Corry
July 1942	April 1943	W/Cdr. R.M. Longmore
April 1943	June 1943	W/Cdr. J.S. Kendrick
June 1943	January 1944	W/Cdr. J.B. Russell
January 1944	February 1945	W/Cdr. D./M. Brass
February 1945	May 1945	W/Cdr. A.M. Taylor
May 1945	July 1945	W/Cdr. G. Henderson
November 1946	August 1948	S/Ldr. R.R. Russell
August 1948	September 1948	S/Ldr. Child
October 1948		S/Ldr. Webb
November 1950	December 1952	S/Ldr. Guy W. Cory
December 1952		S/Ldr. Nigel H.McLean
1955	1957	S/Ldr. T.E. Johnston
February 1957	March 1957	Flt Lt R Robertson
