= Geoffrey Ambler =

Royal Air Force air marshal (1904–1978)

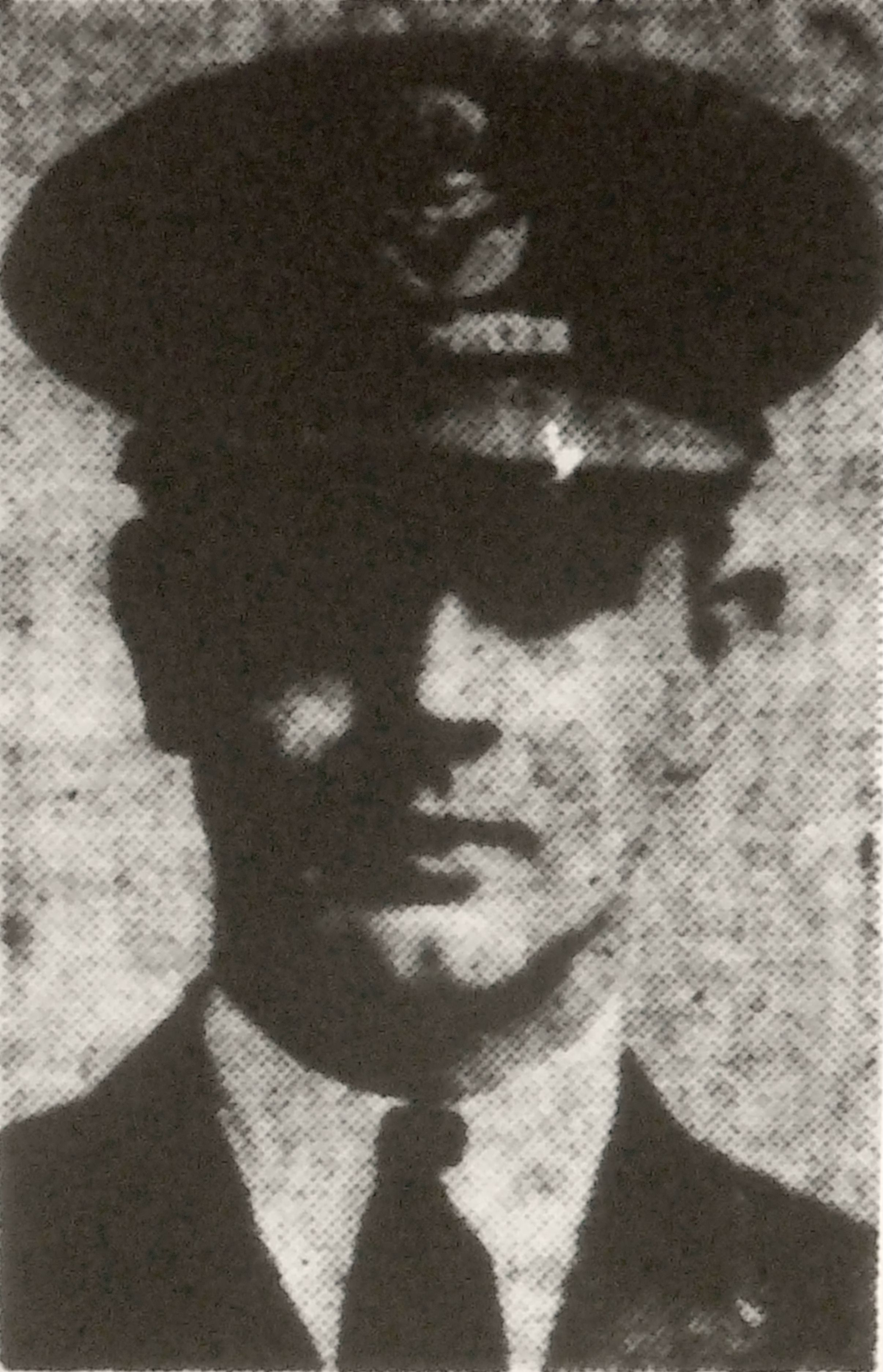
- Geoffrey Hill Ambler, 1944
- Born: 23 June 1904; Baildon
- Died: 26 August 1978 (aged 74)
- Military career
- Allegiance: United Kingdom
- Branch: Royal Air Force
- Service years: 1931–1946
- Rank: Air vice-marshal
- Commands: Royal Observer Corps (1942–43); No. 609 (West Riding) Squadron (1938–39); No. 608 (North Riding) Squadron (1934–38)
- Conflicts: World War II
- Awards: Companion of the Order of the Bath; Commander of the Order of the British Empire; Air Force Cross
- Other work: Chairman of Fred Ambler Limited

Air Vice Marshal Geoffrey Hill Ambler, CB, CBE, AFC (23 June 1904 – 26 August 1978) was a senior officer in the Royal Air Force (RAF) during the Second World War. Ambler served as the third Commandant of the Royal Observer Corps, the first serving RAF officer to hold the appointment as his predecessors were retired air commodores.

== Early days ==
Ambler was born on 23 June 1904 in Baildon, West Riding of Yorkshire, and was educated at Shrewsbury and Clare College, University of Cambridge. He rowed in the University Boat Race for Cambridge in 1924, 1925 and 1926. He was President of the Cambridge University Boat Club from 1925 to 1926. He then worked in the family firm of Fred Ambler Limited in Bradford, Yorkshire and during his time with the company he invented a method which increased the speed at which worsted yarn might be produced.

In 1931 Ambler joined the Auxiliary Air Force and served as a pilot in No. 608 Squadron (North Riding) Squadron in his spare time and in the ranks of pilot officer (7 February 1931), flying officer (7 August 1932) and flight lieutenant (25 November 1933). On 30 December 1934 he was promoted further to squadron leader and appointed Officer Commanding of No. 608 (North Riding) Squadron.

In 1938, still a squadron leader, Ambler transferred to No. 609 (West Riding) Squadron as officer commanding. This auxiliary appointment was short-lived and, following the outbreak of World War II, Ambler was promoted to acting wing commander and took up duties as the Operations Controller at RAF Wick in December 1939. His confirmation in the rank came on 1 January 1940 and he was promoted to group captain a year later in December 1941.

== Royal Observer Corps ==
In June 1942, Ambler was promoted to acting air commodore and appointed as the third Commandant of the Royal Observer Corps, replacing Air Commodore Alfred Warrington-Morris. During his time in command he oversaw the reorganization of the corps' headquarters and the subordinate area headquarters. Ambler also aligned each ROC area's territory to that of its associated Fighter Command group for more cohesive interception of enemy aircraft.

Ambler handed over command to Air Commodore Finlay Crerar in June 1943.

== Return to RAF duties ==
With his rank as an air commodore confirmed Ambler moved across the road at RAF Bentley Priory to an appointment as the Deputy Senior Air Staff Officer (DSASO) of RAF Fighter Command and then the Senior Air Staff Officer (SASO) on 1 February 1945 in the rank of acting air vice marshal.

Between August 1943 and October 1944 Ambler was an Aide de Camp to King George VI.

== Retirement from the RAF ==
Ambler retired from the RAF following the end of the Second World War and returned to work at Fred Ambler Limited. He eventually became chairman of the company.

In October 1947 Ambler was appointed as an Honorary Air Commodore of No. 609 (West Riding) Squadron, an appointment he held until March 1957. He was awarded a similar honour with No. 2609 (West Riding) Field Squadron RAuxAF Regiment between November 1949 and March 1957. In November 1949 he was appointed Honorary Air Commodore with No. 3609 (West Riding) Fighter Control Unit, a position he held until January 1961.

Military offices
Preceded by Alfred Warrington-Morris	Commandant Royal Observer Corps; 1942–1943	Succeeded by Finlay Crerar
