= Tim Piper (RAF officer) =

Royal Air Force Air Marshal (1911-1978)

Sir Tim Piper
- Born: 11 October 1911
- Died: 1 January 1978 (aged 66)
- Military career
- Allegiance: United Kingdom
- Branch: Royal Air Force
- Service years: 1936–1968
- Rank: Air Marshal
- Nickname: "Tim"
- Commands: RAF Staff College, Bracknell (1965–66); No. 38 Group RAF (1962–64); RAF Dishforth (1953–55); RAF Schwechat (1946–47)
- Conflicts: Second World War
- Awards: Knight Commander of the Order of the British Empire; Companion of the Order of the Bath; Air Force Cross; Mentioned in Despatches (3)

Air Marshal Sir Thomas William "Tim" Piper, KBE, CB, AFC (11 October 1911 – 1 January 1978) was a Royal Air Force officer who served as Commandant of the RAF Staff College, Bracknell from 1965 to 1966.

== RAF career ==
Piper was commissioned into the Royal Air Force on 6 July 1936. He served in the Second World War as a flight commander with No. 15 Squadron RAF but was shot down in July 1941 and spent a year as a prisoner of war in Stalag Luft III. After the war he became Officer Commanding, RAF Schwechat in Austria in 1946, wing commander – flying at RAF Gatow in 1948, and a member of staff in Administrative Plans Directorate at Headquarters Middle East Air Force in 1951. He went on to be Station Commander, RAF Dishforth in 1953, group captain – plans at Headquarters RAF Transport Command in 1955, Director of Operational Requirements (Air) at the Air Ministry in 1958, and Chief of Staff to Commander-in-Chief, Headquarters Near East Air Force in 1960. His last appointments were as Air Officer Commanding, No. 38 Group RAF in 1962, Commandant of the RAF Staff College, Bracknell, in 1965 and UK Permanent Military Deputy to the Central Treaty Organization (CENTO) in 1966. before retiring in 1968.

== Sources ==
- Rosier, Frank (2011). Be Bold. Grubb Street. ISBN 978-1906502973.

Military offices
Preceded by David Lee	Commandant of the RAF Staff College, Bracknell; 1965–1966	Succeeded by Deryck Stapleton
