= George Black (RAF officer) =

RAF official

George Phillip Black
- Born: 10 July 1932 (age 94); Aberdeen, Scotland
- Military career
- Allegiance: United Kingdom
- Branch: Royal Air Force
- Service years: 1950–87
- Rank: Air Vice-Marshal
- Commands: Royal Observer Corps (1983–84); RAF Wildenrath (1971–73); No. 5 Squadron (1969–70); No. 111 Squadron (1964–65)
- Awards: Companion of the Order of the Bath; Officer of the Order of the British Empire; Air Force Cross & Bar

Air Vice-Marshal George Phillip Black, CB, OBE, AFC & Bar (born 10 July 1932) is a retired Royal Air Force officer.

== RAF career ==
Black was commissioned into the Royal Air Force in 1950. He became officer commanding No. 111 Squadron in 1964, Leader of the Lightning Display Team in 1965 and Commander of the Lightning Operational Conversion Unit in 1967. He went on to be officer commanding No. 5 Squadron in 1969, a member of the air plans directorate in the Ministry of Defence in 1971 and Station Commander at RAF Wildenrath in 1972. After that he became Commander of the Harrier Field Force at RAF Germany in 1972, Group Captain Operations at Headquarters No. 38 Group in 1974 and Group Captain Operations at Headquarters No. 11 Group in 1978. His last appointments were as Commander Allied Air Defence Sector One in 1980 and Deputy Chief of Staff (Operations) at Headquarters Allied Air Forces Central Europe in 1984 before retiring in 1987.

In February 1983 Black was appointed as the 18th Commandant of the Royal Observer Corps, an appointment he held until September 1984.

== Career after the RAF ==
Between 1987 and 1992 Black was the senior defence advisor at Ferranti Defence Systems in Edinburgh, moving to an appointment as Director of Military Business for Marconi Electronic Business Systems from 1993 until 1999. He then spent a year as the Defence Advisor to the Sensor Division of British Aerospace, transferring to the BAe Systems Avionics division in 2000. Since 2000 Black has been the Defence Consultant for Selex. Black was elected a Fellow of the Institute of Management in 1977 and a Fellow of the Royal Aeronautics Society in 2000.

Military offices
Preceded by D McL Scrimgeour	Station Commander RAF Wildenrath; 1971–1973	Succeeded by J F H Tetley
Preceded by Raymond Offord	Commandant Royal Observer Corps; 1983–1984	Succeeded by Jack Broughton
