= Michael Le Bas =

British air force pilot (1916–1988)

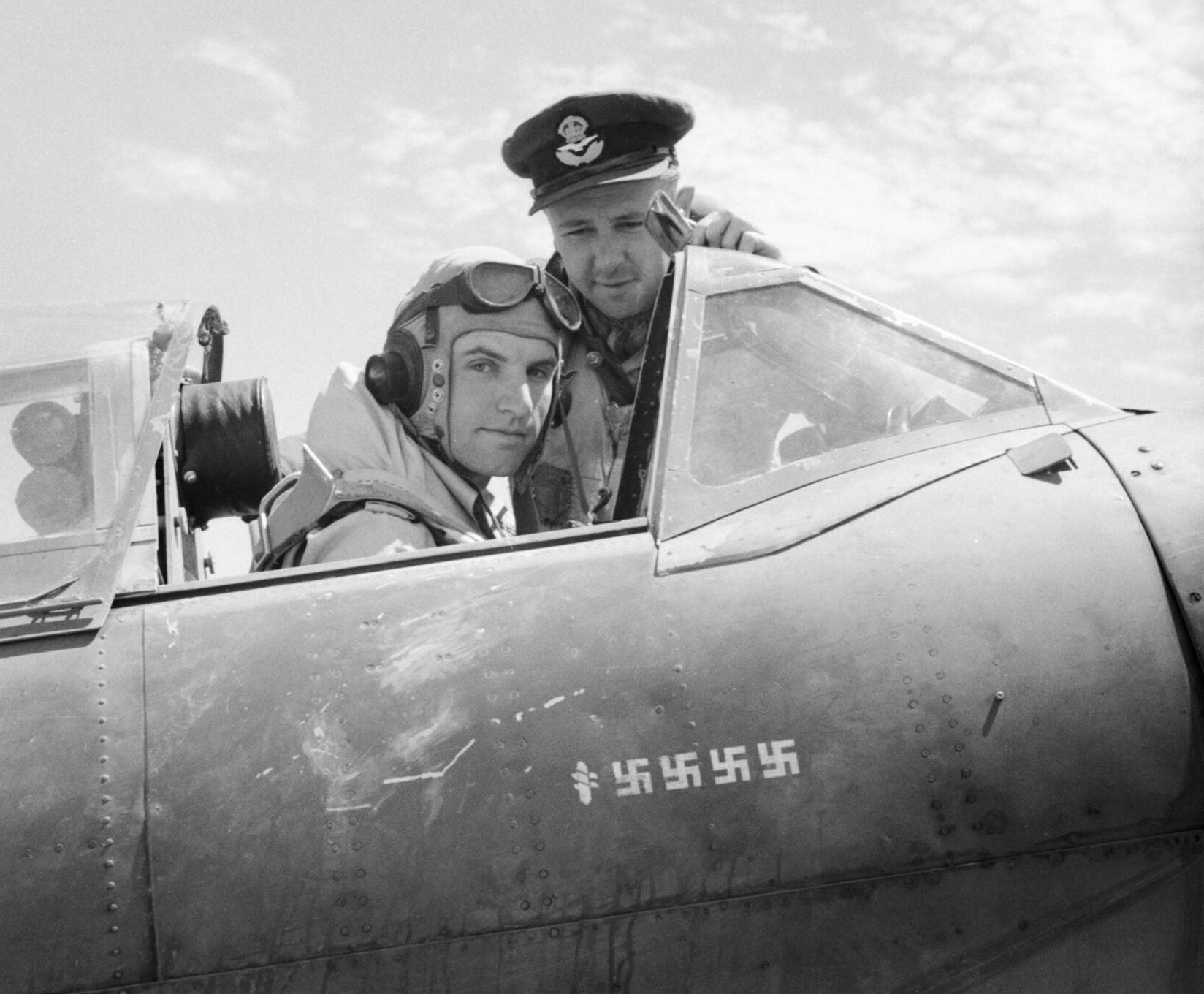
Flight Lieutenant Dennis Barnham of No. 601 Squadron RAF in the cockpit of his Supermarine Spitfire Mk VB at Luqa, Malta, with Pilot Officer M H Le Bas, June 1942

Air Vice Marshal Michael Henry Le Bas, CB, CBE, DSO (awarded on 14 Nov 1944) was nicknamed "Pancho" (2 Sept 1916 – 26 January 1988). Le Bas was a British Royal Air Force (RAF) pilot who flew and fought during the Second World War in England, Malta and North Africa and continued a very successful career post war in the RAF.

== Early life ==
Michael Le Bas was born in Rosario, Estado de Santa Fe, Argentina on the 28 Sept 1916 to Ricardo and "Minga" Florence Le Bas who lived in the small village of Fisherton outside Rosario close to the Pampa. He spent his early years in Rosario, Argentina, where his father worked for a very successful Grain export company run by a British family, the Parrs. His father Ricardo had been educated at Downside School, Somerset before returning to Argentina. Micheal Le Bas first went to study at St. George's College, Quilmes and later travelled from Argentina to England to be educated at Malvern College, Worcestershire (1929–1934). Like many members of the large British community in Argentina (the largest community outside the Commonwealth at this time) he returned to Britain to fight the Axis forces during World War II. His brother Richard was in the King's Hussars and was killed at the battle of El Alamein.

== Second World War ==
Michael Le Bas joined Squadron No 234 Sqn at Ibsley after flying training in September 1941. He was flying in Channel patrols in a Mark II Spitfire. Le Bas was transferred in March 1942 to No 610 Squadron. Richard Le Bas volunteered to transfer to the Middle East in order to see more combat but also probably because his brother to whom he was close was also fighting in that theatre. In April 1942 No 601 Squadron was re-equipping and stowing their Spitfires on the Aircraft Carrier USS Wasp. Come the 20th April they were within flying range and flew off from the carrier to reinforce the defences of Malta. This contingent of Spitfires which included Le Bas was embroiled in very heavy dog fighting stay during June 1942. They encountered heavy fighting from German Squadrons flying from Sicily to Malta under the direction of General Kesselring. Malta was a strategic lynch pin in the supply of armaments, and vital supplies to the Eighth Army in North Africa and was also a very important submarine base. Michael Le Bas's squadron was transferred to the Western Desert where they participated ground attack and reconnaissance missions in integral support of the 8th Army. The 8th army was engaged in the El Alamein. Often known as El Alamein II.

Michael spent some time as a flight instructor in Abu Suweir in Egypt and then he was promoted and made Squadron Leader of No 241 Squadron which flew Spitfire VIII/IX's in Italy. While in Italy his squadron supported 57th Bomber Wing, USAAF with Tactical and Photographic Reconnaissance. They were based at the US air bases since the reconnaissance they gained was utilised in the aid of bombing missions

The citation for Michael Le Bas's Distinguished Service Order (DSO)

"LE BAS, Michael Henry, S/L (104423, Royal Air Force) - No.241 Squadron

(Source - Air Ministry Bulletin 16313)

== Post-World War II ==
Le Bas was awarded a permanent commission by the RAF after the end of the war and had various postings before the Suez Crisis. In 1946 he was on the staff of the Directorate of Organisation (Forecasting & Planning). Following this (1948-Jul 1951 on the Directing Staff at the RAF Staff College, Bracknell. For a spell, close to a year from Jul 1951 to Apr 1952 he was on the Training Air Staff of the 2nd Tactical Air Force (TAF). April 1952 – 1954 saw him as Wing Commander Flying at RAF Wildenrath in North Rhine-Westphalia, Germany and then from 1954 to the staff at the School of Land/ Air Warfare up until the Suez Crisis.

== Suez Crisis and afterwards ==
In 1956 during the Suez Crisis he was Wing Commander, deputy officer commanding, No 215 Wing/RAF at El Gamil, Port Said, Suez, Egypt. Michael Le Bas's commanding Officer was Group Captain Bill Crawford-Compton. After the Suez Crisis he spent 1956-1957 returning to the School of Land/Air Warfare and then moved in 1957 to be the Officer Commanding the Administration Wing of RAF Cottesmore. till early August 1959 when he became a Staff Officer in the Department of the Chief of the Air Staff.

Michael Le Bas was appointed in late August 1959 as the Officer commanding RAF Coningsby. Moreover, from late 1961 to late 1963 he was Group Captain - Operations, Headquarters at Bomber Command. In the subsequent three years he was Senior Air Staff Officer HQ Air Forces Middle East up until June 1966 when he was appointed Air Officer in charge of No 1 Group. Michael Le Bas's was promoted to Air Vice-Marshall in 1969 then he was made Director-General of RAF Personal Services.

== Personal life ==
He was married to his wife Moyra Bentiz, and they had a son Christopher and a daughter Marilyn. Christopher also served in the RAF as a Squadron Commander. Michael Le Bas died on 26 January 1988, in Dinton, United Kingdom.
