= George Boddy =

RAF officer

George Michael Boddy
- Born: 16 September 1937 (age 89)
- Military career
- Allegiance: United Kingdom
- Branch: Royal Air Force
- Service years: 1956–92
- Rank: Air Commodore
- Commands: Royal Observer Corps (1989–92)
- Awards: Officer of the Order of the British Empire

Air Commodore George Michael Boddy, OBE was a senior Royal Air Force officer in the 1980s and the Commandant Royal Observer Corps.

Military offices
Preceded by Ian Horrocks	Commandant Royal Observer Corps; 1989–1992	Succeeded by Michael Donaldson
