= Derek Bryant (RAF officer) =

Royal Air Force air marshal

- Born: 1 November 1933 (age 92)
- Military career
- Allegiance: United Kingdom
- Branch: Royal Air Force
- Service years: 1953–89
- Rank: Air Vice Marshal
- Commands: RAF Staff College, Bracknell; RAF Coningsby
- Awards: Companion of the Order of the Bath; Officer of the Order of the British Empire

Air Vice Marshal Derek Thomas Bryant, CB, OBE (born 1 November 1933) is a former Royal Air Force officer who served as Commandant of the RAF Staff College, Bracknell from 1987 until his retirement in 1989.

== RAF career ==
Educated at Latymer Upper School in Hammersmith, Bryant joined the Royal Air Force in 1953. He became Station Commander at RAF Coningsby in 1976, Senior Air Staff Officer No. 38 Group in 1982 and Deputy Commander Royal Air Force Germany in 1984. He went on to be Commandant of the RAF Staff College, Bracknell in 1987 before retiring in 1989.

Military offices
| Preceded by Alan White | Commandant of the RAF Staff College, Bracknell; 1987–1989 | Succeeded by Sandy Hunter |
