= Commandant Royal Observer Corps =

ROC Badge

The Commandant of the Royal Observer Corps (CROC) was the Royal Air Force commander of the Royal Observer Corps. All the holders of the post were RAF officers in the rank of Air Commodore, initially retired reserve officers then Auxiliary officers and, since the end of World War II, serving officers. The ROC was a uniformed civilian branch initially under the control of the Air Defence of Great Britain organization, then Fighter Command and latterly Strike Command. The Royal Observer Corps existed from 1925 until it was stood down in 1995. Most of the commandants, with only three exceptions, were qualified RAF pilots, two being air navigators and the other a General Duties (Ground) Supply Branch officer. If a Royal Observer Corps officer had ever held the appointment, they would have held the rank of Observer Commodore.

The origins of the ROC go back to Metropolitan Observation Service of World War I which was founded by Air Vice Marshal Edward Ashmore. However, Ashmore never held the post of ROC Commandant. The first two commandants were recently retired RAF Air Commodores, the next two were Auxiliary Air Force officers and the remainder were serving RAF officers. The last three commandants held the appointment in addition to their primary appointment as Senior Air Staff Officer (SASO) at Headquarters No. 11/18 Group RAF, which was colocated with HQROC at RAF Bentley Priory.

The organisation had started as the volunteer civilian Observer Corps in 1925 and became the uniformed Royal Observer Corps in 1941 as part of the RAF in recognition of their invaluable services during the Battle of Britain. Despite several attempts by the Home Office in the 1950s, 1960s and the 1980s to take over the organisation and dispense with the RAF uniform the ROC remained part of RAF Fighter Command and later RAF Strike Command until they were stood down in 1995 as a result of the Communist Bloc breaking up and the Cold War nuclear threat on the UK being removed.

== Commandants in chronological order ==
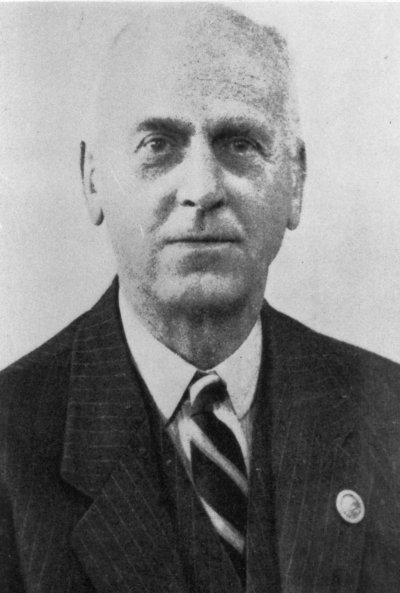
Edward Masterman, first Commandant ROC

Order	Date of appointment	Name of Commandant	Final rank at RAF retirement
1st	1 March 1929	E A D Masterman	Air Commodore
2nd	1 March 1936	A D Warrington-Morris	Air Commodore
3rd	1 June 1942	G H Ambler	Air Vice-Marshal
4th	23 June 1943	F Crerar	Air Commodore
5th	7 October 1945	Percy Bernard, 5th Earl of Bandon	Air Chief Marshal
6th	1 February 1949	R B Jordan	Air Marshal
7th	20 March 1951	G H Vasse	Air Commodore
8th	29 March 1954	J H T Simpson	Air Commodore
9th	29 June 1959	J M Warfield	Air Commodore
10th	29 May 1961	C M Wight-Boycott	Air Commodore
11th	3 June 1964	J H Greswell	Air Commodore
12th	28 June 1968	D F Rixson	Air Commodore
13th	4 January 1971	E B Sismore	Air Commodore
14th	24 May 1973	R K Orrock	Air Commodore
15th	8 November 1975	M H Miller	Air Commodore
16th	23 April 1977	J F G Howe	Air Vice-Marshal
17th	12 April 1981	R J Offord	Air Commodore
18th	19 February 1983	G P Black	Air Vice-Marshal
19th	28 September 1984	J Broughton	Air Commodore
20th	5 December 1986	I Horrocks	Air Commodore
21st	22 December 1989	G M Boddy	Air Commodore
22nd	1 Apr 1992	M P Donaldson	Air Vice Marshal
23rd	1 Feb 1993	C R Spink	Air Marshal
24th and last	16 June 1995	M K Widdowson	Air Commodore
-	31 March 1996	ROC Stood Down	-

== Commandant's insignia ==
Air commodore rank braid

Air commodore's pennant, flown at the masthead of the flagstaff at the unit headquarters

Air commodore's star plate displayed on the commandant's staff car

== See also ==
- Royal Observer Corps
- United Kingdom Warning and Monitoring Organisation
