= John Mortimer Warfield =

British RAF Air Commodore (1912–1970)

- Born: 26 September 1912; Bideford, Devon, England
- Died: 1970 (aged 58); Aldershot, Hampshire, England
- Military career
- Allegiance: United Kingdom
- Branch: Royal Air Force (1930–1961)
- Rank: Air commodore
- Nickname: "Johnnie"
- Commands: Officer Commanding RAF Ta' Qali 1941; OC No. 226 Squadron RAF 1942; OC RAF Waddington 1950; AOC No. 66 Group RAF 1955; Commandant Royal Observer Corps (1959–1961)
- Conflicts: Second World War; Malayan Emergency; Operation Helsby
- Awards: CBE April 1949; OBE January 1946

Air Commodore John Mortimer Warfield (September 26, 1912 - 1970) CBE RAF was a bomber pilot during the Second World War, a senior RAF staff officer and commander during the Malayan Emergency in the 1950s and, as an air commodore in his final tour, the ninth Commandant of the Royal Observer Corps.

== Service history ==
=== RAF service ===
Warfield joined the Royal Air Force on 29 December 1930 on a short service commission and commenced training at the RAF Central Depot, RAF Uxbridge and two months later transferred to the No. 2 Flying Training School as a pilot under instruction. On 29 December 1931 he was posted as a pilot in the rank of pilot officer to No. 13 Squadron RAF.

Promoted to flying officer in August 1932 and flight lieutenant in April 1936, Warfield was appointed as a flight commander with 13 Squadron, before being posted to as a supernumerary officer at the Air Armaments School just three months later. Following his course on 3 July 1937 he was posted as Armament Officer at No. 5 Armament Training Establishment at RAF Penrhos. The following year he was posted overseas to RAF Kalafrana seaplane base on Malta where he was promoted to squadron leader.

In February 1939, just before the Second World War started, Warfield was appointed as Command Armament Staff Officer at HQ Mediterranean Command at RAF Luqa serving under Air Vice Marshal Hugh Lloyd, a post he held until the spring of 1941 when he was promoted to wing commander and appointed as Officer Commanding of the Malta airbase RAF Ta' Qali.

In December 1942 Warfield returned to the UK and was appointed as Officer Commanding No. 226 Squadron RAF flying Douglas Boston III twin-engined bombers from RAF Wattisham in support of the United States Air Force during daylight raids over Germany. In April 1943 Warfield was promoted to temporary rank of group captain and served as the station commander of RAF Wattisham, where he remained until near the end of the war, when he was reverted to the rank of wing commander briefly. When the war finished, he was serving as Senior Officer Administration at Headquarters No. 12 Group RAF.

Immediately after the war, Warfield was involved in the conflict with communist guerrilla forces on the Malayan Peninsula that created the Malayan Union. He was posted as Command Armament Officer at Headquarters Far Eastern Air Command. The following year he was promoted to a substantive group captain and appointed as Senior Air Staff Officer (SASO) at Air Headquarters Malaya, later moving to Advance AHQ Malaya. In 1950 Warfield returned to the UK as Officer Commanding RAF Waddington in Lincolnshire.

In September 1955 Warfield was promoted to acting air commodore as Air Officer Commanding No. 66 (Scottish) Group RAF. In January 1957 the air commodore rank was made substantive and he was appointed as Air Officer Administration at Headquarters British Forces Arabian Peninsula.

=== Royal Observer Corps ===
On 29 June 1959 Warfield took over as Commandant Royal Observer Corps from Air Commodore J. H. T. Simpson. This was Warfield's final service appointment. He retired on 26 June 1961, handing over command to Air Commodore C. M. Wight-Boycott.

== Honours and awards ==
- 28 December 1945 - Officer of the Order of the British Empire.
- 26 April 1949 - Commander of the Order of the British Empire to Acting Group Captain John Mortimer Warfield OBE RAF for distinguished service in Malaya.

Military offices
| Preceded by C S Moore | Air Officer Commanding No. 66 (Scottish) Group; 1955 – 1956 or 57 | Group disbanded |
| Preceded by J H T Simpson | Commandant Royal Observer Corps; 1959 – 1961 | Succeeded by C M Wight-Boycott |
