= George Augustus Vaughn Jr. =

American flying ace

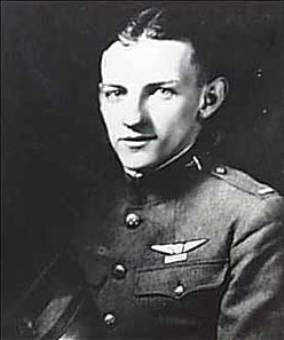
- Lt. George A. Vaughn Jr., 17th Aero Squadron. Distinguished Service Cross.
- Born: May 20, 1897; Brooklyn, New York, U.S.
- Died: July 31, 1989 (aged 92); Staten Island, New York, U.S.
- Burial place: Staten Island, New York
- Military career
- Allegiance: United States of America
- Branch: United States Army Air Service
- Rank: Lieutenant
- Conflicts: World War I
- Awards: Distinguished Service Cross; Distinguished Flying Cross; Silver Star
- Other work: Vaughn College of Aeronautics and Technology

George Augustus Vaughn Jr. (May 20, 1897 – July 31, 1989) was an American fighter ace in World War I and Distinguished Service Cross, Britain's Distinguished Flying Cross, and Silver Star recipient. Vaughn was America's second-ranking Air Service ace to survive the war.

== Early life ==
Vaughn was born in Brooklyn and attended Adelphi Academy. Upon graduating in 1915 he entered Princeton University. While at Princeton Vaughn learned how to fly Curtiss Jenny biplanes.

== World War I ==
After some training with the RAF, and an interim post ferrying aircraft to France, Vaughn was posted in May 1918 to No. 84 Squadron RAF, based in Bertangles and commanded by Sholto Douglas. He was attached to "B" flight, led by Hugh "Dingbat" Saunders, the sometimes-wingman to RAF ace Andrew Beauchamp-Proctor (along with Philadelphia-born Joseph "Child Yank" Boudwin), all three pilots flying the Royal Aircraft Factory S.E.5a. Vaughn claimed seven air victories in his time with 84 Squadron.

In August 1918, Vaughn was transferred to the 17th Aero Squadron, United States Air Service, where he flew the Sopwith Camel, claiming another six victories.

Vaughn was America's second-ranking Air Service ace to survive the war. He is credited with downing four German planes destroyed, seven shared destroyed, one kite balloon destroyed and one aircraft "out of control". One of the German pilots he shot down was Friedrich T. Noltenius, a 21-victory ace, on September 22, 1918.

In November 1919, Vaughn was presented with the Distinguished Flying Cross by the Prince of Wales aboard H.M.S. Renown, anchored in New York harbor.

Vaughn's memoirs were published in a book called: War Flying in France, edited and annotated by Marvin L. Skelton.

=== Verified aerial victories ===
Number	Date	Time	Aircraft	Opponent	Location
1	June 16, 1918	2000	S.E.5.a	Pfalz D.III	Beaucourt
2	July 24, 1918	2035	S.E.5.a	Fokker D.VII	E of Bray
3	July 28, 1918	0940	S.E.5.a	Rumpler C.IV	Harbonnières
4	July 29, 1918	0800	S.E.5.a	Rumpler C.IV	N of Bois de Tailles
5	Aug 22, 1918	1100	S.E.5.a	Rumpler C.IV	SE of Villers-Carbonnel
6	Aug 23, 1918	1015	S.E.5.a	Balloon	Ham
7	August 23, 1918	1120	S.E.5.a	Rumpler C.IV	Maricourt
8	Sep 22, 1918	0845	Sopwith Camel	Fokker D.VII	SE of Fontaine
9	Sep 22, 1918	1245	Sopwith Camel	Fokker D.VII	SW of Cambrai
10	Sep 28, 1918	1745	Sopwith Camel	LVG C.V	51A M34
11	Oct 2, 1918	0910	Sopwith Camel	DFW C.V	E of Awoingt
12	Oct 14, 1918	0710	Sopwith Camel	Halberstadt C.V	E of Bazael
13	Oct 14, 1918	1400	Sopwith Camel	Fokker D.VII	NE of Hausey

=== Notes on Vaughn's victories ===
- #1: Vaughn was about to score his first victory after a bright yellow Pfalz D III took a shot at him. He was shocked and outraged. Breaking formation, Vaughn made a climbing turn to the right pursuing the Pfalz, and closed the range as the enemy pilot headed east into Germany. His adversary dove as the range continued to close. Vaughn opened fire at 100 yards and expended 200 rounds of ammunition from his Vickers gun. The Pfalz began smoking, fell some 500 feet, and burst into flames. Vaughn would later comment: "I remember my first combat victory. The Pfalz I was engaged with got a long burst into my tail before I knew he was even in the sky. That was a great lesson never to be forgotten, always see the other fellow first and never let him see you first. Fortunately his aim was quite poor and after that it was only the routine we had learned in combat school. Eventually he turned for home. I chased him, which wasn't the right thing to do as it turned out. When I finally caught up with him I was quite far into German territory and my flight commander really told me off later, because he didn't relish being pulled that far into Germany just to watch over me. The Pfalz was confirmed by people in the squadron and on the ground. He fell in flames."
- #3: Shared with Lt Roy Manzer
- #4: Shared with Lt Roy Manzer
- #5: Shared with Lt Sidney Highwood
- #7: Shared with Lt Carl Frederick Falkenberg
- #8 & #9: Referenced in Vaughn's Distinguished Service Cross citation (see below). One of planes shot down was flown by Friedrich T. Noltenius, who survived.
- #11: Shared with Lt Howard Burdick "While on O.P., immediately after dropping bombs on Awoingt, saw 2 two-seaters, at 3,500 feet, at 9:10a, just E of Awoingt. Fired at them and they dived east. Lieut Burdick and I followed on D.F.W., with orange fuselage and camoouflaged wings, and shot him down attacking him first from the front. I got in 150 rounds from 75 yards. He went down in a half-dive, half-spin, and crashed into the ground at 57b.B.23."
- #12: Shared with Lt Howard Burdick and Lt L Myers
- #13: Shared with Lt Howard Burdick

== New York Air National Guard ==
Franklin Roosevelt, then Governor of New York, asked him in the early 1920s to help organize the New York Air National Guard, the 102nd Observation Squadron. He commanded that unit as a major for nine years. In 1933, he was promoted to lieutenant colonel and assigned to the 27th Division Staff as Air Officer until he retired in 1939. As an honor in a special program in 1986, then New York Governor Mario Cuomo promoted him to brigadier general in the New York Air National Guard.

== Vaughn College ==
Vaughn and Lee D. Warrender joined with Casey Jones in founding the Casey Jones School of Aeronautics, the predecessor of the Academy of Aeronautics, and as of September 1986, the College of Aeronautics. In September 2004, the name was changed to the Vaughn College of Aeronautics and Technology.

== Death and legacy ==
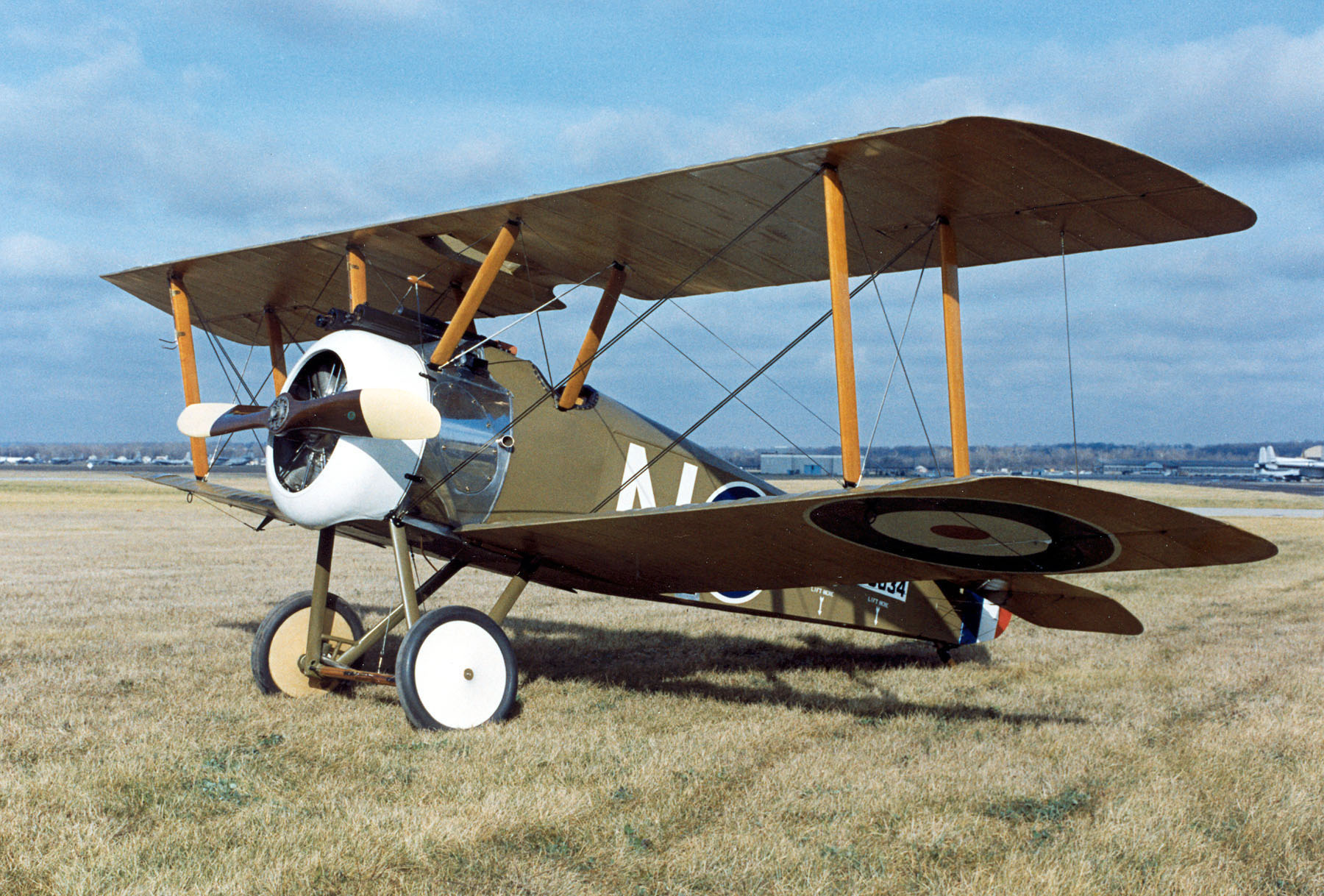
Replica of Vaughn's Camel F.I currently displayed at the National Museum of the United States Air Force

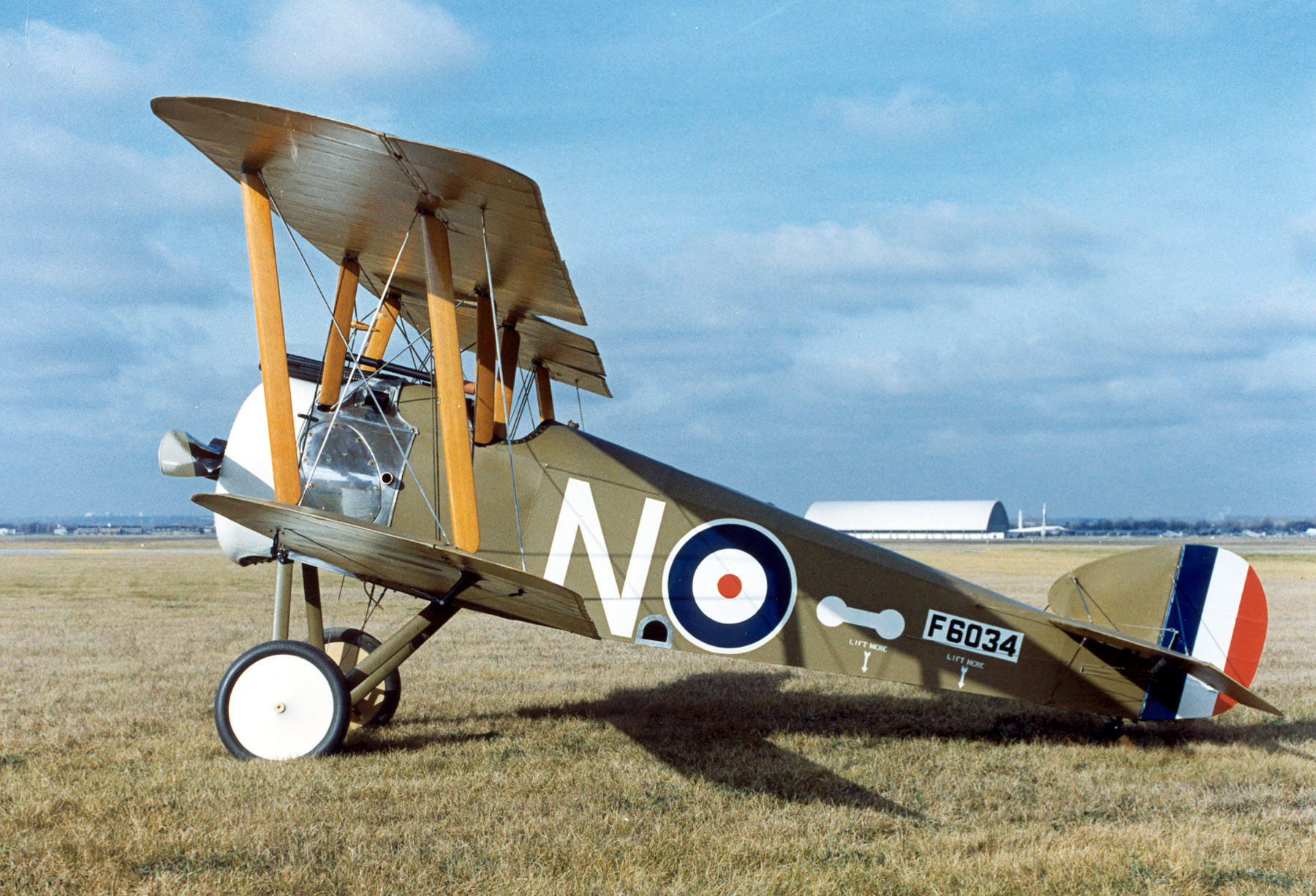
Replica of Vaughn's Camel with 17th Aero Squadron "B" Flight markings

Vaughn died of a brain tumor while on Staten Island, on 31 July 1989. He is buried in Rye, New York. Vaughn's military records, award certificate of military honors and uniform are now in the New York State Military Museum in Saratoga Springs, N.Y.

== Citations ==
=== Distinguished Service Cross ===
"The Distinguished Service Cross is presented to George Augustus Vaughn, First Lieutenant (Air Service), U.S. Army, for extraordinary heroism in action near Cambrai, France, September 22, 1918. Lieutenant Vaughn while leading an offensive flight patrol sighted 18 enemy Fokkers about to attack a group of five allied planes flying at a low level. Although outnumbered nearly 5 to 1, he attacked the enemy group, personally shot down two enemy planes, the remaining three planes of his group shooting down two more. His courage and daring enabled the group of allied planes to escape. Again on September 28, 1918, he alone attacked an enemy advance plane which was supported by seven Fokkers and shot the advance plane down in flames." DSC citation, General Orders No. 60, W.D., 1920

=== Distinguished Flying Cross ===
"For conspicuous bravery in attacking enemy aircraft. On 23 August 1918, while on offensive patrol, he attacked an enemy kite balloon near Ham. Closing to almost point blank range, he fired upon it so that it burst into flames and was destroyed. Shortly afterwards, he observed an enemy two-seater near Maricourt. He attacked it, shooting it down from a height of 500 feet so that it was completely crashed. On 22 August, he drove to its destruction, an enemy two-seater near Villers Carbonnel. In all, he has accounted for six enemy aircraft, five machines destroyed and one driven down completely out of control, and one kite balloon." DFC citation

== See also ==
- List of World War I flying aces
