= Cecil Thompson (RAF officer) =

South African World War I flying ace

Cecil Robert Thompson
- Born: 4 December 1894; Kimberley, Cape Colony
- Died: 16 March 1973 (aged 78)
- Military career
- Allegiance: Union of South Africa
- Branch: Aviation
- Rank: Lieutenant
- Nickname: Ruggles
- Unit: No. 84 Squadron RAF
- Awards: Distinguished Flying Cross

Lieutenant Cecil Robert Thompson was a South African World War I flying ace credited with six aerial victories.

Thompson served two and a half years in the ground forces in both the East and West African campaigns against the Germans. He then transferred into the Royal Flying Corps in August 1917. In April 1918, he joined 84 Squadron on the Western Front as a Royal Aircraft Factory SE.5a pilot. He spent June and July in hospital. Then, on 4 August 1918, he destroyed an Albatros D.V; on the 7th, drove down a Pfalz D.III out of control; on the 11th, destroyed a Fokker D.VII. Then, for his last three victories, he turned balloon buster. On 4 September, he teamed with Sidney Highwood to destroy a German observation balloon. The next day, Thompson destroyed another. On the 15th, he burned another for his final win, despite being tailed by four Fokker D.VIIs; then he was jumped by several more Fokker D.VIIs and wounded seriously in the face and shoulder. He managed to struggle back to base despite his wounds.

== Honors and awards ==
Distinguished Flying Cross (DFC)

Lieut. Cecil Robert Thompson. (FRANCE)

This officer has destroyed three enemy machines and three kite balloons. At all times he displays utter disregard of personal danger, notably so on 15 September, when, in company with another machine, in face of a heavy barrage, he dived to attack a kite balloon; as he dived he was attacked from the rear by four Fokkers. Disregarding them, he continued to dive, and shot down the balloon in flames. He then, although wounded in the face and shoulder, turned and engaged the Fokkers, who had, in the meantime, been reinforced and numbered twelve. Finally, after a stern contest, he made his way back to the aerodrome and rendered his report.

== World War II ==
Thompson rejoined in 1939, transferring to the South African Air Force, later serving with 24 Bomber Squadron.
