= Percy Hobson =

Percy Hobson may refer to:

- Percy Hobson (RAF officer) (1893–1967), British World War I flying ace
- Percy Hobson (high jumper) (born 1942), Australian high jumper
