= Walter Southey =

British World War I flying ace

Walter Alfred Southey
- Born: 29 April 1897; Bermondsey, London, England
- Died: 17 April 1920 (aged 22); Lewisham, London, England
- Burial place: Plot 103J, Brockley and Ladywell Cemeteries
- Military career
- Allegiance: United Kingdom
- Branch: British Army; Royal Air Force
- Service years: c. 1915–1919
- Rank: Captain
- Nickname: Peter
- Units: Royal Fusiliers; No. 48 Squadron RFC; No. 84 Squadron RFC/RAF
- Conflicts: World War I • Western Front
- Awards: Distinguished Flying Cross & Bar

Captain Walter Alfred Southey DFC* (29 April 1897 – 17 April 1920) was a British First World War flying ace, credited with twenty aerial victories, including five balloons, making him the second highest scoring ace in No. 84 Squadron, behind Andrew Beauchamp-Proctor.

== Early life ==
Born in Bermondsey, he was familiarly known as Peter Southey. His family later lived in Brockley and New Cross. His father, Walter, was a warehouseman in the lace trade; his mother's name was Emma Susan (née Stacey). Walter may have been a pupil at Christ's Hospital – the Bluecoat school.

== Military service ==
Southey enlisted as a private in the 19th (Service) Battalion (2nd Public Schools), Royal Fusiliers (City of London) Regiment, with regimental number 6741. On 26 June 1915 the 19th Battalion became part of the 98th Brigade in the 33rd Division, and Southey was with them when they were sent to France in November 1915. 19th Battalion were disbanded on 24 April 1916, and Southey then joined the Royal Flying Corps. He was commissioned as a temporary second lieutenant (on probation) on 5 August 1916, and after completing his flight training was appointed a flying officer and confirmed in his rank on 12 February 1917. Southey flew the Bristol F.2 two-seater fighter with No. 48 Squadron through early 1917, making no victory claims, and was wounded when shot down on 4 June.

He was promoted to lieutenant on 5 February 1918, before returning to action in March when he joined No. 84 Squadron to fly the S.E.5a single-seat fighter. He was credited with twenty aerial victories between May and October 1918, and was appointed a flight commander with the acting-rank of captain on 14 July 1918.

Southey was awarded his first Distinguished Flying Cross on 2 November 1918. His citation read:

Lieutenant (Temporary Captain) Walter Alfred Southey.

"A gallant and skilful officer. On the 9th August, observing a large body of enemy troops and artillery on a road, he descended to 50 feet and bombed them, causing heavy casualties; he then engaged them with machine-gun fire, inflicting further loss and scattering them in all directions. He displays great courage in the air, having accounted for seven enemy aircraft."

Southey's Bar to his Distinguished Flying Cross was gazetted on 7 February 1919. His citation read:

Lieutenant (Acting Captain) Walter Alfred Southey, DFC.

"An officer of ready resource whose skilful leadership is of the greatest value to his squadron. Since 23rd August Captain Southey has destroyed five enemy kite balloons and three machines, while he has also driven down two aircraft completely out of control."

After the end of the war Southey was discharged from RAF service, being transferred to the RAF's unemployed list on 9 March 1919. His tally of 20 victories was made up of five observation balloons destroyed, eight aircraft destroyed (two shared), and seven driven down out of control (one shared).

=== List of aerial victories ===
Combat record
No.	Date Time	Aircraft (Serial No.)	Opponent	Result	Location	Notes
1	2 May 1918 @ 1450	S.E.5a (D5399)	Albatros D.V	Out of control	East of Abancourt	
2	16 May 1918 @ 1620	S.E.5a (D5399)	Fokker Dr.I	Destroyed	North-north-west of Abancourt	
3	5 June 1918 @ 1235	S.E.5a (D5399)	Rumpler C	Destroyed	200 yds west of Moreuil	Shared with Captain Andrew Beauchamp-Proctor.
4	18 June 1918 @ 1055	S.E.5a (B8399)	Fokker D.VII	Out of control	Abancourt	
5	1 August 1918 @ 1005	S.E.5a (C1834)	Fokker D.VII	Destroyed	Suzanne aerodrome	
6	7 August 1918 @ 0955	S.E.5a (C1834)	Rumpler C	Destroyed	East of Arvillers	
7	10 August 1918 @ 1800	S.E.5a (C1834)	Fokker D.VII	Out of control	Péronne–Brie	
8	17 August 1918 @ 0900	S.E.5a (C1834)	Fokker D.VII	Out of control	Estrées	
9	25 August 1918 @ 0945	S.E.5a (C1834)	LVG C	Out of control	North of Foucaucourt	Shared with Second Lieutenant Cecil Wilson.
10	29 August 1918 @ 1445	S.E.5a (C1834)	Fokker D.VII	Out of control	West of Athies	
11	3 September 1918 @ 0615	S.E.5a (C1834)	C	Destroyed in flames	South of Manancourt–Nurlu Road	Shared with Lieutenants A. E. Hill and E. R. W. Miller, & Second Lieutenants Cecil Wilson and Francis Ricardo Cristiani.
12	3 September 1918 @ 0645	S.E.5a (C1834)	Balloon	Destroyed	Fins	
13	3 September 1918 @ 1530	S.E.5a (C1834)	Balloon	Destroyed	North of Fins	
14	14 September 1918 @ 1030	S.E.5a (E6008)	Balloon	Destroyed	Gonnelieu	
15	14 October 1918 @ 0700-0900	S.E.5a (E4071)	Balloon	Destroyed	East of Mont-d'Origny	
16	22 October 1918 @ 0915	S.E.5a (F5625)	Balloon	Destroyed	Prisches	
17	23 October 1918 @ 1115	S.E.5a (F5625)	Fokker D.VII	Destroyed	South of Fontaine	
18	27 October 1918 @ 0910	S.E.5a (E4071)	Fokker D.VII	Out of control	Esquéhéries	
19	28 October 1918 @ 0750	S.E.5a (E5963)	LVG C	Destroyed	La Queue-de-Boué	
20	30 October 1918 @ 0930	S.E.5a (H685)	Fokker D.VII	Destroyed	Forêt de Nouvion	

== Death ==
Southey died on 17 April 1920 as a result of a skull fracture following a motorcycling accident, suffered while he was riding to work. He is buried at Ladywell Cemetery, near Brockley, London, England, in Plot 103J.

== See also ==
- List of World War I flying aces
