= John Steel Ralston =

Scottish World War I war hero and flying ace

- Born: 27 April 1887; Bothwell, Lanarkshire, Scotland
- Died: 25 July 1918 (aged 31) (KIA)
- Military career
- Allegiance: United Kingdom
- Branch: British Army; Royal Air Force
- Service years: 1915–1918
- Rank: Captain
- Units: Scottish Rifles; No. 24 Squadron RFC; No. 71 Squadron RFC; No. 84 Squadron RAF
- Conflicts: World War I • Western Front
- Awards: Military Cross; Distinguished Flying Cross

Captain John Steel Ralston MC, DFC (27 April 1887 – 25 July 1918) was a Scottish World War I war hero and flying ace. After winning a Military Cross in 1916 for lifesaving gallantry while serving in the infantry, he was credited with 12 official aerial victories as a fighter pilot before he was killed in action.

== Biography ==
Ralston was born in Bothwell, Lanarkshire, Scotland, the youngest of five children born to Thomas Binnie Ralston, an iron merchant, and his wife Mary Chalmers (née Steel), and was educated at The Glasgow Academy.

During the First World War, Ralston originally served with the 8th Battalion, Scottish Rifles, being commissioned as a second lieutenant on 25 August 1915. In November 1916, he won the Military Cross for rescuing a wounded comrade under fire.

Ralston was seconded to the Royal Flying Corps in March 1917 at Aboukir, Egypt. He was appointed a flying officer on 12 June 1917. He was promoted to lieutenant on 1 September. He was originally assigned to No. 71 Squadron RFC. Once assigned to No. 84 Squadron RFC in October as a Royal Aircraft Factory SE.5a pilot, he began to succeed in aerial warfare. On 21 October 1917, he and Kenneth Leask drove down a German reconnaissance aircraft out of control. Ten days later, Ralston drove down an Albatros D.V out of control for his second win. He would not score again until 6 December, when he teamed with Robert Grosvenor to drive down another German reconnaissance aircraft. On 23 December, he ended his year with his fourth "out of control" victory, driving down another reconnaissance aircraft.

On 13 January 1918, Ralston became an ace when he destroyed a German two-seater reconnaissance aircraft over Crevecoeur. He subsequently transferred to No. 24 Squadron RFC. On 26 January, Ralston was appointed a flight commander with the accompanying rank of temporary captain. On 16 February, he drove down an Albatros D.V., being wounded in the fight. Upon recovery, he reverted to 84 Squadron as a flight commander. There was a lapse then, as he did not score again until 18 June 1918, when he drove down a Fokker D.VII. Nine days later, he put down a Pfalz D.III near Villers-Bretonneux. However, he was also shot down; he crash-landed in flames and escaped unscathed. Then in July, he scored his final four wins, destroying three balloons, and assisting Norman Mawle in the destruction of a Fokker D.VII. Ralston would be awarded the Distinguished Flying Cross posthumously for his exploits, as he died on the day of his last victory, balloon busting south of Warvillers on 25 July 1918. His final tally was three balloons and two aircraft destroyed and seven aircraft driven down out of control.

== Honours and awards ==
Military Cross
2nd Lt. John Steel Ralston, Scottish Rifles

"For conspicuous gallantry in action. He carried a wounded man 100 yards across the open under heavy fire. He has displayed great courage and coolness throughout the operations.

Distinguished Flying Cross
Lieut. (T./Capt.) John Steel Ralston, M.C. (Scottish Rifles, T.F.).

"An intrepid patrol leader who in recent operations has accounted for three enemy machines and three kite balloons. Recently while on patrol he advanced to attack a kite balloon; on his approach the balloon party began to haul it down, but forcing home his attack, he shot the balloon down in flames. In the engagement this officer was seriously wounded. Suffering great pain, he flew back to our lines and tried to land, but fainted and crashed.
