= Edward Pennell =

British WWI flying ace (1894–1974)

Edward Robert Pennell
- Born: 23 May 1894; Forest Gate, London
- Died: 1974 (aged 79–80); Clacton-on-Sea, Essex, England
- Burial place: Colchester Crematorium
- Military career
- Allegiance: United Kingdom
- Branch: Royal Navy; British Army; Royal Air Force
- Service years: 1910–1919; 1940–1944
- Rank: Flight Lieutenant
- Nickname: Ted
- Units: Honourable Artillery Company; No. 27 Squadron RFC; No. 84 Squadron RFC
- Conflicts: World War I • Western Front; World War II
- Awards: Distinguished Flying Cross; Croix de Guerre (France)

Flight Lieutenant Edward Robert Pennell DFC (1894–1974) was a British World War I flying ace credited with five aerial victories. He returned to military service during World War II.

== World War I ==
Pennell originally joined the Royal Navy in 1910, at the age of 16, but soon left and joined the Honourable Artillery Company, part of the Territorial Force. On the outbreak of the war he was mobilized for service and served as a corporal in the HAC. He was commissioned as a temporary second lieutenant to serve in the Royal Flying Corps on 5 August 1916, and was appointed a flying officer on 28 November.

He served in No. 27 Squadron for the first half of 1917, flying a Martinsyde G.100 "Elephant" single-seat fighter-bomber, claiming his first victory on 19 March by driving down out of control a Halberstadt D.II over Havrincourt Wood. On 14 July he received permission to wear the Croix de Guerre awarded to him by the French government.

He then transferred into the newly formed No. 84 Squadron on 23 July to fly the S.E.5a single-seat fighter. Pennell was appointed a flight commander with the temporary rank of captain on 1 September. He destroyed an observation balloon over Raillencourt on 22 November, and a DFW Type C reconnaissance aircraft on 30 November over Honnecourt. He accounted for two further reconnaissance aircraft driven down out of control; firstly on 23 December 1917 north of St. Quentin, shared with Second Lieutenant William H. Brown, and secondly in January 1918 over Villers-Outréaux. His final total was a balloon and two aircraft destroyed and two aircraft driven down out of control. He was promoted to lieutenant in February 1918, but was hospitalized the following day, ending his active service.

On 3 June 1918 the King instituted a new decoration—the Distinguished Flying Cross—to be awarded to officers and warrant officers for "acts of gallantry when flying in active operations against the enemy." Pennell was one of the first recipients. He was eventually transferred to the unemployed list in January 1919.

== Inter-war career ==
Pennell returned to Clacton-on-Sea where he went into business, becoming a property developer, and a partner in a restaurant, and two cinemas. He was also elected to the local Urban District Council, serving as chairman in 1927–28.

== World War II ==
Pennell was granted a commission in the Royal Air Force Volunteer Reserve "for the duration of hostilities" as a probationary pilot officer on 16 January 1940. He was granted the war substantive rank of flying officer on 31 August 1940, and was promoted to flight lieutenant on 1 June 1942. He served as a liaison officer at a flying school in the United States, but eventually relinquished his commission on account of ill-health on 23 August 1944.

== Post-war ==
Pennell returned to his home in Clacton, and served as Chairman of the Urban District Council twice more, in 1946–1948 and 1953–1954, and as chairman and long-standing member of several committees. He was a member of the Royal Air Forces Association, the Clacton Club, and the local Conservative Club, and was a keen golfer and fisherman. He died in 1974.

== Bibliography ==
- Shores, Christopher F.; Franks, Norman & Guest, Russell F. (1990). Above the Trenches: a Complete Record of the Fighter Aces and Units of the British Empire Air Forces 1915–1920. London, UK: Grub Street. ISBN 978-0-948817-19-9.
