= Vaughn College of Aeronautics and Technology =

Private college in East Elmhurst, New York, U.S.

Vaughn College of Aeronautics & Technology
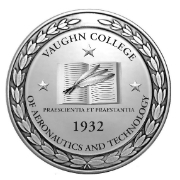
- Other names: Vaughn College
- Former names: College of Aeronautics (September 1986 – September 2004); Casey Jones School of Aeronautics (1932 – September 1986)
- Motto: "praescientia et praestantia"
- Motto in English: Vision and Excellence
- Type: Private; Space grant
- Established: 1932; 94 years ago
- Founders: Charles S. "Casey" Jones; George A. Vaughn Jr.; Lee D. Warrender
- Endowment: $25.4 million (2020)
- President: Sharon B. DeVivo
- Academic staff: 135+
- Students: 1442 (fall 2020)
- Undergraduates: 1438 (fall 2020)
- Postgraduates: 4 (fall 2020)
- Other students: Full-time: 1176; Part-time: 266
- Location: 86-01 23rd Ave, East Elmhurst, New York, 11369, U.S. 40.7678°N 73.8825°W
- Campus: Urban
- Newspaper: Vaughn Magazine
- Colors: Maroon and white
- Sporting affiliations: Hudson Valley Intercollegiate Athletic Conference
- Mascot: Phoenix
- Website: www.vaughn.edu
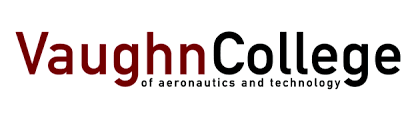

Vaughn College of Aeronautics and Technology (commonly called Vaughn College) is a private college in East Elmhurst, New York, specialized in aviation and engineering education. It is adjacent to LaGuardia Airport but was founded in Newark, New Jersey, in 1932 before moving to New York City in 1940. The college's most recent name change, to honor a founder, was on September 1, 2004.

== History ==
In 1929, Charles S. "Casey" Jones, a pioneer aviator and aviation company executive, foresaw the need for highly trained technicians to design, build and service aircraft and engines. George A. Vaughn Jr. and Lee D. Warrender joined with Charles S. "Casey" Jones in founding the Casey Jones School of Aeronautics, the predecessor of the Academy of Aeronautics, and after September 1986, the College of Aeronautics. Effective September 1, 2004, the Board of Regents of the State of New York approved the institution changing its name from the College of Aeronautics to Vaughn College of Aeronautics and Technology.

=== Founding ===
Mayor Fiorello Henry La Guardia laid the cornerstone of the academy building in 1940, shortly after the opening of LaGuardia Field. Mayor La Guardia wanted an aviation school to teach and train young people in the aviation technologies at his new airport. At the time, his friend and flying comrade of World War I, Charles ("Casey") S. Jones, was operating the Casey Jones School of Aeronautics near Newark Airport. In early 1940, the mayor convinced Casey to establish a school near LaGuardia airport, across the Grand Central Parkway. It was founded by Jones, a well-known racing pilot of the 1920s; George Augustus Vaughn, Jr., second-ranking ace of World War I; and Lee D. Warrender, an aeronautical engineer. The Casey Jones School educated and trained 20,000 men and women who supported the nation's successful air effort during World War II.

Following World War II, the Casey Jones school was consolidated with the Academy of Aeronautics, and returned to the civilian aviation industry. In the fall of 1964, the Academy of Aeronautics conferred associate in applied science degrees for the first time, and, in 1969, the academy was accredited by the Middle States Association of Colleges and Schools. In 1996, the college completely revised its curriculum offering, resulting in nine new academic programs, including for the first time, the Bachelor of Science and an associate degree in flight. On May 5, 1998, a 35,000-square-foot addition to the building complex was completed.

=== Expansion ===
In the fall of 1964, the Academy of Aeronautics conferred associate in applied science degrees for the first time. In 1969, the academy was accredited by the Middle States Association of Colleges and Schools. In 1996, the college completely revised its curriculum offering, resulting in nine new academic programs, including for the first time, the Bachelor of Science and an associate degree in flight. On May 5, 1998, a state-of-the-art 35,000-square-foot (3,300 m^{2}) addition to the building complex was completed. It includes a 65-foot (20 m) observation tower providing views of the runways at LaGuardia airport.

In 2010 a 126-foot (38 m) mural depicting early aviation that had been painted by Aline Rhonie Hofheimer in hangar F at Roosevelt Field was transferred to Vaughn and will be displayed following renovations. The mural is planned to be moved to the Cradle of Aviation Museum in March 2025.

== Organization and administration ==
=== College president ===
The Colleges current president is Sharon B. DeVivo.

=== Affiliation ===
- Accreditation Board for Engineering and Technology
- Middle States Association of Colleges and Schools

== Academics ==
Vaughn College has an enrollment of approximately 1200 students as of 2023. It provides associate degrees, bachelor's degrees, and master's degrees in engineering, technology, aviation, and management. The Aviation Training Institute at Vaughn offers the Federal Aviation Administration (FAA) Airframe and Powerplant maintenance certificate. Vaughn is the only college in New York to offer the engineering program Mechatronics. Developed at MIT, Mechatronics is a combination of several engineering types including Mechanical Engineering, Electrical Engineering and Computer Engineering.

The institution is also designated by the FAA as a Collegiate Training Institute and offers a non-degree air traffic control program for those wishing to pursue a career in this field. The associate in Applied Science (AAS) in Avionics, the associate in applied science (AAS) degree in Aeronautical Engineering Technology, and the Bachelor of Science (BS) degree in Electronic Engineering Technology, as well as the Bachelor of Science (B.S) degree in Mechanical Engineering Technology are accredited by the Technology Accreditation Commission of the Accreditation Board for Engineering and Technology (ABET). Vaughn College has strong relations with aerospace industries like Northrop Grumman, NASA and Lockheed Martin.

Vaughn College of Aeronautics and Technology has also received specialized accreditation for its business programs through the International Assembly for Collegiate Business Education (IACBE). The programs accredited by the IACBE are the Associate of Applied Science in Airport Management and the Bachelor of Science in Airport Management, Airline Management and General Management.

Prior to obtaining a four-year degree at Vaughn College in some degree programs, one has to complete an internship performing the role for which the student has studied. Many students land their first post-graduate job in this manner. Vaughn has close ties to many airports and airlines due in part to its close proximity to the local airports such as John F. Kennedy International Airport and LGA in Queens, Westchester and Farmingdale in New York, Teterboro and Newark, New Jersey, and several nearby airports in Connecticut.

=== Library ===
The library is housed in the main campus. The library has management, flight training and engineering materials, as well as flight simulators. Vaughn began work on the new library in the spring of 2012. As of December 2012, the construction was unfinished. Numerous, minor fires have caused serious setbacks to the original renovation schedule.

Several classes are held in the Residence Hall's lounges due to this construction.

=== Management ===
The management programs at Vaughn College of Aeronautics and Technology includes general management, airline management and airport management. Graduates of these programs are able to secure entry-level to mid-level management positions in small or large corporations and in airports. The field of airport management is a unique discipline with its roots in general business, but driven by the high-tech world of aviation and transportation. Students of the airport management degree program concentrate on subjects as diverse as wildlife hazards, eco-system management, airfield safety, and emergency planning and control. The Bachelor of Science airport management degree was developed to provide students proficiency in all areas of airport operations. The location of the college, adjacent to LaGuardia Airport, provides a learning environment with regard to activities, resources and personnel. Students are given the ability to investigate first-hand the areas of airport management, control of ground vehicles, communication systems, airport security, fire and rescue service, terminal planning and management, and airport maintenance.

=== Engineering and technology ===
Vaughn College of Aeronautics and Technology offers bachelor and associate degree programs in the field of technology including electronic engineering technology with an Avionics concentration and electronic technology with a concentration in general electronics. The mechanical engineering technology program offers concentrations in computer-aided design and aeronautical options, as well as the associate in applied science degrees in computerized design and animated graphics. A Bachelor of Science (B.S.) is also offered in Mechatronics Engineering. This program has received accreditation by ABET.

=== Aviation ===
Vaughn College has designed degree programs for aviation school students interested in becoming professional pilots and other entry-level operations careers in the aviation industry, as well as related government agencies. All aircraft operations (flight) degree programs offered by Vaughn College of Aeronautics and Technology include the academic liberal arts and sciences, as well as specific courses in flight that also count as the "ground school" portion of flight instruction. In order to complete Vaughn College's degree programs, students must complete all degree requirements, as well as pass the Federal Aviation Administration's (FAA) written pilot exams. Students may also choose to complete an AAS or BS degree in aircraft operations without completing the flight portion. These students are also eligible to participate in the FAA's Air Traffic Control Collegiate Training Initiative. Students have the option of pursuing careers with aviation-related government agencies such as the FAA or the National Transportation Safety Board. FAA ground qualifications also assist students in a variety of aviation careers, including ground instructor, flight dispatcher, accident investigator, aviation administrator and aviation researcher.

=== ROTC ===
Students may participate in the Air Force ROTC program headquartered at Manhattan University. Students may participate in the U.S. Army ROTC program through NYC Army ROTC, headquartered at Fordham University.

=== Civil Air Patrol Unit ===
Academy Cadet Squadron, a subordinate unit of the New York City Group of the Civil Air Patrol, meets every Friday at the college. Members of the cadet program often apply to the college after high school graduation and remain cadets until 21 years of age.

Cadet membership is available for anyone aged 12 to 18 with the opportunity to remain a cadet until 21 once they have joined. Adult members, called "officers" or formerly "Senior Members", are anywhere from 19 to 21 years of age and serve as staff members in the squadron. Cadets are offered free orientation flight and leadership opportunities. Cadet officers, Cadet Second Lieutenants or higher, are eligible to receive college scholarships on behalf of the Civil Air Patrol's sponsors in the private and public sectors.

=== Rankings and recognition ===
Vaughn was recognized as having the highest upward mobility rate among 2,137 colleges in a January 18, 2017 article published in The New York Times. Vaughn College was noted as "an institution doing more to impact social mobility for those who start from less fortunate means" and listed as the top institution for moving students from the bottom 40 percent to the top 40 percent in income. The article stems from a study conducted by The Equality of Opportunity Project titled Mobility Report Cards: The Role of Colleges in Intergenerational Mobility.

The college was ranked among the best Baccalaureate colleges in the 2017 edition of the U.S. News & World Report college rankings. Vaughn was also ranked the most racially diverse and the most economically diverse in the North. Vaughn was relisted in the U.S. News & World Report ranking for 2010.

The Air Traffic-Collegiate Training Initiative (AT-CTI) program is a partnership between the Federal Aviation Administration (FAA) and Vaughn College of Aeronautics and Technology to provide the academic preparation necessary for students interested in air traffic control careers. Vaughn's air traffic control college is one of 36 aviation colleges in the country selected by the FAA to participate in this program that allows the air traffic control college to recommend its graduates to the FAA for hire as air traffic controllers.
