= Edwin A. Clear =

Edwin Arnold Clear
- Born: 28 May 1896; London, England
- Died: 21 February 1960 (aged 63); London, England
- Military career
- Allegiance: United Kingdom
- Branch: British Army; Royal Air Force
- Service years: ca. 1915–1919; 1923–1935
- Rank: Lieutenant
- Unit: No. 84 Squadron RAF
- Conflicts: World War I
- Awards: Military Cross

Lieutenant Edwin Arnold Clear MC (28 May 1896 – 21 February 1960) was an English World War I flying ace credited with twelve aerial victories. Most unusually for a Royal Air Force ace of the era, all of his victories involved destruction of the enemy aircraft. Ill-health forced him to resign from the RAF in 1919, but he served in the RAF Reserve from 1923 to 1935.

== World War I ==
Clear originally joined the Royal Flying Corps at the same time as his younger brother Harold, being issued consecutive service numbers (Harold later became a prisoner of war after being shot down behind the German lines). After spending 20 months in Egypt as a vehicle mechanic he was accepted for pilot training, and on 28 April 1917 1st Class Air Mechanic Clear was transferred, and appointed a probationary temporary second lieutenant, being confirmed in the rank on 27 June.

He began his training before departing Egypt, at both Heliopolis and Aboukir. He then returned to England for further training at the Central Flying School at RAF Upavon. He was commissioned in September 1917, and assigned to 84 Squadron in France the following month as a SE.5a pilot.

His first aerial success came on 29 January 1918, when he set a German observation aircraft afire in midair. After a lull, he destroyed another two-seater on 10 March. Five days later, he shot down his first enemy fighter, an Albatros D.V. Then, on 17 March, he was engaged in a dogfight when two of his opponents collided with one another; Clear was credited with both and became an ace. He finished March with a victory on the 30th.

On 12 April, Clear shot down an enemy aircraft on both morning and evening patrols. On the 25th, he downed two more German aircraft within ten minutes. After a month's lapse, he destroyed another Albatros D.V for his final victory on 28 May. In June 1918, he was removed from combat duty and returned to England to train as an instructor, and was awarded the Military Cross for his efforts.

== Post World War I ==
Clear remained in the nascent Royal Air Force. He remained on flight duty, and was charged for court-martial for flying under a bridge. On 3 May 1919, he escaped from confinement, "borrowed" a SE.5a from RAF Shotwick, and took off. He got lost, and landed on the Isle of Man. After discovering his location, he took off again to impress bystanders with his aerobatics. When his engine cut out, he crashed on the present site of Ronaldsway Airport. He suffered minor injuries, was re-arrested, and returned to his duty station at Chester on 8 May 1919. This was the first air crash to occur on the Isle of Man.

He denied the original incident but freely admitted taking the aircraft. He faced a court martial at Chester in July 1919. Remarkably his sentence was only to lose his seniority in rank, although the Advocate General did later discuss and confirm that he could have his pay docked to pay for the loss of the aircraft. On 10 September 1919 Clear relinquished his commission on account of ill-health caused by his wounds, but was permitted to retain his rank.

Despite his previous infractions, Clear was granted a probationary commission as a flying officer in the Reserve of Air Force Officers on 31 July 1923; he was confirmed in this rank on 31 January 1924.

On 31 July 1932, Clear was transferred from Class A to Class C within the Reserves. Health problems forced his resignation as of 16 January 1935; he was allowed to retain his rank.

In the early 1930s Clear's mental health began to deteriorate, resulting in him eventually being admitted to the Bethlem Royal Hospital.

In the National Register taken in 1939 Clear is described as a "Clerk Railways Managing" and a patient at the Bethlem Royal Hospital at Eden Park in Monks Orchard, Beckenham Kent. (Note: Bethlem Royal Hospital moved to Monks Orchard in 1930)

Clear died on 15 February 1960 at St Pancras Hospital in London. (Note: His address given was 29 Bridstow Place, Paddington)

== Honours and awards ==
Military Cross
Temporary Second Lieutenant Edward Arnold Clear, General List, Royal Flying Corps.
For conspicuous gallantry and devotion to duty. During an encounter between one of our patrols and nine enemy machines, he observed an enemy triplane which was about to attack his patrol leader from the rear. He at once dived to the attack, firing on the enemy machine, which turned to avoid him and collided with an enemy scout. The two enemy machines crashed to earth locked together. On the following day, during an engagement between 12 of our machines and about 30 enemy scouts, he attacked an enemy triplane which he observed beneath him. He dived after it, and, following it down, eventually destroyed it. He has destroyed seven enemy machines, and has proved himself a most enterprising and courageous pilot.
