= Kenneth Leask =

Royal Air Force Air Vice-Marshal (1896-1974)

Kenneth Malise St. Clair Graeme Leask
- Born: 30 October 1896; Southsea, Hampshire, England
- Died: 24 April 1974 (aged 77); Chalfont St Peter, Buckinghamshire, England
- Military career
- Allegiance: United Kingdom
- Branch: British Army (1914–1918); Royal Air Force (1918–1949)
- Service years: 1914–1949
- Rank: Air vice-marshal
- Units: Devonshire Regiment; Machine Gun Corps; No. 42 Squadron RFC; No. 41 Squadron RFC; No. 84 Squadron RFC/RAF; No. 208 Squadron RAF
- Commands: No. 24 Group RAF (1944–1947); No. 43 Group RAF (1940–1943); No. 60 Squadron RAF (1932–1933); No. 24 Squadron RAF (1926)
- Conflicts: First World War; Western Front; Second World War
- Awards: Companion of the Order of the Bath; Military Cross & Bar; Mentioned in dispatches

Air Vice Marshal Kenneth Malise St. Clair Graeme Leask, CB, MC & Bar, AMIMechE (30 October 1896 – 24 April 1974) was a senior officer of the Royal Air Force (RAF). He began his career in the British Army and served with the Royal Flying Corps in the First World War, being credited with eight aerial victories to become a flying ace. He flew over 100 sorties, and survived three forced landings. He attained the rank of captain, and position as flight commander, in No. 84 Squadron. He remained in the RAF after the war, being appointed Director-General of Engineering in the Air Ministry with the rank of air vice marshal after the Second World War.

== Early life ==
Leask was born in Southsea on 30 October 1896, the son of a doctor.

== Military career ==
=== First World War ===
Leask joined the British Army soon after the outbreak of the First World War, being commissioned as a temporary second lieutenant in the 11th Battalion, Devonshire Regiment on 19 November 1914, just after his 18th birthday. The 11th Devonshire was a reserve training battalion, based in Wareham, Dorset, which provided the 8th and 9th Battalions, serving in France, with reinforcements and replacements. Leask was later transferred to the Machine Gun Corps, serving as an instructor.

Leask transferred into the Royal Flying Corps (RFC) in May 1916, and was granted Royal Aero Club Aviators' Certificate No. 3673 at the Central Flying School at Upavon on 20 July. He was appointed a flying officer, and transferred to the General List, the same day. He was assigned to duty with the RFC on 1 October, and was posted to No. 42 Squadron, flying B.E.s until December, when he transferred to No. 41 Squadron flying F.E.8s. He was appointed a flight commander with the temporary rank of captain on 10 January 1917, and in May he returned to England to serve as an instructor. He later joined No. 84 Squadron, taking command of "A" Flight, and returning to France in September. Flying a S.E.5a, Leask gained his first aerial victories on 21 October 1917, when he and John Steele Ralston drove down out of control a German Type C reconnaissance aircraft east of the Roulers–Menin road, and twenty minutes later Leask drove down an Albatros D.V solo. He drove down another D.V over Menin on 31 October, and destroyed another reconnaissance aircraft south-east of Bouzincourt on 30 November. His fifth victory came on 30 January 1918 by driving down another D.V over Villers-Outréaux, making him a flying ace. His last three victories came in March, with three more D.Vs, two destroyed and one driven down, on the 6th at Renansart, the 18th at Wassigny, and the 23rd north-east of Ham.

Leask was awarded the Military Cross, which was gazetted on 26 March 1918. His citation, published on 23 August, read:

Second Lieutenant (Temporary Captain) Kenneth Malise St. Clair Graeme Leask. Devonshire Regiment and Royal Flying Corps. For conspicuous gallantry and devotion to duty in leading offensive patrols against superior numbers of the enemy. His patrol twice engaged more than double their own numbers and drove the enemy back into their own lines. He drove down three enemy machines, which, were seen to be destroyed, and accounted for eleven in all. He showed splendid determination and initiative.

On 1 April 1918, the Army's RFC and the Royal Naval Air Service were merged to form the Royal Air Force (RAF). That day Leask flew his final sorties with No. 84 Squadron, making three forced landings. These were the last of over 100 operational missions he flew with the squadron.

On 21 June Leask was awarded a second Military Cross. His citation read:

Second Lieutenant (Temporary Captain) Kenneth Malise St. Clair Graeme Leask, MC, Devonshire Regiment and Royal Flying Corps. For conspicuous gallantry and devotion to duty. He attacked a formation of five enemy scouts, one of which he destroyed. Later, he carried out a very valuable reconnaissance at a height of 160 ft (49 m) in order to locate the enemy's position. While thus engaged he observed a large column of enemy troops advancing along a road. He dived down to a height of about 30 ft (9 m) and attacked and scattered them, and held up their advance for a considerable time. He has done splendid work in attacking enemy troops from a low altitude, showing great courage, and determination under heavy fire.

=== Inter-war career ===
On 1 August 1919 Leask was granted a permanent commission in the RAF with the rank of flight lieutenant, resigning his army commission the same day. On 3 July 1920, during the Royal Air Force Aerial Pageant at Hendon Aerodrome, Leask took part in a mock aerial combat in which his Bristol F.2 Fighter was pitted against two Sopwith Snipes flown by Flight Lieutenant Arthur Coningham and Flying Officer C. E. Gibbs.

From 8 February 1921 Leask served as a flight commander in No. 208 Squadron, based at RAF Ismailia, Egypt. In late 1922, during the Chanak Crisis, his squadron was moved in Bakırköy district, Turkey. On 31 August 1923 at the British Consulate in Constantinople, Leask married Lydia Alexandrovna, the widow of Y. Genot, and daughter of General Modestoff, of Tver, Russia.

In 1924 Leask was assigned to the Air Staff in the Directorate of Operations and Intelligence, and was promoted to squadron leader on 1 July 1925. Leask commanded No. 24 Squadron at RAF Kenley from 25 March to 25 May 1926, then attended the 21st Course at the Senior Officers' School at Sheerness until 20 August. After taking the Officers Engineering Course at the Home Aircraft Depot from 16 September 1926, he was appointed Engineering Officer and second in command of No. 4 Apprentices Wing at No. 1 School of Technical Training at RAF Halton on 20 August 1928. On 8 October 1929 he was posted to the RAF Aircraft Depot in India, before serving as Officer Commanding No. 60 (Bomber) Squadron, based at RAF Kohat, from 20 February 1932.

On 1 January 1933 Leask was promoted to wing commander, and then served as Senior Equipment Staff Officer at the Headquarters of RAF India from 3 February until 7 September 1934. On 3 February 1935 he was appointed Senior Engineering Staff Officer at the Headquarters of Air Defence of Great Britain, then as an Engineering Staff Officer, and then Senior Engineering Officer at the Headquarters of RAF Bomber Command from 14 July 1936. Leask was promoted to group captain on 1 January 1938.

=== Second World War ===
Leask was transferred to the RAF's Technical Branch on 24 April 1940, and was appointed an acting air commodore to serve as Air Officer Commanding (AOC) No. 43 (Maintenance) Group (part of RAF Maintenance Command) from 20 November. On 1 January 1941 he received a mention in despatches from his Air Officer Commanding-in-Chief. On 1 June 1941 he was promoted to the temporary rank of air commodore, and on 21 August 1942 he was appointed an acting air vice marshal. A year later, on 21 August 1943, his temporary appointment as an air commodore was made war substantive. He became AOC, No 24 (Technical Training) Group (part of RAF Technical Training Command) on 10 January 1944.

== Post-war career ==
Leask was appointed a temporary air vice marshal on 1 January 1946, and this promotion was made permanent on 1 October. In March 1947 he was appointed Director-General of Servicing and Maintenance at the Air Ministry, and on 5 January 1948 he became Director-General of Engineering. Leask retired from the RAF at his own request on 1 December 1949.

In February 1950 Leask was appointed the manager of de Jersey & Co. (Finland) Ltd., based in Helsinki, dealing with the company's exports of engineering products from the UK.

Leask and his wife Lydia were killed in a car crash at Chalfont St Peter on 24 April 1974, near to their home at Chalfont St Giles.
