= William Henry Brown (aviator) =

Canadian flying ace (1894–1969)

- Born: 12 March 1894; Victoria, British Columbia, Canada
- Died: 28 February 1969 (aged 74); Steilacoom, Washington, U.S.
- Military career
- Allegiance: Canada
- Branch: Canadian Expeditionary Force; Royal Flying Corps
- Rank: Lieutenant
- Nickname: "Harry"
- Unit: No. 84 Squadron RAF
- Awards: Military Cross

Lieutenant William Henry Brown was a Canadian World War I flying ace credited with nine aerial victories.

== Early life ==
William Henry Brown was born in Victoria, British Columbia, Canada on 12 March 1894. He joined the 1st Canadian Signal Corps of the Canadian Expeditionary Force to serve in World War I. After two years with Signals, he transferred to the Royal Flying Corps in early 1917.

== World War I ==
By August 1917, Brown was posted to 84 Squadron as a fighter pilot. He scored his first aerial victory with them on 26 November 1917, and would continue to score with them until 3 April 1918. Five days later, he was transferred off combat duty and returned to Home Establishment in England. He won a Military Cross for his valour. As the award citation makes clear, his bravery in dogfights was not the only reason for his medal; ground attacks against enemy troops were also prized.

Brown's Military Cross was gazetted on 22 June 1918:

....Whilst bombing an enemy aerodrome his squadron was attacked by a formation of 40 enemy scouts. He engaged one of these with the result that it dived straight to the ground. He was then attacked by another machine, and by skilful piloting he succeeded in firing at close range behind its tail, with the result that it fell on its back and went down out of control. Later, whilst leading a low-flying attack on enemy troops he dropped four bombs from a very low altitude, scattering the enemy in all directions, and then at a height of 300 feet engaging them with machine gun fire. Shortly afterwards he attacked two enemy two-seater planes, crashing them both to earth. In addition to these he has shot down out of control four other hostile machines, and has displayed throughout the recent operations marked gallantry and skill.

== Post World War I ==
Lt. W.H. Brown, M.C., married Marjorie Hirst of Victoria B.C. on March 26, 1921 at St. Mary's Church, Oak Bay. After their honeymoon in the Seattle area, he took up his job as air-navigator at Jericho Beach Air Station in Vancouver, B.C.

Their subsequent life is a mystery until his death on 28 February 1969 in Steilacoom, Washington, USA.

== List of aerial victories ==
No.	Date/time	Aircraft	Foe	Result	Location	Notes
1	28 November 1917 @ 0800 hours	Royal Aircraft Factory SE.5a serial number B559	Albatros D.V	Driven down out of control	Between Fonsommes and Mont-d'Origny	
2	23 December 1917 @ 1300 hours	Royal Aircraft Factory SE.5a s/n B559	German reconnaissance plane	Driven down out of control	North of Saint-Quentin	Victory shared with Edward Pennell
3	10 March 1918 @ 1420 hours	Royal Aircraft Factory SE.5a s/n C5384	German reconnaissance plane	Driven down out of control	Bellicourt	
4	17 March 1918 @ 1730 hours	Royal Aircraft Factory SE.5a s/n C9263	Fokker Triplane	Driven down out of control	Crevecoeur	
5	18 March 1918 @ 1130 hours	Royal Aircraft Factory SE.5a s/n C9263	Albatros D.V	Driven down out of control	Saint-Souplet	
6	18 March 1918 @ 1130 hours	Royal Aircraft Factory SE.5a s/n C9263	Albatros D.V	Driven down out of control	Saint-Souplet	
7	25 March 1918 @ 0920 hours	Royal Aircraft Factory SE.5a s/n C9267	German reconnaissance plane	Destroyed	Flers	
8	25 March 1918 @ 0930 hours	Royal Aircraft Factory SE.5a s/n C9267	German reconnaissance plane	Set on fire; destroyed	Flers	Victory shared with Robert Grosvenor
9	3 April 1918 @ 1200 hours	Royal Aircraft Factory SE.5a s/n C9263	Albatros D.V	Driven down out of control	West of Villers-Bretonneux	
