= Norman Mawle =

Norman William Reginald Mawle
- Born: 27 January 1897; Banbury, Oxfordshire, England
- Died: 28 December 1971 (aged 74); Leicester, Leicestershire, England
- Military career
- Allegiance: United Kingdom
- Branch: British Army; Royal Air Force
- Rank: Group captain
- Nickname: "Bill"
- Units: No. 7 Squadron RFC; No. 84 Squadron RAF; No. 913 (County of Warwick) Balloon Squadron AAF
- Commands: No. 911 (County of Warwick) Balloon Squadron AAF
- Awards: Distinguished Flying Cross; Order of the British Empire

Group Captain Norman William Reginald Mawle OBE, DFC, JP (27 February 1897–28 December 1971) was a British World War I flying ace. He was credited with 12 official aerial victories during the First World War. During World War II, he returned to his country's service, not retiring until 1954.

== Early life ==
Norman William Reginald Mawle was born in Banbury on 27 February 1897.

== World War I ==
Cadet Norman Mawle of the Inns of Court Officers' Training Corps was commissioned as a second lieutenant on 5 September 1916. He was seconded as a flying officer to the Royal Flying Corps on 27 December 1917. He was attached to No. 5 Squadron RFC for five weeks. Mawle was promoted to lieutenant on 5 March 1918.

On 22 May 1918, Mawle was assigned to No. 84 Squadron RAF as a Royal Aircraft Factory SE.5 pilot. His original assigned aircraft was substandard, and he would not have success until it was wrecked by another pilot, and replaced. Using SE.5 serial number D6917, he destroyed a German observation balloon at Proyart for his first victory, on 17 July 1918. Three days later, he busted another balloon and destroyed a Fokker D.VII. A broken connecting rod in the engine moved Mawle out of his customary plane into SE.5 serial number C1868; on 24 July, he used it to team with Captain John Ralston to destroy a Fokker D.VII over Warfusée.

Once back in his familiar machine, he helped destroy an LVG reconnaissance plane on 29 July 1918 for his fifth win. The following day, he drove one Fokker D.VII spinning down out of control. Two other Fokker D.VIIs in the fight collided and went down; they were credited to Mawle. On 4 August, he destroyed another balloon. Three days later, Mawle destroyed a Fokker D.VII and drove another down out of control. The following day, he burned a German balloon for his twelfth and final victory. While strafing two horse-drawn German balloons, Mawle was severely wounded in the stomach and arm by ground fire. He managed to return to base, but was removed from combat duty.

On 2 November 1918, Mawle received the Distinguished Flying Cross for his exploits. His citation read:

Lieutenant Norman William Reginald Mawle (London Regiment)

"A courageous and skillful leader, who has destroyed nine enemy machines and four kite balloons. While leading his patrol of five scouts, he observed a hostile formation of fifteen scouts. Nothing daunted by the disparity in numbers, he at once engaged them, driving down three himself. During a recent patrol he engaged two kite balloons, one of which he shot down in flames at 25 feet altitude. Later, he attacked an anti-tank gun, stampeding the horses and causing the gun to overturn in a ditch. In this patrol he was seriously wounded, but flew his machine back to his aerodrome."

== Between the wars ==
In November 1934, Mawle was executor on an estate in Hounslow; his address was given as Oadby, Leicestershire.

== World War II and beyond ==
Mawle was promoted from flight lieutenant to squadron leader and simultaneously transferred from No. 913 (County of Warwick) Balloon Squadron AAF to command of No. 911 (County of Warwick) Balloon Squadron AAF on 6 June 1939. On 1 September 1941, Mawle was promoted to temporary wing commander in the Balloon Branch of the Auxiliary Air Force of the Royal Air Force after being appointed Commanding Officer of RAF Norton, Sheffield, which was the home of 16 Balloon Centre tasked with defending Sheffield and Rotherham. As of 1 July 1942, he dropped the "temporary" designation. On 24 April 1944, Mawle transferred to administrative duties.

Mawle retired from the Royal Auxiliary Air Force on 10 February 1954, as a wing commander retaining the rank of group captain.

Mawle was serving as a magistrate and as Chairman of the West Bromwich Savings Committee, when he was made an Officer of the Order of the British Empire in the 1962 Birthday Honours.
