= Roy Manzer =

Canadian World War I flying ace

- Born: 31 August 1896; Maple Creek, Saskatchewan, Canada
- Died: 26 August 1956 (aged 59); Victoria, British Columbia, Canada
- Military career
- Allegiance: Canada
- Branch: Royal Flying Corps; Royal Canadian Artillery
- Service years: 1917–1919
- Rank: Captain
- Unit: No. 84 Squadron RAF
- Awards: Distinguished Flying Cross

Captain Roy Manzer, DFC QC was a Canadian World War I flying ace credited with 12 official aerial victories. After his aerial military service, he returned to Canada and a long and distinguished legal and civic career.

== Early life ==
There is dispute about where Roy Manzer was born. One report insists on Medicine Hat, Alberta, Canada on 31 August 1896. Another unattributed report says Maple Creek, Saskatchewan and gives the same birthdate.

== World War I ==
On 24 October 1917, Manzer was commissioned a second lieutenant in the Royal Flying Corps.

He scored his first aerial victory as a pilot of Royal Aircraft Factory SE.5a serial number D259 with No. 84 Squadron RAF. On 25 April 1918, he destroyed a German Albatros D.V east of Abancourt. Next to fall in ruins was a Fokker triplane, on 16 May 1918. On the 28th, he doubled up, driving one Albatros D.V down out of control over Warfusée and destroying another. Manzer knocked down the latter in a midair collision that smashed his opponent's top wing with the SE.5s landing gear in an unusual maneuver. On 18 June, he switched to SE.5a number C8171 and destroyed another Triplane to become an ace.

Manzer would switch to SE.5a serial number C8732 for the remainder of his wins. He would drive down a new Fokker D.VII on 29 June 1918. On 19 July, he would join the ranks of the balloon busters, burning a German observation balloon near Le Quesnel. On 28 and 29 July, he would share victories with George Vaughn, as they destroyed Rumplers both days. Manzer set another Fokker D.VII afire on 3 August 1918. The next day, he destroyed another Albatros D.V. He also scored his final victory that day, destroying a Pfalz D.III. The following day, he would be brought down by ground fire while on a trench strafing mission. He sat out the remaining months of the war in captivity.

Lieutenant Manzer was promoted to the rank of temporary captain on 7 August 1918.

== Post World War I ==
Manzer was transferred to the unemployed list of the Royal Air Force on 12 March 1919. Manzer went on to serve in the Royal Canadian Artillery.

After education at the University of Toronto, he articled with the law firm of Blackstock and Clow in Medicine Hat, Canada. By 1923, he had become one of the principal solicitors in the firm, which became Blackstock, Clow, and Manzer. He joined the bar in 1924, and became one of the partners of the legal firm of Manzer and Wooton in Victoria, British Columbia.

By 1940, he was also active in mining, as a director of Slade Placers Ltd. In 1944, he served as Registrar to the Diocese of British Columbia. From 1947 to 1949, he served as the unpaid Reeve to the District of Oak Bay, British Columbia.

At the time of his death, Roy Manzer had been honored with an appointment as a Queen's Counsel.

== Honours and awards ==
Distinguished Flying Cross
Lieutenant Roy Manzer

"While carrying out a solitary patrol he observed a two-seater below him; diving on it he opened fire, and following it down to 1,000 feet, caused it to land outside the aerodrome. During his return to our lines he saw a hostile kite balloon; attacking it as it was being hauled down he closed to point blank range at 300 feet altitude; on reaching the ground, the balloon burst into flames. In addition to the above, this officer has accounted for seven enemy machines, four of which were destroyed and three driven down out of control."
