= Hugh Saunders (RAF officer) =

Royal Air Force Air Chief Marshal (1894-1987)

Sir Hugh Saunders
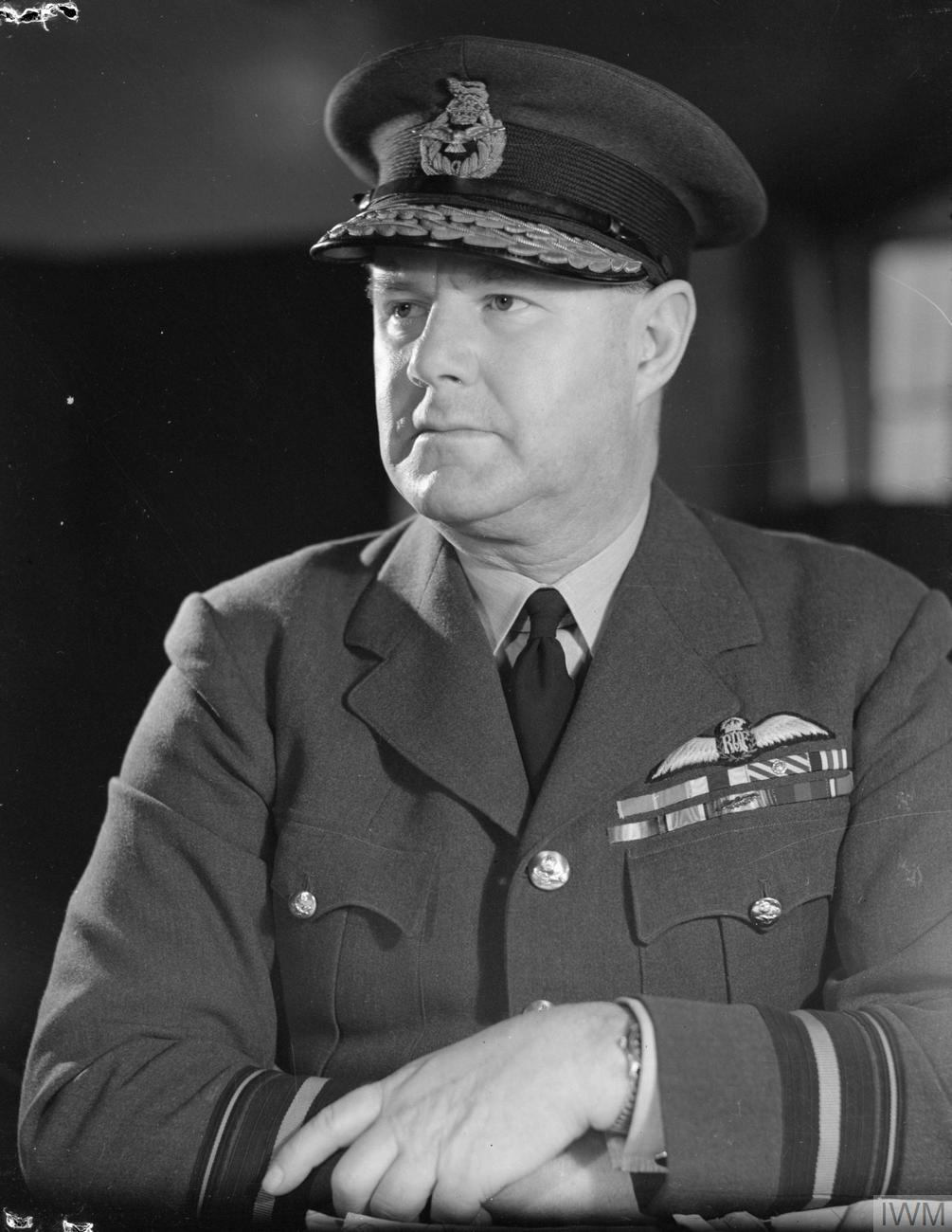
- Hugh Saunders as Air Officer Commanding No. 11 Group during the Second World War
- Born: 24 August 1894; Germiston, South Africa
- Died: 8 May 1987 (aged 92); Ringwood and Fordingbridge, England
- Military career
- Allegiance: South Africa; United Kingdom
- Branch: South African Army (1914–17); Royal Air Force (1917–53)
- Service years: 1914–1953
- Rank: Air Chief Marshal
- Nickname: Dingbat
- Commands: Air Forces Western Europe (1951–53); Inspector-General of the RAF (1949–51); Air Member for Personnel (1947–49); Bomber Command (1947); RAF Burma (1945–47); No. 11 Group (1942–44); Chief of the RNZAF Air Staff (1939–41); No. 45 Squadron (1932–35)
- Conflicts: First World War; Iraqi revolt Second World War
- Awards: Knight Grand Cross of the Order of the Bath; Knight Commander of the Order of the British Empire; Military Cross; Distinguished Flying Cross & Bar; Military Medal; Mentioned in Despatches; Commander's Cross with Star of the Order of Polonia Restituta (Poland); Commander of the Legion of Merit (United States); Officer of the Legion of Honour (France); Grand Cross of the Order of the Dannebrog (Denmark)

Air Chief Marshal Sir Hugh William Lumsden Saunders, GCB, KBE, MC, DFC & Bar, MM (24 August 1894 – 8 May 1987) was a South African aviator who rose through the ranks to become a senior Royal Air Force commander.

== RAF career ==
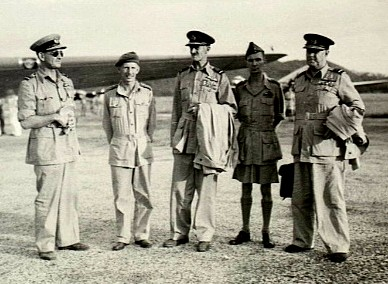
Air Marshal Sir Hugh Saunders (far right), Air Vice Marshal Adrian Cole (far left) as RAAF Liaison Officer to SEAC, with Air Chief Marshal Sir Keith Park (centre), near Penang, c. August 1945

Saunders enlisted with the Witwatersrand Rifles Regiment in 1914 at the start of the First World War and then served in the South African Rifles before becoming a pilot in No. 84 Squadron of the Royal Flying Corps, and sometimes flew as a wingman of fellow South African, RAF flying ace Andrew Beauchamp-Proctor. He became a triple ace, with 15 victories credited to him. He was promoted to squadron leader on 29 May 1929. He was appointed Officer Commanding No. 45 Squadron in 1932.

Saunders served in the Second World War, initially as Chief of Staff for the Royal New Zealand Air Force before becoming Air Officer Administration at Headquarters Fighter Command in February 1942 and then being made Air Officer Commanding No. 11 Group in November 1942. He was made Director-General of Personnel at the Air Ministry in November 1944.

At the end of the war, he was made Air Officer Commanding RAF Burma before becoming Air Officer Commanding-in-Chief Bomber Command in January 1947. He went on to be Air Member for Personnel in October 1947, Inspector-General of the RAF in October 1949 and Commander-in-Chief at Headquarters Air Forces Western Europe in February 1951. He was appointed Air Deputy to Supreme Allied Commander Europe and retired in September 1953.

== Post-retirement ==
Following a series of fatal accidents in the newly established Royal Danish Air Force (RDAF), Saunders was invited to serve as a special advisor to the Minister of Defence of Denmark in 1954, in order to reorganise and, it was envisioned, bring the number of accidents in RDAF down. Saunders indeed reorganised the RDAF and, realising that most of the equipment/planes were of a tactical nature, established Tactical Air Command Denmark as the supreme HQ of RDAF. In addition, a number of specialist commands were established, training improved and gradually the accident rate fell. He served in Denmark until 1956 and received the Grand Cross of the Order of the Dannebrog for his service.

Military offices
Preceded by Ralph Cochrane	Chief of the Air Staff (RNZAF); 1939–1941	Succeeded by Victor Goddard
Preceded by Trafford Leigh-Mallory	Air Officer Commanding No. 11 Group; 1942–1944	Succeeded by John Cole-Hamilton
Preceded by Sir Norman Bottomley	Commander-in-Chief Bomber Command; January – October 1947	Succeeded by Sir Aubrey Ellwood
Preceded by Sir John Slessor	Air Member for Personnel; 1947–1949	Succeeded by Sir Leslie Hollinghurst
Preceded by Sir Leslie Hollinghurst	Inspector-General of the RAF; 1949–1951	Succeeded by Sir James Robb
New title Command formed	Air Deputy to SACEUR; 1951–1953	Succeeded by Lauris Norstad
