= Carl Frederick Falkenberg =

- Born: 4 February 1897; Botwood, Newfoundland
- Died: 7 October 1980 (aged 83); Edmonton, Alberta, Canada
- Military career
- Allegiance: Canada; United Kingdom
- Branch: Canadian Army (1915–17); British Army (1917–18); Royal Air Force (1918–19); Royal Canadian Air Force (1919)
- Service years: 1915–1919
- Rank: Captain
- Unit: No. 84 Squadron RAF
- Conflicts: First World War
- Awards: Distinguished Flying Cross & Bar; Air Force Cross

Carl Frederick Falkenberg, DFC & Bar, AFC (4 February 1897 – 7 October 1980) was a Canadian First World War flying ace, credited with 17 aerial victories. Falkenberg was a personal friend of Canadian Prime Minister Lester B. Pearson.
