= Percy Hobson (RAF officer) =

British World War I flying ace

Percy Kyme Hobson
- Born: 20 November 1893; Fleet Hargate, Lincolnshire, England
- Died: 20 October 1967 (aged 73); South Africa
- Military career
- Allegiance: United Kingdom
- Branch: British Army; Royal Air Force
- Service years: 1914–1919
- Rank: Captain
- Units: Honourable Artillery Company; No. 84 Squadron RAF
- Conflicts: World War I; Western Front
- Awards: Military Cross

Captain Percy Kyme Hobson MC (20 November 1893 – 20 October 1967) was a British World War I flying ace credited with seven aerial victories.

== Biography ==
=== Early life and education ===
Hobson was born at his parents' farm at Church End, Fleet Hargate, near Holbeach in Lincolnshire. He attended local schools at Fleet and Long Sutton, before being sent to a boarding school at Dursley, Gloucestershire, and then attended Framlingham College, Suffolk, between 1905 and 1909. He was, in his own words, "excellent at nothing". His family moved to another farm at Bungay, Suffolk, and Hobson worked there during the holidays. After leaving school he gained an apprenticeship at Mann Egerton as an electrician, but "learned nothing except to blow fuses". In 1912, aged 18, his father bought him a ticket to Canada. Hobson sailed aboard the RMS Empress of Ireland from Liverpool to Quebec, with only £5 in his pocket. He first worked on a farm in Ayr, Ontario, and later worked as painter in an agricultural implements factory. After a year he moved to Buffalo, New York, working in a store cleaning fur coats, then served as a deckhand on a lake steamer. He eventually jumped ship at Port Arthur, Ontario, and rode a freight train to Winnipeg to work on a farm, until he saved enough money to take the train to Vancouver, where he worked as a carpenter building houses in Victoria, Vancouver Island, and as a handyman at a cement works at Bamberton. When the war broke out in August 1914, Hobson returned to England, travelling via train from Seattle to New York, then to Liverpool aboard the RMS Lusitania.

=== World War I ===
Hobson enlisted into the Honourable Artillery Company, serving as a driver, but eventually transferred to the Royal Flying Corps on 10 May 1917, having spent "...a hell of a long time messing about the South and East Anglia..." After ground training as a cadet he was commissioned as a temporary second lieutenant (on probation) on 21 June. He was posted to Salisbury Plain for flying instruction, and noted that the "flying instructors were a hard-hearted lot of bastards – after 20 minutes dual instruction I was sent up solo by a Scot named Blackwood – managed to get down all in one piece, I was lucky, but many weren't – the number killed was terrific." He was confirmed in his rank on 27 September, and posted to No. 84 Squadron in France on 22 October, where his commanding officer was Sholto Douglas. Hobson, despite "...not knowing how to really fly a machine much less fight it..." was thrown into action, and noted "It was cheerful to be posted to a squadron where I found the majority of recent additions writing letters "To be opened when I have gone"." However, "...more by good luck than anything I managed to get away with it and survived."

Hobson, flying a S.E.5a single-seat fighter, gained his first aerial victory on 13 February 1918, shooting down an Albatros D.V north-east of St. Quentin. A few days later, on 18 February, he drove down another 'out of control' over Beaurevoir. On 13 March he shot down and killed Oberleutnant zur See Konrad Mettlich, commander of Jasta 8 over Remaucourt, and on the 16th he and Lieutenant George Owen Johnson destroyed a LVG C reconnaissance aircraft over Villers-Outréaux.

During the German spring offensive of March and April the Allies were pushed back, and for a time No. 84 Squadron were based at a different aerodrome every night. They were reassigned from high level fighter patrols to a ground attack role, which made them more vulnerable to anti-aircraft fire, and Hobson noted that "...it was nothing to come home with 150 to 200 bullet holes in the machine...". Despite this he gained three more victories, accounting for two more Albatros's and a Fokker Dr.I between 20 and 23 April.

He was subsequently awarded the Military Cross, which was gazetted on 22 June 1918. His citation read:

Temporary 2nd Lieutenant Percy Kyme Hobson, General List and RFC.

For conspicuous gallantry and devotion to duty. Observing a large body of troops with transport, he descended to within 200 feet, and, despite very severe enemy rifle and machine gun fire from the ground, dropped four bombs, three of which were direct hits on the transport, causing severe casualties, which were increased by the accurate machine gun fire brought to bear on his target. On a later occasion, he observed a large body of troops moving across the open, and attacked these with bombs and machine gun fire, causing many casualties and scattering them in all directions. He has been responsible for the destruction of four enemy machines, and has at all times shown a complete disregard for personal danger.

Hobson returned to England, flying night patrols over London, and being promoted to the acting rank of captain on 1 September 1918. He then served as a flying instructor, before eventually leaving the Royal Air Force on 26 April 1919.

=== Post-war ===
After the war Hobson decided to seek his fortune in South Africa, arriving at Cape Town in January 1920. He made his way to Malalane in the Eastern Transvaal, where his uncle had a farm. He and another ex-RFC man managed to make a living growing vegetables, but in 1927, he moved further north, gaining a position as a store manager in Broken Hill, Northern Rhodesia (now Kabwe, Zambia). He was then employed as a driver by the transportation company of E. Cort "Billy" Dunn, a former major in the Royal Engineers. On 22 December 1928 he married Colleen Islay Halliwell at St Mary's Cathedral, Johannesburg.

In 1930 he and Andrew Thatcher, another of Dunn's drivers, founded their own transportation company "Thatcher & Hobson", initially with a single Chevrolet 1½-tonner bought on hire purchase. They were soon running three vehicles, mainly between Broken Hill and Abercorn (now Mbala), and also gained contracts from Loangwa Concessions to transport their personnel, and later a mail contract. With the onset of Great Depression, much economic activity in the country ceased, and Thatcher & Hobson were threatened with bankruptcy. However, they won a contract to transport aviation fuel to Mpika, where Imperial Airways had constructed a way-point on the air route from Europe to South Africa, and managed to survive, even opening a branch at Lusaka for operations on the Great East Road to Fort Jameson (now Chipata).

The company prospered, and later added a fleet of buses to its commercial freight operations. In 1948 Thatcher and Hobson supplied Piper Cubs to the Flying Club of Northern Rhodesia, which had been closed down at the outbreak of World War II, and struggled to restart afterwards. By 1954 the Thatcher, Hobson & Co. passenger and goods transport business was operating 250 trucks and buses, when it was taken over by the United Transport Company, and renamed Central African Road Services. Hobson had reportedly left the business some time before to farm in Tanganyika.

Hobson died in 1967, aged 73. His remains are interred at Stellawood Cemetery and Crematorium in Durban, South Africa.
