= Sidney Highwood =

British World War I flying ace and balloon buster

Sidney William Highwood
- Born: 30 December 1896; Marden, Kent, England
- Died: 1975 (aged 78–79); Kent, England
- Military career
- Allegiance: United Kingdom
- Branch: British Army; Royal Air Force
- Rank: Captain
- Units: Queen's Own (Royal West Kent Regiment); No. 84 Squadron RAF
- Awards: Distinguished Flying Cross & Bar

Captain Sidney William Highwood DFC* (30 December 1896 – 1975) was a British World War I flying ace and balloon buster credited with sixteen aerial victories.

== Biography ==
Highwood was born in Marden, Kent, to William and Sarah Highwood, of Hertsfield Farm. He first served as a private in the Queen's Own (Royal West Kent Regiment). In 1917, he transferred to the Royal Flying Corps, and on 11 October was commissioned as a temporary second lieutenant (on probation), being confirmed in his rank on 22 March 1918.

He was posted to No. 84 Squadron on 20 May 1918, flying the S.E.5a, between 8 August and 30 October he accounted for nine enemy observation balloons, five Fokker D.VII fighters, and two Rumpler reconnaissance aircraft, for which he was twice awarded the Distinguished Flying Cross.

On 9 October 1918, he was appointed a flight commander with the acting rank of captain, but left the RAF after the end of the war, being transferred to the unemployed list on 2 March 1919.

After the war, Highwood returned to the family business of growing fruit and vegetables, acquiring Sheerland Farm in Pluckley, Kent, in 1929.

== Honours and awards ==
Distinguished Flying Cross
Lieutenant Sidney William Highwood

"An Officer of exceptional skill and courage who, since 8 August, has accounted for nine enemy aircraft, driving down five kite balloons in flames, destroying two enemy machines, and shooting down two others out of control".

Bar to the Distinguished Flying Cross
Lieutenant (Acting Captain) Sidney William Highwood, DFC.

"A courageous officer who has proved himself a skilled and bold fighter. Since 2 October he has destroyed three enemy machines and four kite balloons, and has in addition rendered valuable service in attacking enemy troops on the ground".
