= No. 84 Squadron RAF =

Flying squadron of the Royal Air Force

- Squadron badge
- Active: 7 Jan 1917 – 30 January 1920; 13 Aug 1920 – 20 February 1953; 20 Feb 1953 – 31 October 1971; 17 Jan 1972 – present
- Country: United Kingdom
- Branch: Royal Air Force
- Type: Flying squadron
- Role: Multi-role helicopter support
- Part of: British Forces Cyprus
- Home station: RAF Akrotiri, Cyprus
- Mottos: Scorpiones pungunt (Latin for 'Scorpions sting')
- Battle honours: Western Front (1917–1918)*; Cambrai (1917); Somme (1918)*; Amiens; Hindenburg Line*; Iraq (1920); Iraq (1923–1925); Iraq (1928–1929); Egypt and Libya (1940–1942)*; Greece (1940–1941)*; Iraq (1941)*; Habbaniya; Iraq (1941); Malaya (1942)*; North Burma (1944)*; Manipur (1944); * Honours marked with an asterisk are those emblazoned on the Squadron Standard

Commanders
- Notable commanders: William Sholto Douglas; Francis Fogarty

Insignia
- Squadron badge heraldry: A scorpion, reflecting the squadron's long association with the Middle East. Approved by King George VI in December 1936.
- Squadron codes: UR (Apr 1939 – Sep 1939); VA (Sep 1939 – Mar 1941); PY (Jan 1945 – Dec 1946) ♠ ♥ ♣ ♦ (Wessex and Griffin)

Aircraft flown
- Utility helicopter: Jupiter HC.2 helicopter.

No. 84 Squadron of the Royal Air Force is at present a Search and Rescue Squadron based at RAF Akrotiri. The squadron transitioned from the previously operated Bell Griffin HAR.2 to operate the Puma HC.2 in 2023, until the Puma's retirement in 2025. In 2025/26, the squadron was reported reforming on the Jupiter HC.2 helicopter.

Although originally formed at Beaulieu in 1917 as part of the RFC, it was already in France when the RAF came into being, and as of 2024, 84 Squadron is the only remaining RAF squadron that spent its entire service history abroad. It is currently one of the two operational parts of the RAF Search and Rescue Force left in service (the other being the RAF Mountain Rescue Service) after the stand-down of the UK effort on 5 October 2015.

== History ==
=== First World War ===
No. 84 Squadron of the Royal Flying Corps (RFC) was formed on 16 February 1917 at East Boldre (Beaulieu) under the command of Major Hazelton Nicholl. It was equipped with a variety of types for training purposes, including Avro 504Ks, a Curtiss JN, Royal Aircraft Factory B.E.2s, Royal Aircraft Factory B.E.12s, Nieuport 12s and Sopwith 1½ Strutters. The squadron started to receive its intended operational equipment, the Royal Aircraft Factory S.E.5a single-seat fighter, in July 1917, although at first its SE.5as suffered engine problems, delaying the squadron's workup. On 8 August, Nicholl was replaced as commanding officer by the experienced major Sholto Douglas, who had already commanded 43 Squadron.

The squadron moved to France for service over the Western front in September 1917, equipped with SE.5as. Initial operations were patrols and escort duties over Flanders, and when the Battle of Cambrai took place in November–December that year, the squadron flew top cover for aircraft carrying out ground attack and artillery spotting duties, while countering German attempts to attack British troops. From December 1917, the squadron joined the 5th Brigade of the Royal Flying Corps, operating in support of the British Fifth Army. In January 1918, it added ground-attack operations to its normal fighter duties, with the squadron heavily committed to ground-attack duties during the German spring offensive from March 1918. One speciality of the squadron was the destruction of German observation balloons, with one of the squadron's pilots, Andrew Beauchamp-Proctor, claiming 16 destroyed as well as 22 enemy aeroplanes. Beauchamp-Proctor was awarded the Victoria Cross for his efforts. In total the squadron had claimed 129 German aeroplanes and 50 balloons destroyed by the end of the war on 11 November 1918. The squadron deployed to Germany as part of the British occupation forces until August 1919 when discarded its SE.5as and returned to the United Kingdom as a Cadre in August 1919. It was disbanded on 30 January 1920.

The squadron's aces during the First World War included Andrew Beauchamp-Proctor, Hugh Saunders and Walter A. Southey.

=== Between the wars ===
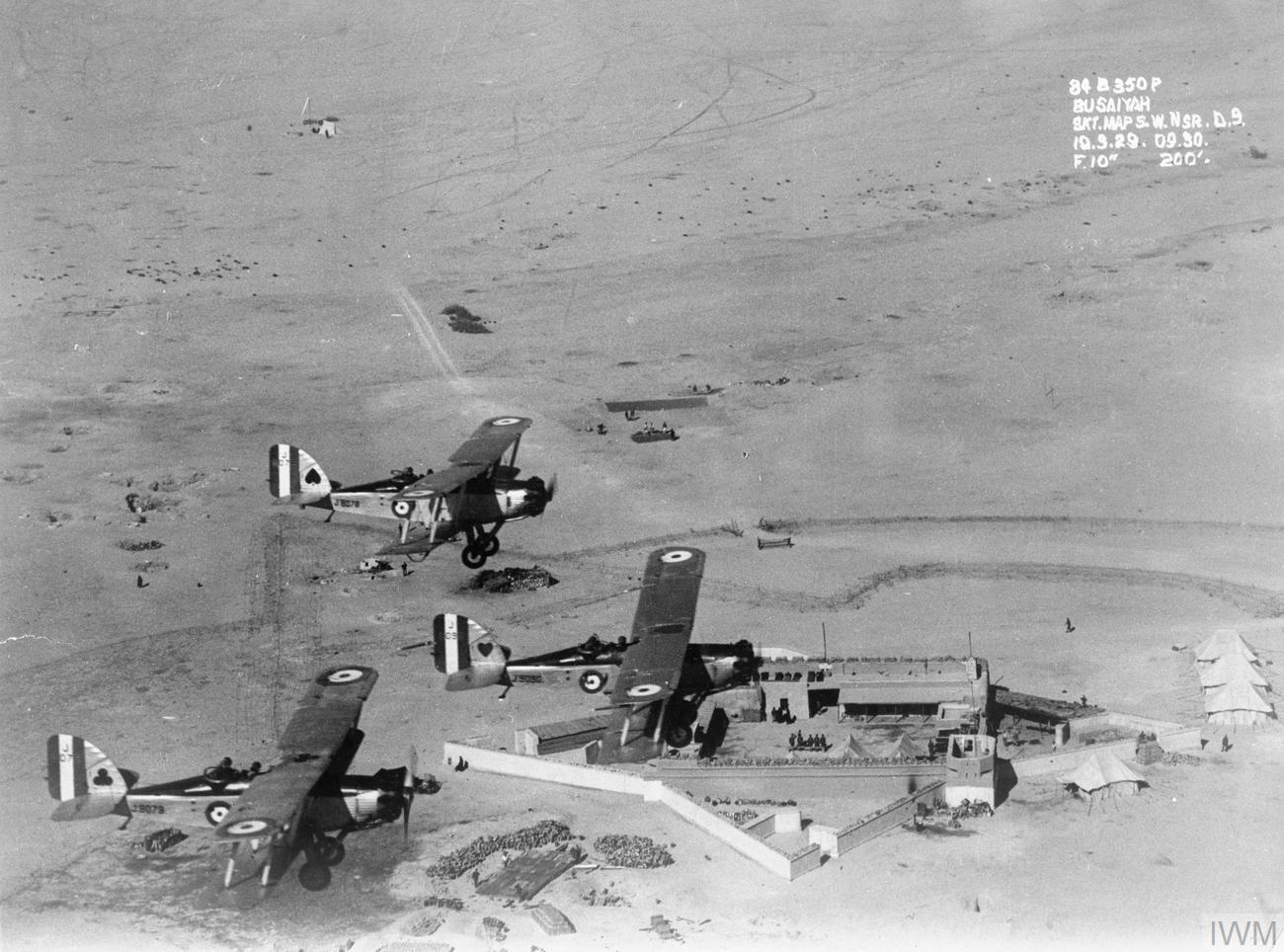
Three 84 Squadron Westland Wapitis

The squadron was reformed on 13 August 1920 at Baghdad in Iraq, moving to RAF Shaibah in September, where it remained for the next 20 years. Its initial equipment was DH.9As (until January 1929) and these were replaced by Wapitis (beginning July 1928), Vincents (December 1935) and Blenheims Mk.Is (February 1939).

One of the squadron's artefacts is a pair of pink frilly knickers known as 'Jane's Panties'. These were presented to the squadron in 1936 by Jane Newman (a debutante from Australia) who was rescued by 84 squadron when her aircraft crashed in the Western Desert. This story may more accurately relate to the location and rescue by Vickers Vincent aircraft of 84 Squadron of Imperial Airways Handley Page H.P. 42E G-AAUC Horsa which forced landed on 29 August 1936, in the Arabian Desert south of Salwa Wells in Qatar, having overflown Bahrain airport. Miss Jane Wallace Smith, an American novelist is named as the presenter of the undergarments to the squadron.

=== Second World War ===
The squadron flew its first combat operation of the war on 15 August 1940, when six 84 Squadron Blenheims, which were being ferried from Iraq to Aden to reinforce the Blenheim squadrons based there, encountered an Italian Savoia-Marchetti SM.81 near Kamaran Island and shot it down. It moved to RAF Heliopolis in Egypt in September 1940, operating from forward bases at Fuka and Qotaifiya for operations against the Germans from October 1940. The Italian invasion of Greece in October 1940 resulted in Britain diverting much of its aerial strength to support the Greeks, and 84 Squadron was moved to Greece in November 1940. The squadron operated from Menidi near Athens, initially bombing Italian forces on the Albanian front, but as the Italian offensive stalled in December 1940, switched to attacks against the port of Valona and the airfield at Berat, both in Italian-occupied Albania. In April 1941 German forces invaded Greece, quickly over-running the Greek and British defences, and the few surviving Blenheims were evacuated via Crete on 21 April.

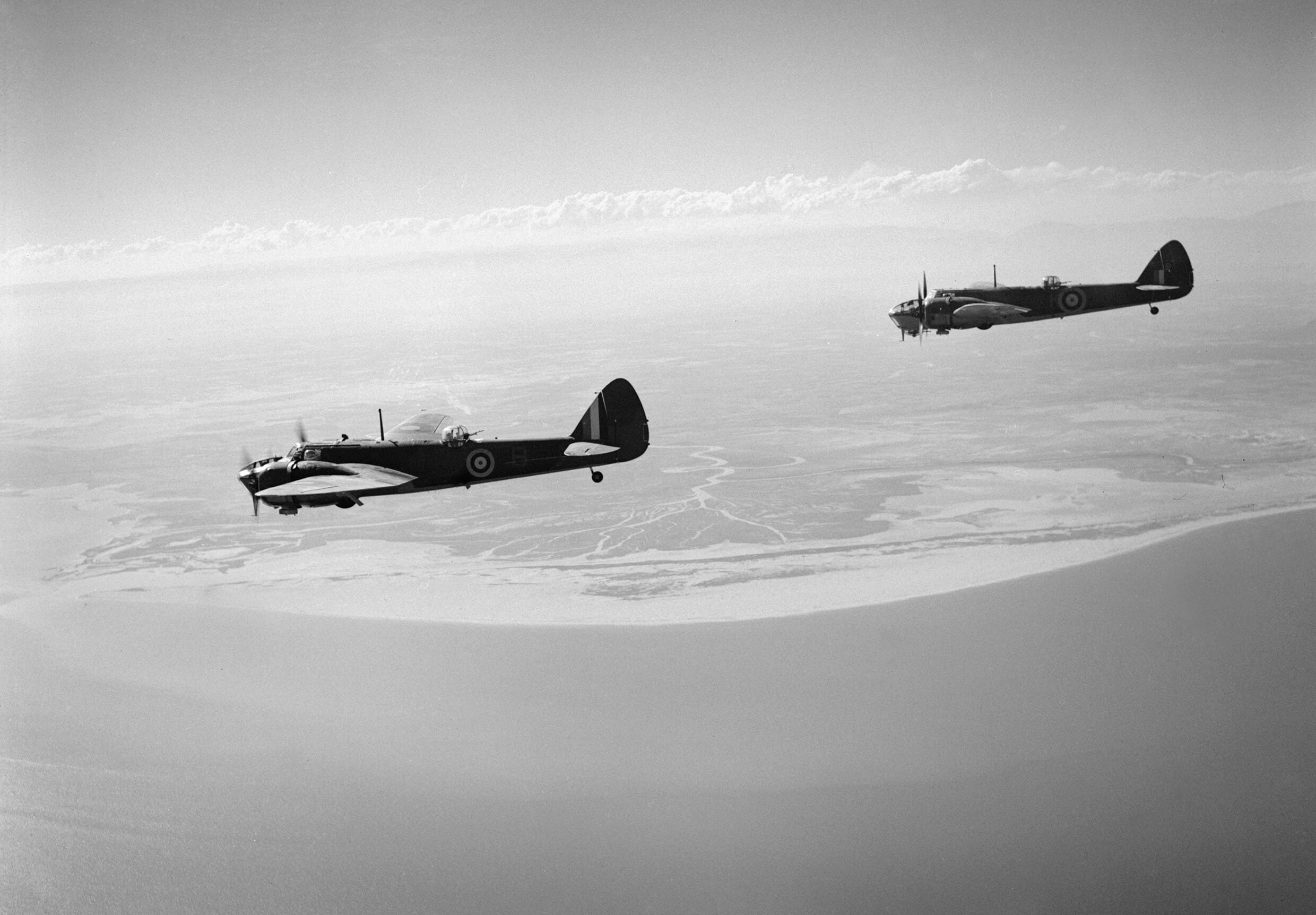
Blenheims of 84 and 203 Squadrons en route to Vichy French targets in Syria

The squadron moved to RAF Aqir in Palestine on 27 April as a result of tensions between Britain and Iraq. When hostilities broke out on 2 May, with Iraqi forces threatening the RAF base at Habbaniya, west of Baghdad, 84 Squadron supported the forces sent to relieve Habbaniya, and when Germany and Italy sent air reinforcements to Iraq via airfields in Vichy-French Syria, carried out attacks on these airfields. Operations against Iraqi forces continued until 31 May when the pro-German Iraqi Prime-Minister, Rashid Ali fled and an armistice was signed. The squadron then took part in the invasion of Syria and Lebanon, taking part in attacks on Vichy French airfields and reconnaissance missions. In 25–28 August 1941, the squadron took part in the Anglo-Soviet invasion of Iran. By November, it had returned to Egypt and operations over the Western Desert.

The Japanese invasion of Malaya resulted in 84 Squadron being one of a number of squadrons ordered to reinforce British and Commonwealth forces in the Far East, with the squadron arriving in Sumatra in late January 1942. The squadron evacuated to Java in February 1942 following the Japanese Invasion of Sumatra, but lost its remaining Blenheims and twenty of its personnel during the Battle of Kalijati when Japanese troops attacked and captured the base of the RAF's bombers in Java. In March 1942, eleven members of 84 Squadron commandeered a lifeboat and sailed away from Java to escape the advancing Japanese forces. They made land 47 days later in north-western Australia. The lifeboat was named 'Scorpion' in honour of the Squadron Badge.

During the course of allied operations against the Japanese Imperial Army in the Far East during the Second World War, more than one hundred of 84 Squadron’s personnel, most of them ‘Other Ranks’, were captured by the Japanese and sent to prisoner-of-war camps in the region. Though the exact number and timing of 84 Squadron men who were taken as prisoners-of-war is not readily available, it is known that one hundred and nineteen later died in captivity between the 9th September 1942 and the 5th September 1945, the longest recorded period of captivity before death being two years and eleven months. Fifty-four of that number perished on seven of the Japanese Hell Ships, the Suez Maru, the Nichinan Maru, the Tamahoko Maru, the Junyo Maru, the Maros Maru, the Kenzen Maru and Transport 125, their deaths resulting from execution, drowning or sickness. These deaths took place between November 1943 and November 1944 when the Japanese forces were in retreat and prisoners-of-war were being transported by ship to other camps. The names of ninety-seven 84 Squadron men who died whilst in captivity of the Japanese during the Second World War but whose bodies were never recovered are honoured on the Singapore Memorial.

The squadron reformed at Karachi on 17 March 1942, moving to Drigh Road airfield on 1 April, equipping with more Blenheims and moving to Quetta in June, where it discarded its Blenheims. In December 1942, the squadron, now based at Vizagapatam on the East coast of India (now known as Visakhapatnam), received its planned operational equipment, the Vultee Vengeance dive bomber. Training was delayed by slow deliveries of Vengeances, and while other squadrons began operations in March, 84 Squadron moved to Ceylon in April, to guard the island against potential Japanese attack. The squadron relieved 45 Squadron based at Kumbhirgram in Assam on 10 February and flew its first operational mission with the Vengeance on 16 February. It flew its Vengeances in support of the second Chindit operation behind Japanese lines and against the Japanese offensive against Imphal and Kohima.

After the Japanese retreat from Imphal and Kohima, it was decided to withdraw the Vengeance from operational service in Burma, as more versatile fighter bombers were becoming available in increasing numbers and the Vengeance would not be able to carry out its normal dive-bombing attacks once the monsoon season was underway. 84 Squadron flew its last bombing raid with the Vengeance on 16 July. After withdrawal from the front line, the squadron discarded its Vengeances, and used Airspeed Oxfords to train its aircrews on twin-engined aircraft in preparation for operating De Havilland Mosquitos, but it did not receive Mosquitos until February 1945. It was still training when the Second World War ended in September 1945.

=== Postwar ===
The squadron moved to Singapore in September 1945, but in November a detachment was sent to Java in response to the Indonesian war of independence, flying reconnaissance and bombing missions against Indonesian republican forces. The rest of the squadron moved to Java in January 1946, remaining there until May, when it moved to Kuala Lumpur in Malaya. By this time the squadron's Mosquitos were suffering structural problems caused by gluing failures, and in November 1946 the squadron re-equipped with the Bristol Beaufighter which it flew until March 1949, re-equipping with Bristol Brigands at RAF Habbaniya in Iraq, becoming the first squadron equipped with Brigands.

In February 1950, four Brigands were detached to Mogadishu, joining a detachment from 8 Squadron flying support for the British withdrawal from Somalia. In April 1950, the squadron was transferred to RAF Tengah on Singapore to take part in Operation Firedog, the RAFs response to the Malayan Emergency. The Brigands were employed on strikes against insurgent strongholds with guns, rockets and bombs. Operations were affected by a number of problems with the Brigand, including the loss of several aircraft due to cannon explosions, which resulted in the aircraft being prohibited from firing their guns for several months, problems with the aircraft's propellers, which again caused the loss of several aircraft, and the development of skin cracks, which caused the Brigand's bombload to be restricted. In January 1953, following the crash of a Brigand after one of its wings had failed during a dive, the squadron's Brigands were permanently grounded.

The squadron was disbanded on 20 February 1953, but on the same day, 204 Squadron, a transport squadron equipped with Vickers Valettas based at RAF Fayid in Egypt, was renumbered to No. 84 Squadron. The squadron was used mainly for routine transport flights around the Middle East, until British forces left Egypt in March 1956, with the squadron moving to RAF Nicosia in Cyprus. The squadron took part in Operation Musketeer, the Anglo-French invasion of Egypt during the Suez Crisis, in November 1956, its Valettas carrying out paratroop drops. The squadron moved to RAF Khormaksar, Aden in January 1957, carrying out transport operations around the Arabian peninsular, and in particular, supporting the British Army in the Aden Protectorate. In June 1958 it received a flight of four-engined Blackburn Beverley heavy transports to supplement its Valettas, and in August 1960 the squadron's Valetta flight was detached to become No. 233 Squadron RAF. In late 1967, the Beverley was replaced by the Hawker Siddeley Andover, and when UK forces left Aden the squadron moved to RAF Sharjah, then in the Trucial States (now the United Arab Emirates). The squadron was disbanded at Muharraq on 31 October 1971.

=== Cyprus ===
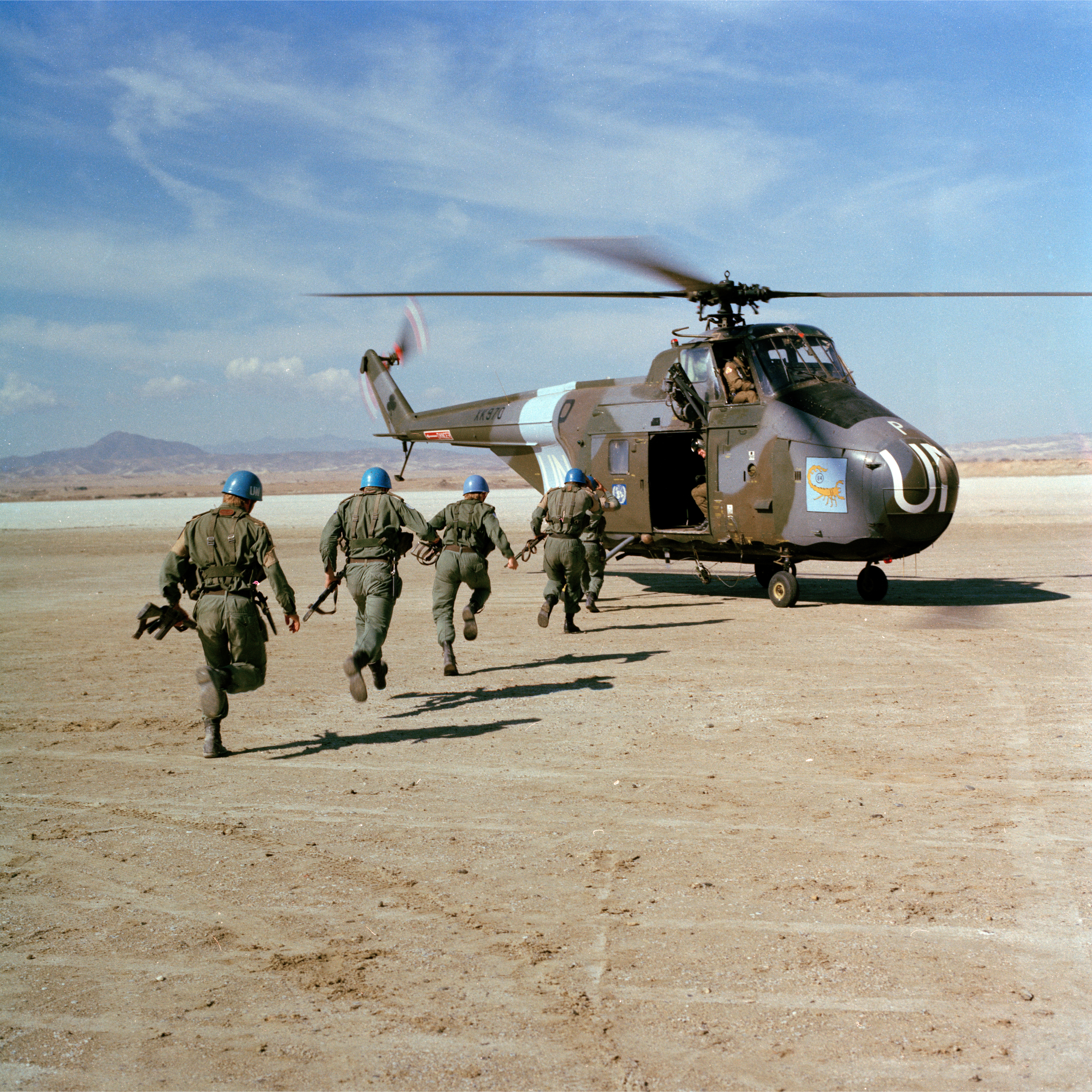
UN troops of UNFICYP boarding an 84 Squadron Whirlwind in 1977

The squadron was reformed on 17 January 1972 from 1563 Flight and a detachment from 230 Squadron with Westland Whirlwind HAR.10s assigned to British Forces Cyprus at RAF Akrotiri, with a detachment at Nicosia International Airport. Duties included support of United Nations Peacekeeping Force in Cyprus (UNFICYP) operations and search and rescue duties for the whole of southern Cyprus. To meet this dual role, the squadron was divided into two flights, with "A" flight, based at Akrotiri for search and rescue duties, with its helicopters painted in overall yellow, and "B" flight for UN support at Nicosia with camouflaged helicopters marked with pale blue bands matching the blue berets of UN peacekeepers, but with no RAF roundels or titles displayed on the B Flight helicopters. After the 1975 Defence Review resulted in the withdrawal of the RAF's fixed-wing squadrons from the Mediterranean, 84 Squadron was the only RAF squadron permanently based in Cyprus, sharing Akrotiri with RAF fighter squadrons visiting the island to attend Armament Practice Camps. The squadron later (December 1981) replaced the Whirlwind with the Westland Wessex HC.2 and later still (June 1984) with the Westland Wessex HU.5C. It was the last squadron to use the Westland Wessex. The Wessex HU.5C was retired during February 1995. The two flights were combined when the squadron shrunk in size to five helicopters after re-equipment with the Wessex, but its helicopters retain aircraft the light blue band around their tail.

No. 84 Squadron was the first RAF contingent into Beirut in the Lebanese Crisis of 1983. This resulted in the evacuation of the peace-keeping element from the city. The responsibility for civil search and rescue duties was eventually transferred to the Cyprus Police Aviation Unit.

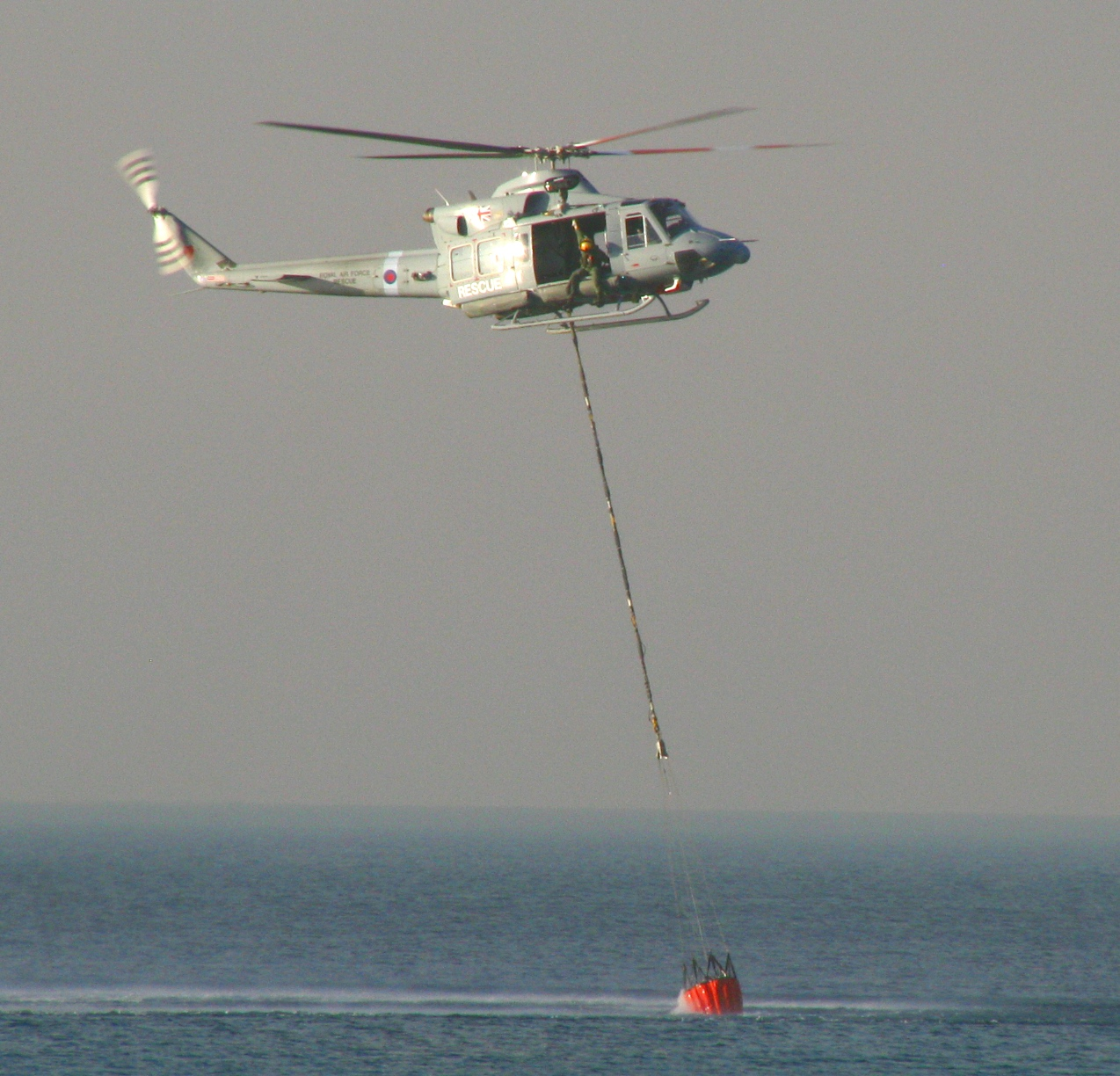
84 Squadron Bell Griffin HAR2 dips its bucket off the coast of Atlit, Israel during the 2010 Mount Carmel forest fire on 3 December 2010

In January 2003 the squadron discarded its Wessexes, replacing them with four contractor owned but military flown Bell Griffin HAR.2 helicopters, with the main duties being search and rescue in support of British forces on Cyprus, also carrying out transport operations for British army units based on the island. On 31 March 2023, the squadron replaced its Griffins with Westland/Airbus Helicopters Puma HC.2s.

The squadron's Puma HC.2s were retired from service in March 2025. The Puma is being replaced by the Jupiter HC2 helicopter as of 2026, though in the interim the Chinook helicopter took over the role.

== Symbols ==
The squadron's badge, approved by George VI in December 1936 is the scorpion, and its motto is Scorpiones pungunt, Latin for "Scorpions sting".

== Aircraft operated ==
According to Jefford, the following is a comprehensive list of aircraft operated by 84 Squadron.

- 1917 Royal Aircraft Factory B.E.12 & BE12a
- 1917 Royal Aircraft Factory B.E.2 & BE2c
- 1917 Nieuport 12
- 1917 Curtiss JN4
- 1917 Avro 504K
- 1917 Sopwith 1½ Strutter
- 1917–1919 Royal Aircraft Factory S.E.5a
- 1920–1929 Airco DH.9A
- 1928–1935 Westland Wapiti
- 1934–1939 Vickers Vincent
- 1939–1941 Bristol Blenheim I
- 1941–1942 Bristol Blenheim IV
- 1942–1945 Vultee Vengeance I, IA, II and III
- 1945–1946 de Havilland Mosquito VI & PR34
- 1946–1948 Bristol Beaufighter X
- 1949–1953 Bristol Brigand B.1
- 1953–1960 Vickers Valetta C.1
- 1956–1957 Bristol Sycamore HR.14
- 1956–1957 Percival Pembroke C.1
- 1958–1967 Blackburn Beverley C.1
- 1967–1970 Hawker Siddeley Andover C.1
- 1972–1982 Westland Whirlwind HAR.10
- 1984-1995 Westland Wessex HU.5C
- 1982–2003 Westland Wessex HC.2 & HAR.2
- 2003–2023 Bell Griffin HAR.2
- 2023–2025 Westland/Airbus Helicopters Puma HC.2
- Since 2026 Jupiter HC2 helicopter

== Notable squadron members ==
- William Sholto Douglas, World War I ace
- Andrew Beauchamp-Proctor, VC, World War I ace
- George Augustus Vaughn, Jr., World War I ace
- Walter Southey, World War I ace
- Carl Frederick Falkenberg, World War I ace
- Robert Grosvenor, World War I ace
- Sidney Highwood, World War I ace
- Hugh Saunders, World War I ace
- John Victor Sorsoleil, World War I ace
- Edwin A. Clear, World War I ace
- Norman Mawle, World War I ace
- Roy Manzer, World War I ace
- John S. Ralston, World War I ace
- Frederick Elliott Brown, World War I ace
- William Henry Brown, World War I ace
- Kenneth Leask, World War I ace
- Percy Hobson, World War I ace
- Cecil Thompson, World War I ace
- Air Marshal George Owen Johnson, World War I ace
- John McCudden, World War I ace
- James Martin Child, World War I ace
