= RAF Henley-on-Thames =

Former RAF base in Berkshire, England

RAF Henley-on-Thames
- Near Wargrave, Berkshire in England

Site information
- Type: Royal Air Force relief landing ground
- Owner: Air Ministry
- Operator: Royal Air Force
- Controlled by: RAF Flying Training Command

Location
- Shown within Berkshire RAF Henley-on-Thames (the United Kingdom)
- Coordinates: 51°32′05″N 000°51′18″W

Site history
- Built: 1939
- In use: 1940 - 1945
- Battles/wars: European theatre of World War II

Airfield information
Runways
Direction	Length and surface
00/00	Grass
00/00	Grass

Royal Air Force Henley-on-Thames or more simply RAF Henley-on-Thames is a former Royal Air Force relief landing ground in Wargrave, Berkshire, England. It was also known by a variety of other names: Cockpole Green, Upper Culham Farm, Crazies Hill, or Crazies Hill Farm.

== History ==
The site was used to assemble and test Supermarine Spitfires (produced locally by dispersed manufacturers in the Reading area), and as a Relief Landing Ground for RAF White Waltham and RAF Woodley. It was built in late 1939 and closed in October 1945. On 18 August 1944 No. 529 Squadron RAF moved to RAF Henley-on-Thames from RAF Halton in Buckinghamshire. This squadron was initially equipped with autogyros but during April 1945 they took delivery of the new American Sikorsky R-4 helicopter (known as the 'Hoverfly I' in British service), RAF Henley-on-Thames becoming the first RAF air base to host an operational helicopter squadron.

The following units were also here at some point:

- Relief Landing Ground for No. 8 Elementary Flying Training School RAF (February 1941 - September 1942)
- Relief Landing Ground for No. 10 Flying Instructors School (Elementary) RAF (July 1944 - May 1946)
- Relief Landing Ground for No. 13 Elementary Flying Training School RAF (July - December 1940)

== Current use ==
As well as agricultural land, there is now a business park at the Upper Culham Farm site, off Culham Lane. There is currently little to indicate on satellite imagery that an airfield once existed here as the runways were grass. The only extant building from the aerodrome is a round defensive pillbox (F.C. Type, Mushroom Type or Oakington Type) in the middle of a field close to Ashley Hill Place, at coordinates 51.5293384 N 0.8524861 W.

== See also ==
- List of former Royal Air Force stations
