= Old Haltonians =

RAF apprentice association

The Old Haltonian Association, which was founded by Lieutenant Colonel AFS Cardwell in 1925, was an important feature of the earliest years of the Royal Air Force's apprentice training at the No. 1 School of Technical Training. The objects of the Old Haltonian Association were to stimulate interest and comradeship between all ex-Halton apprentices, to provide information on the progress and activities of ex-apprentices for those still under training and to give each aircraft apprentice at Halton an insight into the functions of service units. It was a flourishing activity with representatives on every RAF unit and in the aircraft industry who all submitted reports to the association's Halton Magazine on the doings of ex-apprentices worldwide.

== RAF Aircraft Apprentice Scheme ==
The RAF Aircraft Apprentice Scheme was initiated by Lord Trenchard at the No. 1 School of Technical Training, which had moved to RAF Halton by 1922. Initially started in 1920 at Halton camp, the site was not ready to accept apprentices until 1922 so the first 4 Entries were trained at 'RAF Cranwell'. Between 1922 and 1993, when the scheme ended with 155th Entry, over 40,000 young men known, more or less affectionately as Halton 'Brats' had graduated. Richie Waylens (155th) is officially the last apprentice to graduate from the apprentice scheme.

== Old Haltonian revival ==
The modern era of ex-Apprentice activity built up again during the 1970s having rather fallen away in the previous decade. A Golden Jubilee Reunion was held at Halton on 1 August 1970, organised by the station under the then Commandant, Air Commodore Bob Weighill, and it is famous for the first appearance of what became the Golden Oldies when ex-band members "borrowed" the existing Halton band's instruments and put on a dazzling display. Then, in 1977, Charles Kimber (18th Entry) brought out his book, "Son of Halton" which undoubtedly aroused the interest of ex-Apprentices and Kimber became part of a group led by Douglas Henning (37th Entry) who organised a Reunion at Halton, including a Dinner for nearly 180 people, on 7 October 1978, but which was limited to members of Entries up to the 51st.

The following year, Douglas Henning and his team organised a Diamond Jubilee Reunion which took place on 27 September 1980. It was strongly supported by the Station under the leadership of Group Captain Owen Truelove and was a huge success with an estimated 3,500 attending and it set the pattern for all future Reunions. During that day, the RAF Halton Aircraft Apprentices Association was formed at an inaugural meeting under the Chairmanship of Douglas Henning. A Constitution was adopted and Group Captain Truelove became the first ex-officio President of the Association, a position that all succeeding Station Commanders have accepted to this day.

== Halton magazine ==
Several articles had been submitted for a Reunion souvenir which, alas, did not materialise but this stimulated the idea on the Station of reviving the Halton Magazine, dead now for nearly a decade. The Association keenly supported the production of a magazine, and the first Haltonian was finally published in the summer of 1981 and included a report on the visit of Her Majesty The Queen to Halton the previous year. This prototype Haltonian was seen both as a means of communicating with the ex-Apprentice community as well as being a Station magazine, and the Association distributed copies to all its Members. However, in its glossy A4 format, it always struggled financially and in the autumn of 1985, Bill Kelley (55th), who had previously co-ordinated ex-Apprentice input, took over the Haltonian as Editor for the Association and it was produced bi-annually in A5 format under Bill's outstandingly successful leadership until July 2010. The editor's role passed to Stuart Morgan, who joined as a craft apprentice of 202nd entry in January 1965. Stuart held the editor's role for two years until the end of July 2012. Currently, the Old Haltonian is edited by Barry Hathaway of the 100th Entry.

== Organisation ==
The first Annual General Meeting of the RAF Halton Apprentices Association (Old Haltonians) was held on 19 October 1981. It was attended by over 125 Members, including the Association's Patron, Air Vice Marshal Michael Armitage (56th) and the newly appointed president, one Group Captain Mike Evans (70th), who had taken over as Station Commander three weeks before. One of the major items of the first AGM was a resolution passed to support a campaign that had been mounted to re-instate the Apprentice "wheel" badge. The right to wear the "wheel" had been lost under the 1974 revision of the arrangements for the treatment of young airmen and apprentices under training. The campaign resulted in the reinstatement of the "wheel" in time for the Graduation of the 134th Entry in September 1982. Another major item was the recommendation that further Reunions should be held at three-year intervals with the first Triennial Reunion held in 1983.

When Group Captain Evans tour ended in November 1983, he observed the appropriate formal break from involvement in the business of the council until in late 1985, Douglas Henning died suddenly, and he was invited to become Chairman of the Association, a post that Group Captain Mike Evans (70th entry) filled for 12 years until 1998.

During the first five years of the Association, the basic financial and management structure evolved, with the investment of Annual, 3-yearly and Life Membership subscriptions to ensure an income stream to fund the administration, laying down the organisational framework for Triennial Reunions, use of a very early – almost steam – computer to handle Membership records, ensuring that the Haltonian magazine was funded and distributed, coordinating the formation of Area and Entry branches which have formed the heart of the everyday activities of the ex-Apprentice community up to this day, and establishing a focus for welfare activities with the appointment of a Welfare Co-ordinator. Last but not least, a warm relationship with the Station, without whose support, it would have been impossible to operate, was developed until early 2020. The impending closure of RAF Halton combined with inappropriate activities by senior members of the Association caused the Station to withdraw its support.

Even at the first AGM, there was an appreciation of the financial advantages that would accrue from charitable status and work was started to enable the Association to negotiate with the Charities Commission. The professional input to this work was made by Eric Moss-Wright, Chartered Accountant, our Financial Adviser, and resulted in the much amended Second Issue of the Constitution which was adopted at the AGM of 1985 with the Objects of the Association amended to include the relief of need, hardship or distress amongst Members and their dependents. The award of Charity status was a major milestone in the life of the Association.

== Members ==
The oldest living member of the RAF Halton Apprentices Association (Old Haltonians) is John Rogers, who was born in October 1908, and who became a member of the 12th entry of apprentices in 1925. The oldest living member of the Association is awarded the honorary title "King Brat" as a mark of respect. John Rogers succeeded Richard Martin (6th entry, 1922) (Born: 12 October 1906, in Southfields, London/Died: 1 November 2010, in Kircaldy, Fife, aged 104) as King Brat.

The Patron of the "Old Haltonians" Association is Air Chief Marshal Sir Michael Armitage (56th entry, Aircraft Apprentices) and the Vice-Patrons are Air Marshal Cliff Spink (104th entry, Aircraft Apprentices) and Air Marshal Sir "Dusty" Graham Miller (RAF officer) (210th entry, Craft Apprentices).

== Activities ==
Today the Association is still active. Old Haltonians meet with their entry colleagues and the Association runs a members only Triennial reunion. The last one being held in September 2016 at RAF Halton. The Halton Grove at the National Memorial Arboretum at Alrewas in Staffordshire commemorates the Old Haltonians. The Haltonian magazine is published twice a year and sent out only to members of the Old Haltonians association. Old Haltonians have their own web site.

== Old Haltonian social network ==
A secure social network site exclusively for ex-apprentices and former members of the Directing Staff of the apprentice schools can be accessed at Old Haltonians social networking web site. A small subscription is payable for access to this site, which was created by and is managed by Stuart Morgan (202nd craft apprentice entry), independently of the RAF Halton Apprentices Association (Old Haltonians).

== Contact ==
The Old Haltonians Association can be contacted through the Secretary as detailed on the web site. It is no longer based at RAF Halton. Membership of the Old Haltonians Association ha costs which vary.
