= Martin Widdowson =

Royal Air Force officer

Martin Keith Widdowson
- Born: 10 May 1946 (age 80)
- Military career
- Allegiance: United Kingdom
- Branch: Royal Air Force
- Service years: 1964–96
- Rank: Air Commodore
- Service number: 4232200
- Commands: Royal Observer Corps; RAF Coningsby; No. 23 Squadron

Air Commodore Martin Keith Widdowson (born 10 May 1946) was a senior Royal Air Force officer in the 1980s and 1990s and the 24th and last Commandant Royal Observer Corps.

== Military career ==
Widdowson was commissioned into the Royal Air Force on 25 March 1964, as an acting pilot officer. A year later, on 25 March 1965, he was regraded as a pilot officer. A year after that, on 25 March 1966, he was promoted to flying officer, and he was appointed to a permanent commission on 1 October 1968. He was promoted to flight lieutenant on 25 September 1969. On 1 January 1974, he was promoted to squadron leader. He was promoted to wing commander on 1 July 1981.

His final operational flying appointment was as the Officer Commanding No. 23 Squadron in 1982 and by the late 1980s, he was Station Commander of RAF Coningsby. He was promoted from wing commander to group captain on 1 January 1988. On 1 July 1992, he was promoted to air commodore and in 1995 he was appointed as Senior Air Staff Officer (SASO) of No. 11/18 Group RAF, simultaneously holding the appointment of 24th and last Commandant Royal Observer Corps until the ROC was Stood Down. He retired from the RAF on 14 September 1996.

Military offices
Preceded by Christopher Coville	Station Commander RAF Coningsby c. 1988–1990	Succeeded by Cliff Spink
Preceded by Cliff Spink	Commandant Royal Observer Corps; 1993–1996	Corps stood down
