= Defence Growth Partnership =

The Defence Growth Partnership (DGP) is a partnership between the UK Government and the British defence industry. It is jointly led by the Department for Business, Energy and Industrial Strategy and the Defence Industry, with "the support of the Ministry of Defence as the UK customer". It was endorsed by the then Prime Minister, David Cameron and is currently co-chaired by Allan Cook CBE, and the Minister for Business, Energy and Industrial Strategy, Richard Harrington (politician). The DGP was first announced at Farnborough Airshow in 2012.

== Centre For Maritime Intelligent Systems ==
As part of the DGP initiative a Centre for Maritime Intelligent Systems (CMIS) was announced in July 2014. CMIS is a £4m defence research centre, based at the Portsdown Technology Park in Portsmouth. The centre was officially opened on 17 November 2014 by Matthew Hancock, MP

== Defence Solutions Centre ==
As part of the DGP a UK Defence Solutions Centre was opened in Farnborough in 2015. Its current CEO is Mark Barclay, with independent Chairman Brian Burridge.
