= Murder of Rita Ellis =

Murder victim

Rita Irene Ellis
- Born: 10 October 1948; Stevenage
- Died: c. 11 November 1967 (aged 19); RAF Halton camp
- Occupation: Women's Royal Air Force

Rita Ellis was a 19-year-old Women's Royal Air Force (WRAF) (Note: The Women's Royal Air Force (WRAF) was a separate entity from the Royal Air Force (RAF), but the WRAF was disbanded in 1994 and subsumed into the RAF.) servicewoman who was serving at RAF Halton, Buckinghamshire, England, when she was murdered on 11 November 1967. Ellis' murder has remained unsolved after 50 years despite periodic cold case inquiries and the availability of the offender's DNA sample, which has been tested against 200 men.

== History ==
Ellis, who grew up in Stevenage, joined the WRAF on 28 April 1967 and accomplished her basic training at RAF Spitalgate in Grantham, Lincolnshire. At the time of her murder, Ellis was working in the kitchens of the Princess Marys Royal Air Force Hospital catering department on the camp at RAF Halton in Buckinghamshire.

On the night of 11 November 1967, Ellis was due to babysit for Wing Commander Roy Watson and his wife. Steve Tank, an RAF apprentice, and his nurse girlfriend, Liz, escorted Ellis to the front of the WRAF women's housing block at 7.25pm leaving her there, to go on their date. Wing Commander Watson arrived at the block at 7:40 pm to pick Ellis up, but she was not there. He waited for 15 minutes before leaving and coming back 10 minutes later with his wife, who could, under the RAF rules of the time, enter the all-female block. Ellis was not in the block. It was reported some time later that the police believed Ellis, described by an acquaintance as "a gentle soul", may have gotten into the perpetrator's car, as she had never met Wing Commander Watson before and may have been too shy to question the driver's identity.

Ellis was last seen alive at 8:00 pm on 11 November, but as there were two public functions on at the camp that night (disco and bingo), there were hundreds of civilians and military personnel on the base.

Ellis's body was found by a dogwalker the next day, on 12 November, in Rowborough Copse, a piece of woodland on the western edge of the camp where a disused railway line used to bring supplies into the camp. She had been beaten, sexually assaulted, and strangled with her own underwear. An effort had been made to hide her half-naked body under foliage. Police did question a local scrap dealer about the murder, but no charges were ever brought, as his DNA profiling did not match.

== Cold case ==
External videos
- YouTube videos
- In the Footsteps of Killlers Series 1 Episode 3

On the 40th anniversary of Ellis' death, a cold case inquiry was launched by Thames Valley Police as part of a greater investigation into unsolved crimes going back over 50 years. The detective superintendent in charge of the case appealed for witnesses to come forward.

In 2012, police were also looking at an attack on a student nurse in Little Tring that at the time was tentatively linked to Ellis's death. The woman was raped and hit over the head with a blunt instrument, and police believed the attacker left her for dead, but, miraculously, she survived. The attack occurred only three miles (4.8 km) away from where Ellis was found murdered and whilst there were no definitive links, certain characteristics were very similar.

In November 2017, Thames Valley Police again announced that they were looking at the case. This time, however, they had a DNA sample which had been tested against 200 men, as well as the national DNA database. DNA analysis indicated that the sample belonged to a male and whilst the family of Ellis remained hopeful, they acknowledged that the perpetrator could be dead, as his age was assumed to be between his late sixties and early eighties. In late 2020, the Thames Valley Police's major crime review team issued a further appeal for anyone with information to come forward.

In June 2021, for the television series In The Footsteps of Killers, Professor David Wilson and presenter Emilia Fox interviewed Ellis's contemporaries and Wilson theorised that Ellis may have known her killer.

The reports, correspondence, and statements about the case are sealed in The National Archives but centrally held by the MOD under section 3.4 (National Security) with a prospective opening date on 1 January 2070.

In April 2023, it was proposed that Ellis may have been a victim of Bible John.
