= School of Military Aeronautics =

School of Military Aeronautics may refer to:

- No 1 School of Military Aeronautics
- United States School of Military Aeronautics at the University of Illinois at Urbana–Champaign
- School of Military Aeronautics at Cornell University
- School of Military Aeronautics at University of California, Berkeley
- School of Military Aeronautics at Princeton University
