= R M Groves =

R M Groves may refer to:

- Robert Groves, Director of the United States Census Bureau
- Robert Marsland Groves, Royal Navy and Royal Air Force officer
