= Norman MacEwen =

Royal Air Force air vice marshal (1881–1953)

Sir Norman MacEwen
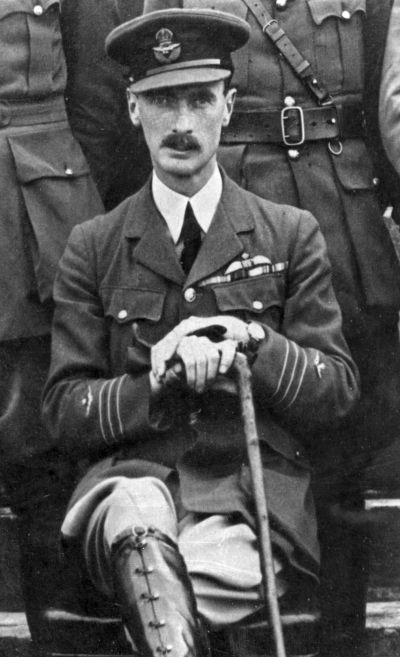
- Lieutenant Colonel MacEwen
- Born: 8 November 1881
- Died: 29 January 1953 (aged 71)
- Military career
- Allegiance: United Kingdom
- Branch: British Army; Royal Air Force
- Service years: 1900–1935; 1939–1940
- Rank: Air Vice Marshal
- Commands: No. 22 Group (1929–1931, 1939–1940); No. 1 School of Technical Training (1931–1935); RAF Transjordan (1923–1926); Central Flying School (1920–1922)
- Conflicts: Second Boer War; First World War; Second World War
- Awards: Knight Bachelor; Companion of the Order of the Bath; Companion of the Order of St Michael and St George; Distinguished Service Order
- Other work: Chairman of the Soldiers', Sailors' and Airmen's Families Association

Air Vice Marshal Sir Norman Duckworth Kerr MacEwen, CB, CMG, DSO (8 November 1881 – 29 January 1953) was a senior commander in the Royal Air Force during the first half of the 20th century.

== Army career ==
In 1901, following officer training at the Royal Military College, Sandhurst, MacEwen was commissioned into the Argyll and Sutherland Highlanders. As a junior officer he saw service in South Africa in the early years of the 20th century. In August 1915 he was appointed as Aide-de-camp to the General Officer Commanding Southern Command. At some stage in either the second half of 1915 or the early months of 1916, MacEwan went on to take up duties in the Royal Flying Corps. He was promoted major in January 1916 and, following flying duties, on 16 August 1916 was he promoted to lieutenant colonel and appointed Deputy Assistant Director of Aeronautics. MacEwen spent the remainder of the First World War in staff and administrative appointments. On 1 April 1918, like other members of the Royal Flying Corps, MacEwen transferred to the RAF on its establishment.

== RAF career ==
After the end of the First World War, MacEwen was posted out to Afghanistan. On 13 December 1918, he was a passenger on the first through flight from Great Britain to Egypt. MacEwen arrived in Cairo on 1 January 1919 from where he travelled on to Afghanistan. Later in 1919 he took up the post of Officer Commanding RAF India.

In 1920 MacEwen returned to Great Britain. He was first appointed Commandant of the Flying Instructors School and then Commandant of the Central Flying School. From 1923 to 1926 MacEwen occupied the post of Officer Commanding RAF Transjordan. In 1926 he was appointed deputy director of Training and in 1929 he was first promoted air commodore and then appointed as Air Officer Commanding (AOC) No. 22 Group. In 1931 MacEwen was posted to the double-hatted appointment of AOC RAF Halton and Commandant No. 1 School of Technical Training. On 1 January 1932 MacEwen was promoted to air vice marshal. He retired in 1935 at his own request. In 1939, with war looming, MacEwen was recalled to service. He served as AOC No. 22 Group once again, retiring for the second time in 1940. From 1941 to 1943 as a retired officer, MacEwen was a Regional Air Liaison Officer.

From 1936 to 1949, MacEwen was Chairman of the Soldiers', Sailors' and Airmen's Families Association.

Norman MacEwen died on 29 January 1953 at the RAF Hospital Uxbridge.

Military offices
Preceded by Charles Breese	Commandant of the Flying Instructors School; Post retitled Commandant of the Central Flying School on 26 April 1920; 1920–1922	Succeeded by Edward Masterman
Preceded by Robert Gordon	Officer Commanding RAF Trans-Jordania; Post retitled Officer Commanding RAF Transjordan in 1925; 1923–1926	Unknown
Preceded by Duncan Pitcher	Air Officer Commanding No. 22 Group; 1929–1931	Succeeded by Henry Brock
Preceded by Ian Bonham-Carter	Commandant, No. 1 School of Technical Training; 1931–1934	Succeeded by John Tremayne Babington
Preceded by Charles Blount	Air Officer Commanding No. 22 Group; 1939–1940	Succeeded by Charles Blount
