= Oliver Swann =

British military commander

Air Vice-Marshal Sir Oliver Swann KCB CBE
- Born: 18 November 1878; Wimbledon, London
- Died: 7 March 1948 (aged 69); Littleton, Guildford
- Military career
- Allegiance: United Kingdom
- Branch: Royal Navy (1895–1918); Royal Air Force (1918–1940)
- Service years: 1895–1929; 1939–1940
- Rank: Air Vice-Marshal
- Commands: No. 1 School of Technical Training (1939–40); RAF Halton (1939–40); RAF Middle East (1923–1926); Air Member for Personnel (1922–23); Egyptian RAF Group (1920–21); Mediterranean RAF Group (1919–20); Orkneys Division (1917–18); HMS Campania (1915–1917); HMS Niger (1910)
- Conflicts: First World War; Second World War
- Awards: Knight Commander of the Order of the Bath; Commander of the Order of the British Empire

Air Vice-Marshal Sir Oliver Swann, KCB, CBE (born Schwann; 18 November 1878 – 7 March 1948) was a British military commander who was a leading figure in the Royal Naval Air Service and senior commander in the Royal Air Force during the first half of the 20th century.

== Early years ==
Schwann joined the Royal Navy in 1892, and was a lieutenant when in July 1902 he was posted as junior staff to HMS Vernon, naval torpedo school ship at Chatham dockyard. In February 1903 he was posted to HMS Ocean, serving on the China Station, and lent temporary to HMS Spartiate for the voyage out.

== Early naval aviation ==
In 1910 Schwann was selected to assist Captain Murray Sueter who was conducting pioneering naval aviation work with airships. Later, Schwann bought an Avro Type D landplane (at his own expense with support from friends) for £700 and fitted floats to it. Despite not having qualified as a pilot, Schwann managed to fly it off the water. Although Schwann crashed the aircraft, this was the first aircraft take off by a British pilot from salt water.

In November 1912, after Schwann had qualified as a pilot, he was appointed assistant director of the Air Department at the Admiralty, making him deputy to Murray Sueter. Over the next two years Sueter and Schwann worked to establish the Royal Naval Air Service.

== First World War ==
In 1914, just prior to the outbreak of the First World War, Schwann was promoted to captain and assigned to port duties. The following year he was appointed captain of the aircraft carrier HMS Campania, a former Cunard liner that had been converted to carry a dozen aircraft. Later in the war, Schwann served as Officer Commanding the Orkneys Division. In 1917 Oliver Schwann anglicized the spelling of his name to Swann. With the establishment of the Royal Air Force in early 1918, Swann was transferred to the new service. He served as Deputy Chief of the Air Staff during the last months of the war and into 1919.

== Inter-war years ==
In April 1919 Swann was appointed Air Officer Commanding the Mediterranean District and the following year his command was redesignated as the Mediterranean Group. On 1 June 1920, Swann was posted to become Air Officer Commanding Egyptian Group. On his return to Great Britain in early 1923, Swann became Director of Personnel. Later that year his post was retitled Air Member for Personnel when Swann became a member of the Air Council with responsibility for personnel matters. Swann did not spend long at home. On 27 November 1923 Swann was appointed Air Officer Commanding RAF Middle East. He held this post until late 1926 and he retired from the RAF in 1929.

== Second World War ==
During the Second World War, Swann was recalled to service as the Commandant of No. 1 School of Technical Training at RAF Halton. He retired from the RAF for the second time in July 1940 and afterwards worked as the Air Liaison Officer for the North Midland Region. Swann died only three years after the end of the Second World War on 7 March 1948 at his home in Littleton, Guildford.

Military offices
Preceded by Robert Groves	Deputy Chief of the Air Staff; 1918–1919	Succeeded by Robert Groves
New title Formation established	AOC Mediterranean District; AOC Mediterranean Group from 1 April 1920; 1919–1920	Succeeded by Eugene Gerrard
Preceded by Robert Groves	Air Officer Commanding Egyptian Group; 1920–1921	Succeeded by Bertie Drew
Preceded by Unknown	Director of Personnel; Post retitled Air Member for Personnel in 1923; 1922–1923	Succeeded by Sir Philip Game
Preceded by Edward Ellington	Air Officer Commanding RAF Middle East; 1923–1926	Succeeded by Tom Webb-Bowen
Preceded by George Dacre	Commandant, No. 1 School of Technical Training; 1939–1940	Succeeded by George Dacre
