= Cliff Spink =

Royal Air Force Air Marshal (born 1946)

Clifford Rodney Spink CB CBE FCMI FRAeS
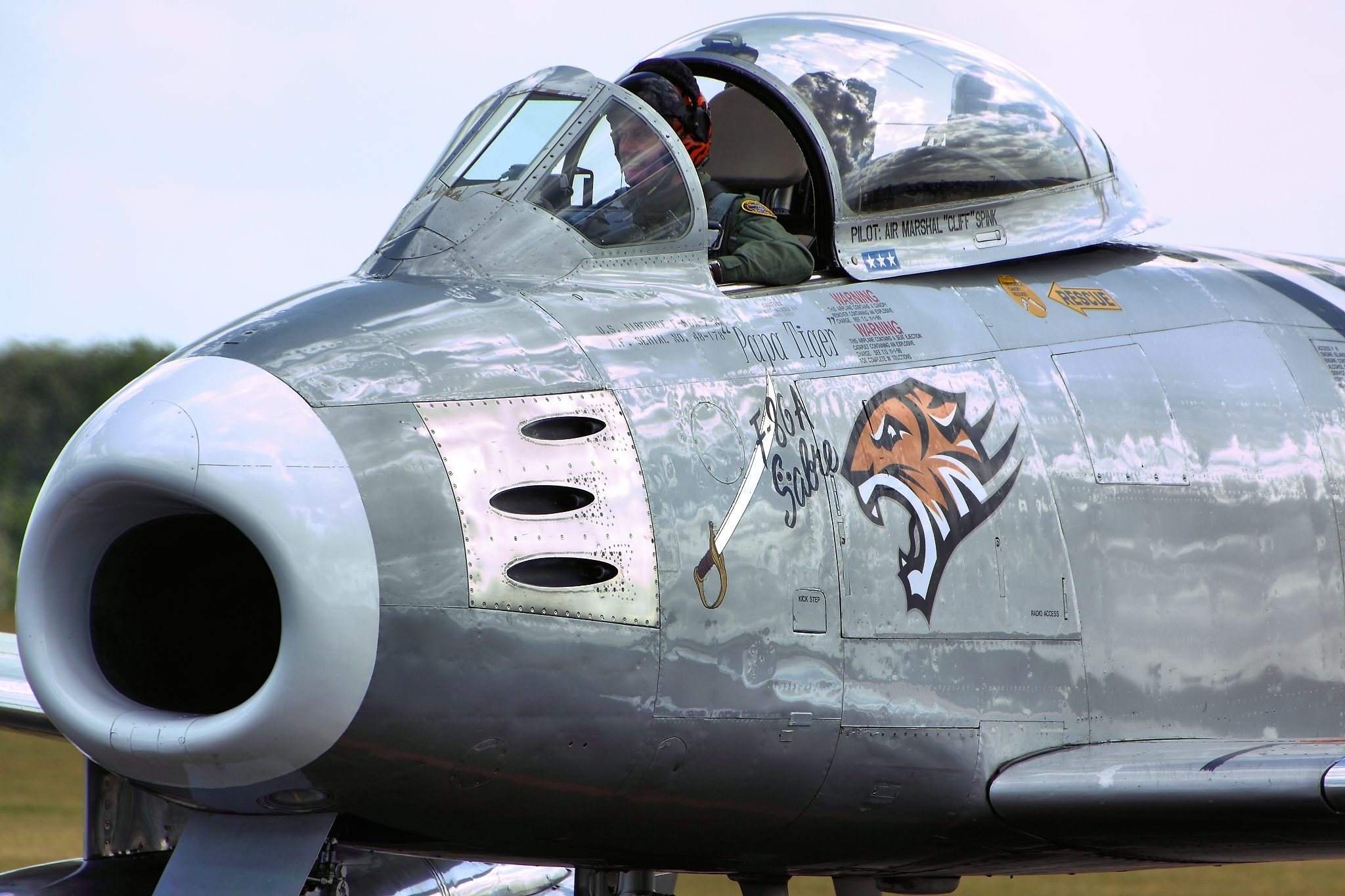
- Spink piloting an F-86A
- Born: 17 May 1946 (age 80)
- Military career
- Allegiance: United Kingdom
- Branch: Royal Air Force
- Rank: Air Marshal
- Commands: No. 11/18 Group; Royal Observer Corps; RAF Mount Pleasant; RAF Coningsby; No. 74 Squadron
- Conflicts: Gulf War
- Awards: Companion of the Order of the Bath; Commander of the Order of the British Empire
- Other work: President Historic Aircraft Association; Honorary President Royal Observer Corps Association; Vice-Patron RAF Halton Apprentices Association (Old Haltonians)

Clifford Rodney Spink (born 17 May 1946) is a retired senior Royal Air Force officer, who is now a Spitfire display pilot on the national air display circuit. The first Spitfire he ever flew belonged to the Battle of Britain Memorial Flight, during his tenure as Station Commander of RAF Coningsby. He also served as the 23rd Commandant of the Royal Observer Corps, the last but one officer to hold the post.

== Royal Air Force career ==
Spink joined the Royal Air Force in the spring of 1963 with the 104th entry of the Aircraft Apprentice Scheme at No. 1 School of Technical Training, RAF Halton. On passing out of Halton, in the spring of 1966, in the rank of Sgt Aircraft Apprentice, he was granted a flying commission at the RAF College Cranwell, and initially learned to fly on the Jet Provost. Later training took place on the Gnat and the Hunter, before Spink was posted to his first frontline tour on No. 111 Squadron flying the Lightning. Spink was later posted to No. 56 Squadron in Cyprus before returning to No. 111 Squadron.

Spink served as the Commanding Officer of No. 74 Squadron before being posted to the South Atlantic in 1989 as the Officer Commanding RAF Mount Pleasant on the British Overseas Territory of the Falkland Islands. In 1990 Spink underwent conversion training to the Tornado before becoming Station Commander at RAF Coningsby. In 1991 Spink served as the RAF's Tornado Detachment Commander during the first Gulf War. After attending the Royal College of Defence Studies, he became Senior Air Staff Officer of No. 11 Group in March 1993, Chief of Staff of No. 18 Group in 1995 and Air Officer Commanding No. 11/18 Group in 1996.

Spink also served as the last but one Commandant of the Royal Observer Corps, from 1993 until 1995. Spink remains the honorary President of the Royal Observer Corps Association. He is a Vice-Patron of the Royal Air Force Halton Apprentices Association Old Haltonians.

== Since the RAF ==
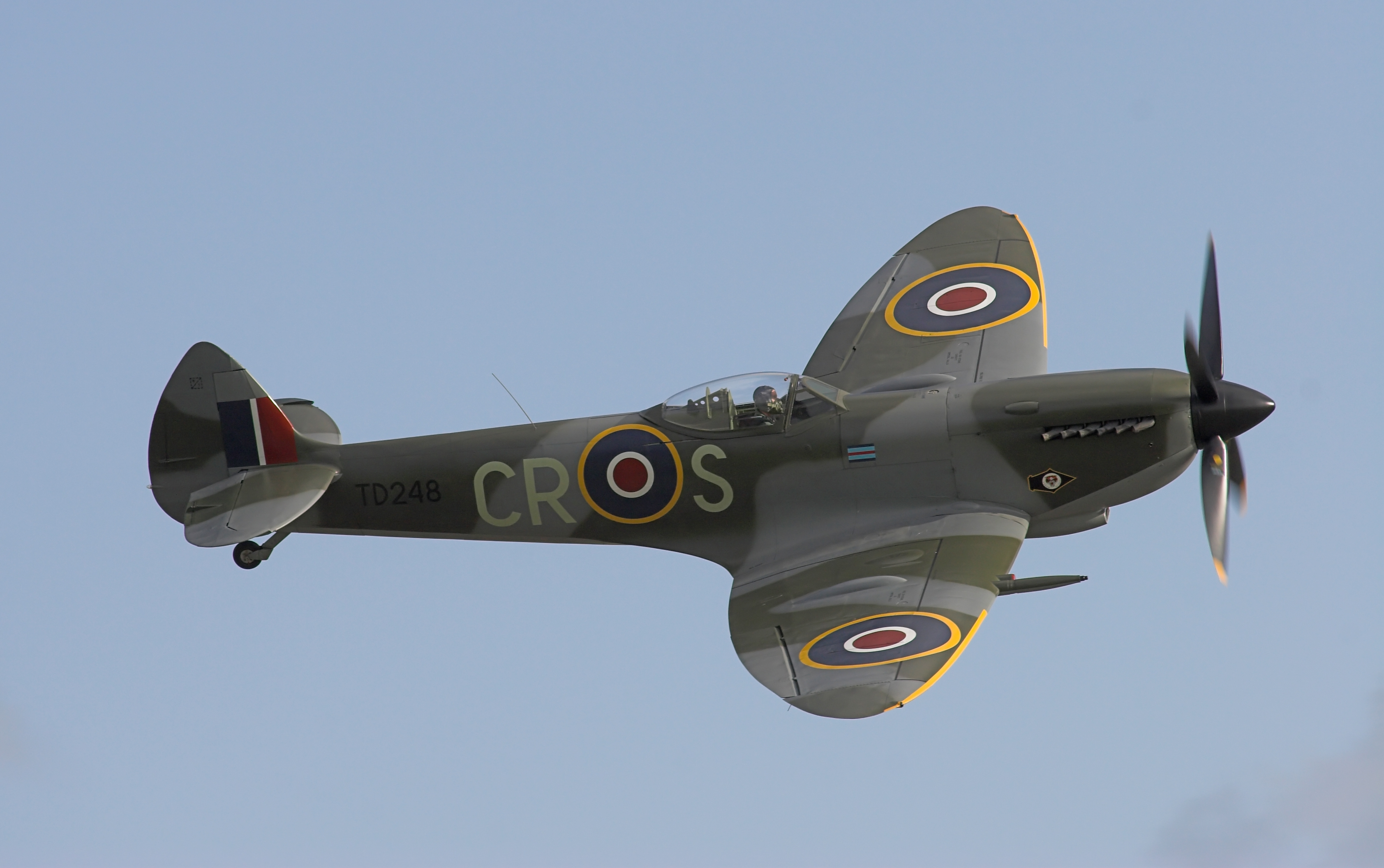
TD248 carries the codes 'CR-S' and the Tiger and motto of No. 74 Squadron RAF

Spink currently flies a restored Spitfire XVIe TD248. This is a former "gate guardian" from RAF Sealand which was rebuilt by Historic Flying Limited about 15 years ago. It initially appeared in a postwar No. 41 Squadron colour scheme but it has recently been repainted in wartime colours with the personal markings 'CR-S'. Since retiring from the RAF he has formed his own Company, "Spitfire Limited", dealing in a range of aviation interests.

Military offices
Preceded by Michael Donaldson	Commandant Royal Observer Corps; 1993–1995	Succeeded by Martin Widdowson
New title Group formed on merger of No. 11 Group and No. 18 Group	Air Officer Commanding No. 11/18 Group; 1996–1998	Succeeded by Brian Burridge
Other offices
Preceded by Owen Epton	Master of the Guild of Air Pilots and Air Navigators; 2012–13	Succeeded by Tudor Owen
