= Ian Bonham-Carter =

Royal Air Force Air Commodore (1882-1953)

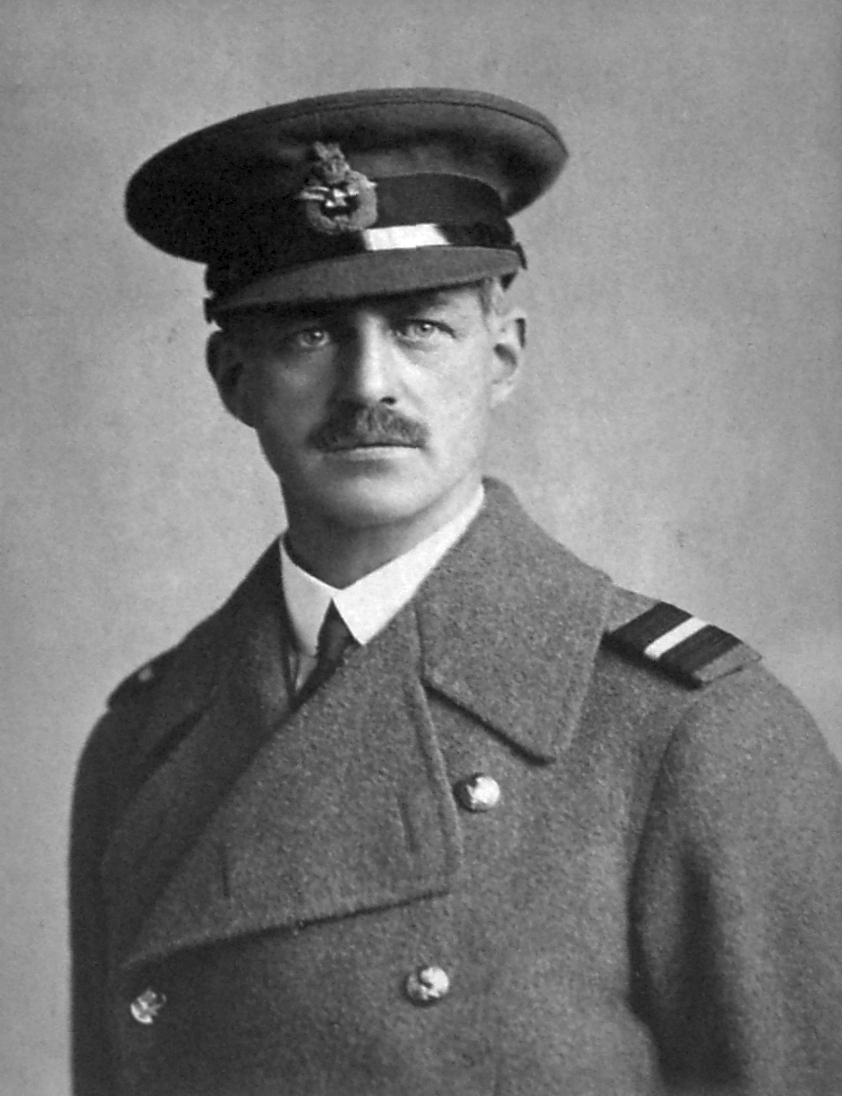
- Air Commodore Bonham-Carter
- Born: 31 July 1882; Westminster, London
- Died: 31 December 1953 (aged 71); Halton, Buckinghamshire
- Military career
- Allegiance: United Kingdom
- Branch: British Army (1900–18); Royal Air Force (1918–42)
- Service years: 1900–1931; 1939–1942
- Rank: Air Commodore
- Commands: No. 1 School of Technical Training (1928–31); No. 23 Group RAF (1926–28); No. 3 Group RAF (1925–26); RAF Ireland (1922); No. 11 Wing RAF (1920–22); No. 11 Group RAF (1920); No. 1 School of Military Aeronautics (1916–17)
- Conflicts: Second Boer War; World War I World War II
- Awards: Companion of the Order of the Bath; Officer of the Order of the British Empire; Mentioned in Despatches (3); Commander of the Legion of Honour (France); Order of Saint Stanislaus, 2nd Class with Swords (Russia)

Air Commodore Ian Malcolm Bonham-Carter, CB, OBE (31 July 1882 – 31 December 1953) was a senior officer in the Royal Air Force and member of the prominent Bonham-Carter family.

== Biography ==
Bonham-Carter was the second son of Hugh Bonham-Carter, younger son of John Bonham-Carter, and Jane Margaret Macdonald.

After his education at Haileybury, Bonham-Carter was commissioned into the Northumberland Fusiliers in 1900. He served in the 5th Battalion and then the 1st Battalion of the Northumberland Fusiliers before being appointed adjutant in 1909. In May 1914 he attended No. 6 Course at the Central Flying School, receiving his Aviator's Certificate no. 794 on 25 May. After completing his flying training, Bonham-Carter served in the Royal Flying Corps until he transferred to the Royal Air Force (RAF) on its creation in 1918.

In February 1922 Royal Air Force Ireland was reformed under the command of Group Captain Bonham-Carter. The life of this command was short, disbanding in 1923.

In 1925, Bonham-Carter was appointed Air Officer Commanding No. 3 Group and in 1926 he took up command of No. 23 Group. He was then posted in 1928 as Commandant of No. 1 School of Technical Training.

During the Second World War, Bonham-Carter served as Duty Air Commodore in the Operations Room of Headquarters RAF Fighter Command.

Military offices
Unknown	Officer Commanding No. 11 Group; 9 February – 25 April 1920	Succeeded by Post disestablished Next held by Philip Joubert de la Ferté in 1936
Preceded by Robert Gordon	Air Officer Commanding No. 3 Group; 1925–1926	Succeeded by Post disestablished Next held by Patrick Playfair in 1936
Preceded by Charles Laverock Lambe	Commandant, No. 1 School of Technical Training; 1 April 1928 – 30 September 1931	Succeeded by Norman MacEwen
