= No. 1 School of Technical Training RAF =

No.1 School of Technical Training
- School badge
- Active: 1919–present
- Country: United Kingdom
- Branch: Royal Air Force
- Type: Defence training school
- Role: Aircraft engineering training
- Size: c. 2,000 students annually
- Part of: Defence School of Aeronautical Engineering
- Station: RAF Cosford
- Mottos: Crescentes Discimus (Latin for 'Growing we learn')

No. 1 School of Technical Training (No. 1 S of TT) is the Royal Air Force's aircraft engineering school. It was based at RAF Halton from 1919 to 1993, as the Home of the Aircraft Apprentice scheme. The Aircraft Apprentice scheme trained young men in the mechanical trades for aircraft maintenance, the graduates of which were the best trained technicians in the RAF and would usually progress to Senior NCO ranks. However, ninety one ex-apprentices went on to achieve Air Rank. Many more became commissioned officers, including Sir Frank Whittle "father of the jet engine", who completed his apprenticeship at RAF Cranwell, before the move to RAF Halton. Graduates of the Aircraft Apprentice scheme at RAF Halton are known as Old Haltonians.

== History ==
As well as the three-year apprentice scheme No.1 S of TT also carried out training of Craft Apprentices on a newly developed two-year long apprenticeship, from 1964, commencing with 201 entry. Sgt Craft Apprentice Glenn Morton of 203 entry was the first craft apprentice to receive a direct entry commission after graduating from Halton. The immediate past senior serving member of the RAF Halton Apprentices Association (Old Haltonians) is Air Vice-Marshal Paul Colley OBE, who joined the RAF as an apprentice of 127th entry. The oldest living member of the association is awarded the honorary title "King Brat" as a mark of respect.

The Patron of the "Old Haltonians" Association is Air Chief Marshal Mike Armitage (56th entry, Aircraft Apprentices) and the Vice-Patrons are Air Marshal Cliff Spink (104th entry, Aircraft Apprentices) and Air Marshal Sir Graham Miller (RAF officer) (210th entry, Craft Apprentices).

The RAF Aircraft Apprentice Scheme was initiated by Lord Trenchard at the No.1 School of Technical Training, RAF Halton in 1922. Initially started in 1920 at Halton camp, the site was not ready to accept apprentices until 1922 so the first four entries were trained at 'RAF Cranwell'. Between 1922 and 1993, when the scheme ended with 155th Entry, over 40,000 young men known, more or less affectionately as Halton 'Brats' (or Trenchard's Brats) had graduated. Richie Waylens (155th) is officially the last apprentice to graduate from the apprentice scheme at Cosford in 1993.

In July 1952, No.1 S of TT received royal recognition when Her Majesty Queen Elizabeth II presented the School with a colour. The colour was received on behalf of the school by the 63rd Entry of aircraft apprentices; the colour party being Sergeant Aircraft Apprentice (S/A/A) F.M. Hines, and identical twins S/A/A's Clive and Richard Grant. The Colour is unique among those awarded to United Kingdom forces in that it is paraded by non-commissioned personnel. This is a tradition inaugurated by the Queen when she presented the original Colour in 1952.

From 1993 to the present No.1 S of TT has been based at the Defence College of Aeronautical Engineering, Cosford.

== Heritage ==
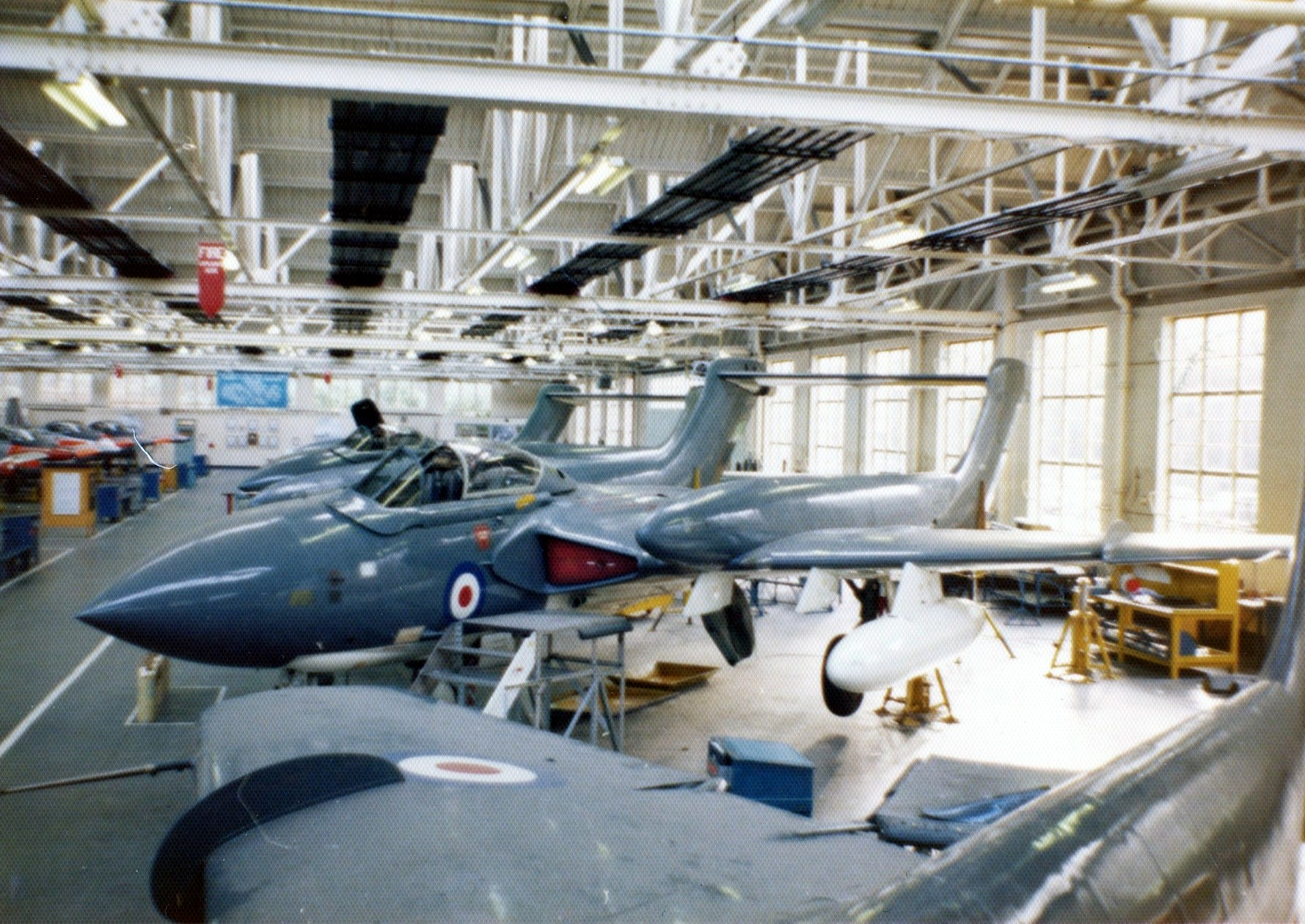
Inside the New Workshops of No.1 SofTT at RAF Halton during the 1970s

The school's heraldic badge features a beech tree bearing fruit on a grassy mount. It was approved in June 1939 and refers to RAF Halton, where the school was formed, which is overlooked by a beech tree woodland.

The schools motto is Crescentes Discimus (Latin for 'Growing we learn').

== Commandants ==
- Air Cdre F R Scarlett 8 December 1919 to 27 February 1924
- Air Cdre C L Lambe 28 February 1924 to 31 March 1928
- Air Cdre I M Bonham-Carter 1 April 1928 to 30 September 1931
- AVM N D K MacEwen 1 October 1931 to 26 December 1934
- Air Cdre J T Babington 27 December 1934 to 9 July 1936
- Air Cdre G R M Reid
- Air Cdre G B Dacre
- AVM O Swann
- Air Cdre G B Dacre
- Air Cdre H G White
- Air Cdre J F Titmas
- Air Cdre N Carter
- Air Cdre J G Elton
- Air Cdre J G W Weston
- Air Cdre G N E Tindal-Carill-Worsley
- Air Cdre E D McK Nelson
- Air Cdre T N Coslett
- Air Cdre B Robinson
- Air Cdre D M Strong
- Air Cdre A C Deere
- Air Cdre H P Connelly
- Air Cdre R H G Weighill
- Air Cdre B Hamilton
- Air Cdre M P Stanton
- Gp Capt J P Downes
- Gp Capt O J Truelove
- Gp Capt Michael J Evans (70th entry of apprentices) - past Chairman of the Old Haltonians Association
- Gp Capt S P Rarsons
- Gp Capt R H Kyle
- Gp Capt S M Williamson-Noble
- Gp Capt Ian R Blunt (84th entry of apprentices) - past Chairman of the Old Haltonians Association (b. 1940; d. 20 November 2010)
- Gp Capt Rodney Brumpton (retired as Air Commodore) (106th entry of apprentices) - past Chairman of the Old Haltonians Association
- Gp Capt Geoffrey O Burton (100th entry of apprentices) - past Chairman of the Old Haltonians Association
