= No. 529 Squadron RAF =

- Active: 15 June 1943 – 20 October 1945
- Country: United Kingdom
- Branch: Royal Air Force
- Role: Radar calibration

Insignia
- Squadron Codes: KX (Jun 1943 – Oct 1945)

No. 529 Squadron RAF was a radar calibration unit of the Royal Air Force during World War II. The unit had the distinction to be the only RAF unit to fly autogyros and helicopters operationally during World War II.

== History ==
No. 529 Squadron was formed on 15 June 1943 from No. 1448 Flight at RAF Halton. This flight under the experienced rotary aircraft pilot Squadron Leader Alan Marsh had pioneered radar calibration using Autogyros and light aircraft and the squadron continued to do this until after the end of World War II. On 16 August 1944 the squadron moved to a field at Crazies Farm, Henley-on-Thames and on that field they became the first RAF squadron to fly a helicopter for operational use, when they received their first Vought-Sikorsky Hoverfly. It was disbanded on 20 October 1945 at RAF Henley-on-Thames.

== Aircraft operated ==
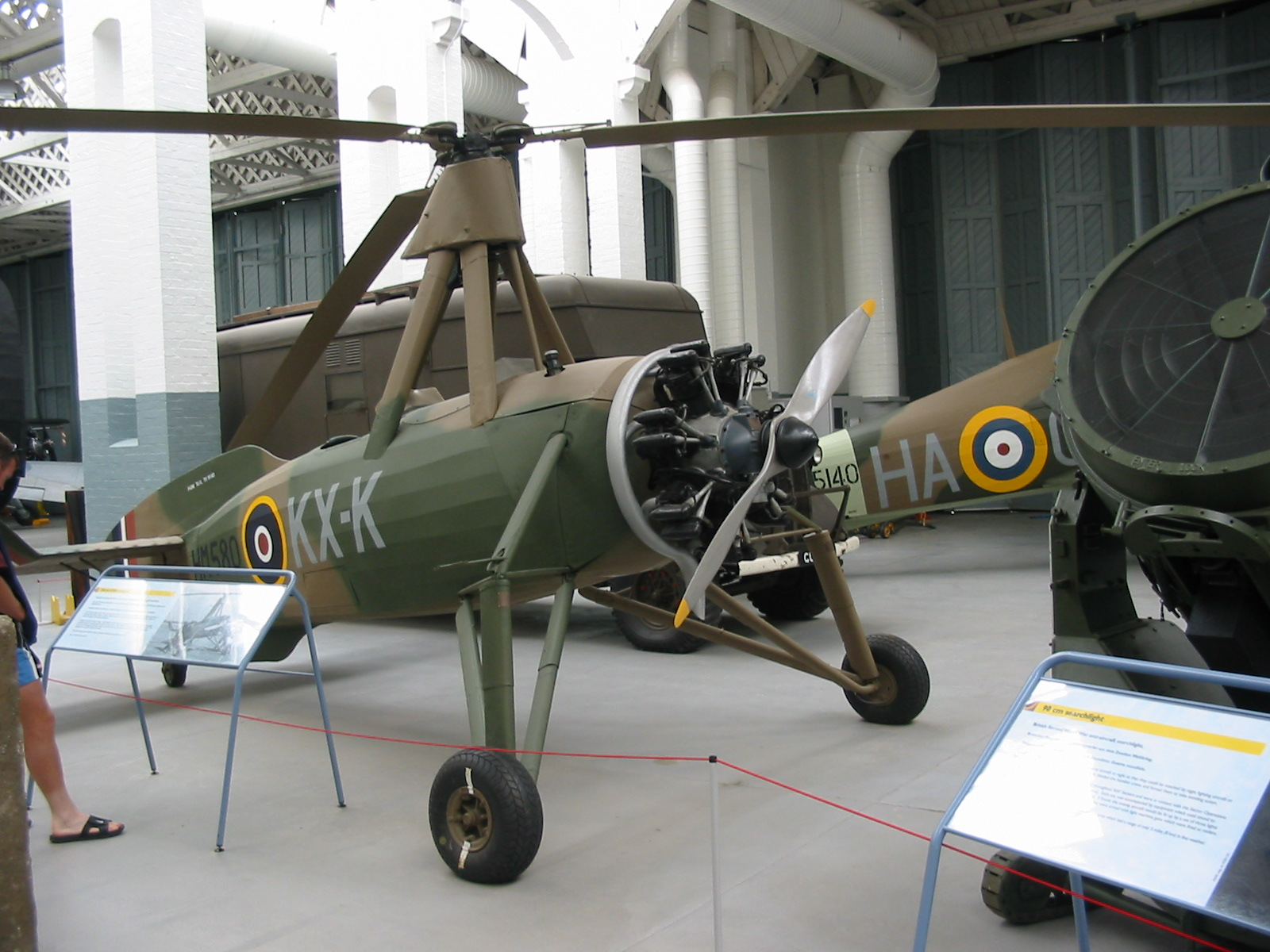
A Cierva C.30 (Rota Mk.I) of no. 529 Squadron, now at Duxford.

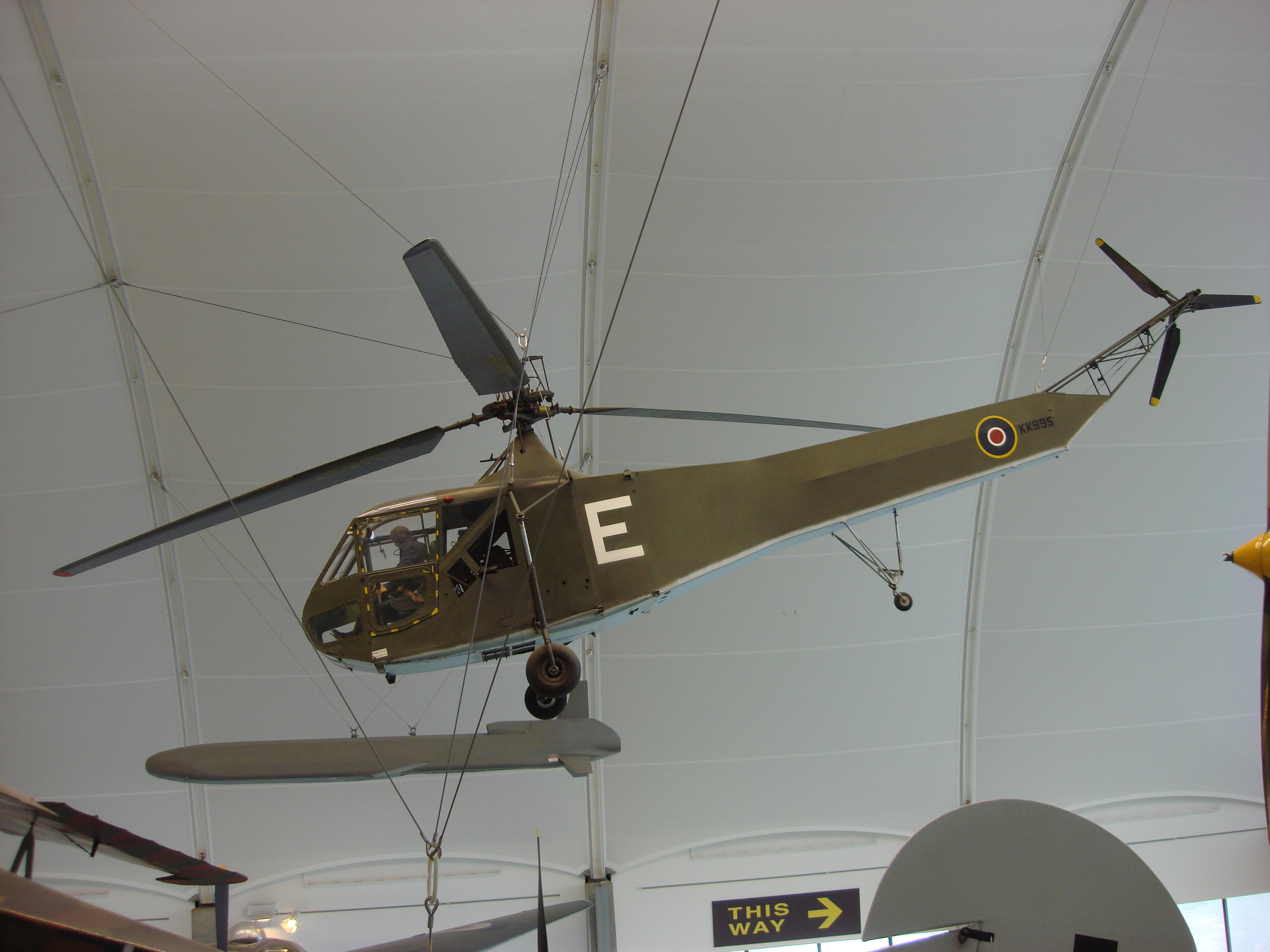
A Vought-Sikorsky Hoverfly, now at Hendon.

Aircraft operated by No. 529 Squadron, data from
From	To	Aircraft	Version
June 1943	October 1945	Avro Rota	Mk.Ia
June 1943	October 1945	de Havilland Hornet Moth	
June 1943	July 1944	Avro Rota	Mk.II
September 1944	October 1945	Airspeed Oxford	Mks.I, II
May 1945	October 1945	Vought-Sikorsky Hoverfly	Mk.I

== Squadron bases ==
Bases and airfields used by No. 529 Squadron RAF, data from
From	To	Base
15 June 1943	16 August 1944	RAF Halton, Buckinghamshire
16 August 1944	20 October 1945	RAF Henley-on-Thames, Oxfordshire
