= No. 1 School of Military Aeronautics =

Coordinates: 51°27′15″N 0°58′23″W

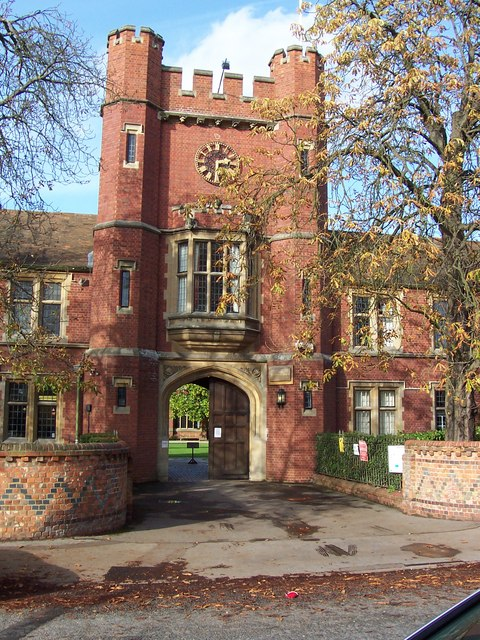
Wantage Hall in 2010

The No 1 School of Military Aeronautics was a World War I training school for the Royal Flying Corps (RFC), based in Reading, England. It was formed in 1915 as an instructors college - but expanded in 1916 into a full RFC training school. In 1917 technical skills were separated and moved to a nearby airfield, Coley Park, as the School of Technical Training. All training at the school was on the ground; ranging from theoretical subjects through to practical training (e.g. taxiing and artillery observation).

== History ==
In December 1915 the RFC commandeered buildings belonging to University College, Reading, at first for the purpose of training flight instructors. On 27 October 1916 the school was expanded to include cadet pilot and observer training, and designated No 1 School of Military Aeronautics (at the same time, No 2 school was opened in Oxford). The school's headquarters were in Yeomanry House, while most of the lessons were taught at Wantage Hall (a recently built hall of residence belonging to the University). Practical classes were held in Upper Redlands Road and nearby playing fields.

The school provided preliminary training for cadets and taught theoretical aspects of flight; including map reading, gunnery and mechanics. A small airfield was established at nearby Coley Park in around 1917. Technical trades were split off from the flight school, as the School of Technical Training, which operated from a jam factory adjoining the airfield. In September 1917 technical training was consolidated at Halton Camp, although Coley Park appears to have remained open for the rest of the war.

Many of the instructors were veterans of the Western Front. Still young men, they often struggled to teach the cadets who were of a similar age. Another veteran, Ian Bonham Carter, was the school Commandant between 1916 and 1917. For the observers the school had a room mocked up for artillery observation: a light-studded map was painted onto the floor and a mock fuselage hung from the ceiling.

== Notable graduates ==
- Andrew Beauchamp-Proctor VC, DSO, MC*, DFC
- Dudley Clarke (future World War II deception officer)
- Francis Howard Bickerton (Antarctic explorer)
- William Earl Johns (author of the Biggles books)
