= No. 7644 Squadron RAuxAF =

No. 7644 (VR) Public Relations Squadron, RAuxAF
- Active: 1940 – Present. As a squadron: 1997 – Present
- Country: United Kingdom
- Branch: Royal Air Force
- Role: Media Operations
- Garrison/HQ: RAF Halton
- Mottos: Verite a Jamais ("Truth or Nothing")

Commanders
- Current commander: Wing Commander Andy Pawsey
- Honorary Air Commodore: Peter Brown, MBE

No. 7644 (VR) Public Relations Squadron, Royal Auxiliary Air Force is a unit of the British Royal Air Force. The VR designation indicates the unit's history as part of the Royal Air Force Volunteer Reserve (RAFVR). The squadron's role is to provide Media Operations (military speak for public relations) support for RAF and NATO forces world-wide in times of peace and war. The unit is based at RAF Halton in Buckinghamshire.

== History ==
What was to become No. 7644 Squadron was the 1940 brainchild of Lord Beaverbrook. The government of the time identified the need to keep the public informed about the war, giving the hard facts, but also introducing servicemen and women telling their own stories. It was realised that the reporters covering the stories needed to be guided by people with dual expertise.

Lord Beaverbrook's idea was to find information experts with a service background or interest and ask them to become officers in each of the Armed Forces. Almost everyone approached volunteered and so was formed the first specialist public relations unit in the RAFVR.

After the war, the RAF recognised the benefits of maintaining a small number of journalists in uniform. After being part of other units, these PR specialists became No. 7644 (VR) Public Relations Squadron RAuxAF at the amalgamation of the RAFVR and the RAuxAF on 5 April 1997.

== Role ==
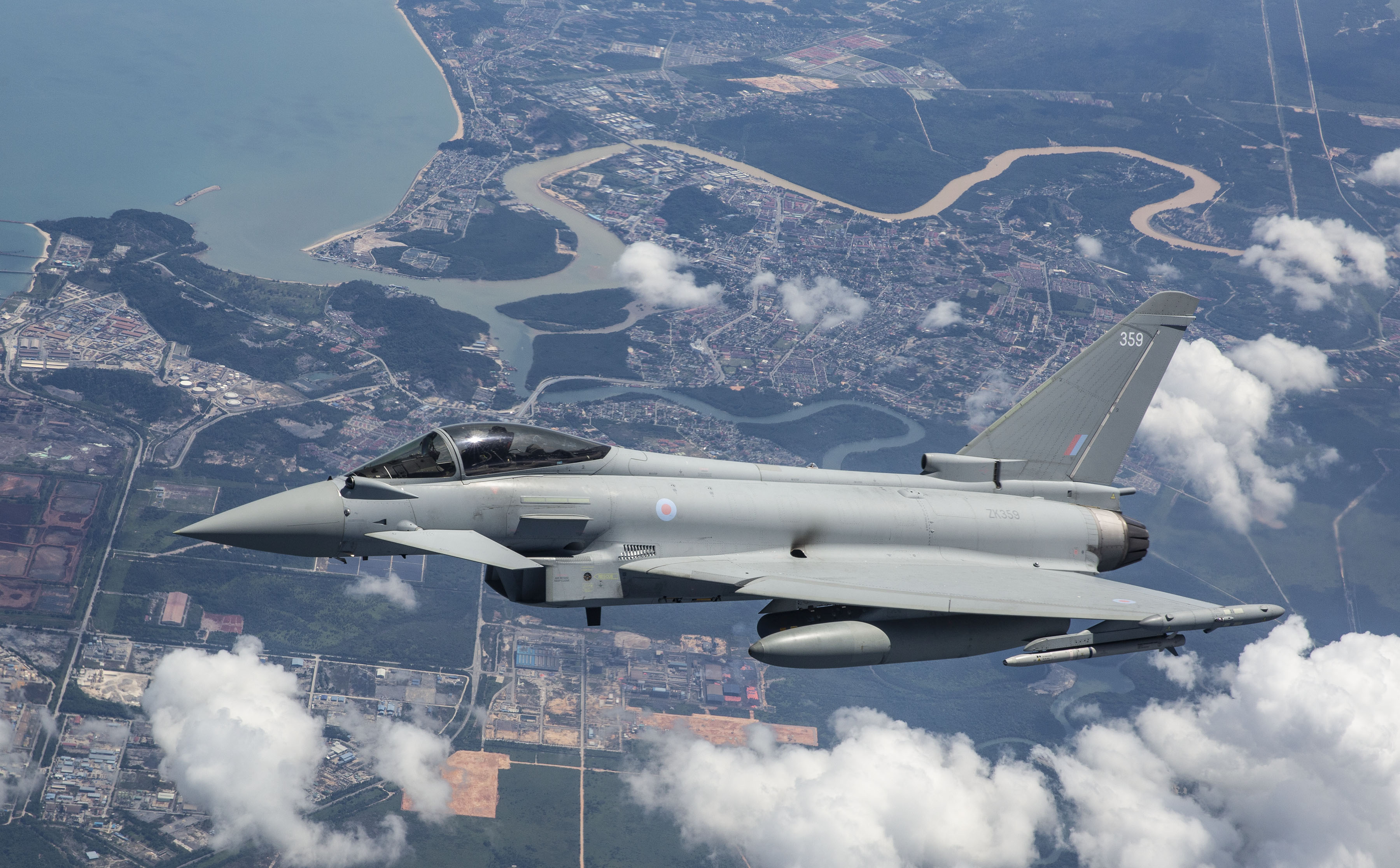
Ex BERSAMA LIMA 2019 m358

=== Media Operations ===
The RAF has full-time officers serving in communications, notably at No. 7644 Squadron's headquarters unit, Media & Communication Group at Air Command, RAF High Wycombe. No. 7644 Squadron personnel support these professionals whenever required. The role might be to organise a one-off media facility, or provide longer term effort by standing in as a Corporate Communications Officer at an RAF Station, or running a Media Operations unit on a Deployed Operating Base, as for example during the Iraq War.

Using its journalist's skills, the squadron prepares a large number of news releases, 'home town stories' on serving personnel, and video and audio news releases for the media. Often exercises and operations in the Royal Air Force happen at short notice, and in distant parts of the world. Organising a full press trip may not be possible, or affordable, so No. 7644 Squadron can provide the personnel and equipment to gather material which is sent out to media at home for them to make their own stories out of.

=== Media Training ===
The Royal Air Force is keen to promote its image, and develop a reputation for being open and honest. To achieve this, officers of all ranks need a range of media training and particularly interview training. This gives them the confidence to agree to interview requests from the media, and be able to answer questions directly in a friendly manner, supported by appropriately trained specialist media staff. No. 7644 Squadron provides a range of media training, supporting units such as the Media Operations Training unit based at RAF Halton, the Joint Services Command and Staff College at Shrivenham, and the Royal College of Defence Studies in London.

=== 'Simpress' ===
No. 7644 Squadron officers act as simulated press during exercises to give RAF personnel experience with media contact and prepare them for interview environments. These training scenarios range from small events to major, multi-day exercises involving hundreds of personnel, where media relations represent one component of the broader operation. The training focuses on utilizing realistic and demanding questioning techniques to prepare personnel for challenging media encounters.

=== InsideAIR ===
7644 Sqn personnel produce, edit and write the Royal Air Force's official fortnightly podcast, called 'InsideAIR' which offers "A behind the wire view of the RAF, its people, technology and operations.". A new podcast is published every two weeks here RAF InsideAIR podcast

=== Other media and publications ===
No. 7644 Squadron produces various individual pieces of work ranging from magazines and other publications, to video productions.
