= Robert Gordon (RAF officer) =

Royal Air Force Air Commodore (1882-1954)

- Born: 22 February 1882; Rangoon, Burma, British India
- Died: 25 September 1954 (aged 72); Newton Abbot, England
- Military career
- Allegiance: United Kingdom
- Branch: Royal Marines (1900–18); Royal Air Force (1918–25)
- Service years: 1900–25
- Rank: Air Commodore
- Commands: No. 3 Group (1925); No. 1 Group (1924); RAF Trans-Jordania (1922–23); No. 15 Group (1918–19); RNAS Mudros (1918); No. 2 Wing RNAS (1917–18); Naval Flying School, Eastchurch (1914–15)
- Conflicts: First World War
- Awards: Companion of the Order of the Bath; Companion of the Order of St Michael and St George; Distinguished Service Order; Mentioned in Despatches (2)

Air Commodore Robert Gordon, CB, CMG, DSO (22 January 1882 – 25 September 1954) was an early British military aviator. As a Royal Marines officer he held various posts in the Royal Naval Air Service during the First World War. From 1918 onwards, he was a senior officer in the Royal Air Force. He notably commanded the RAF's Z Force in British Somaliland in 1920 as part of the Dervish war.

== Early life and career ==
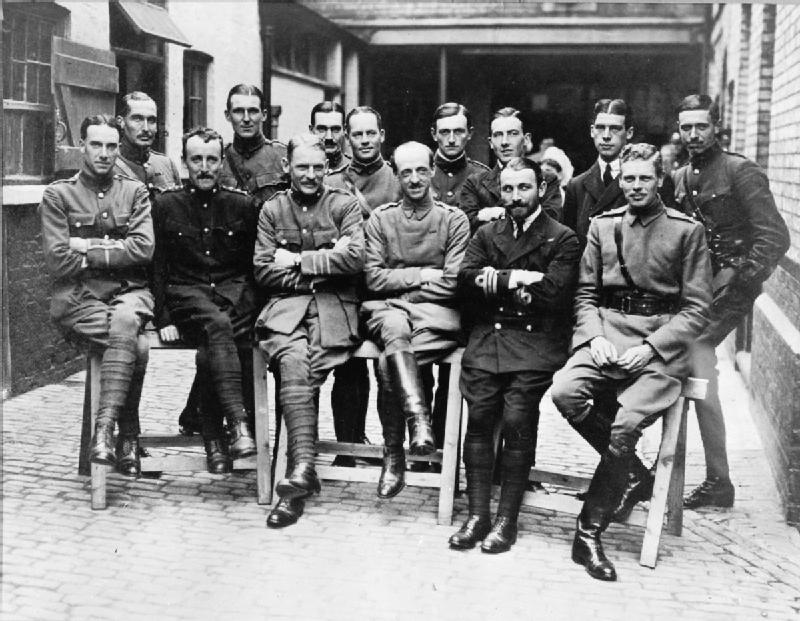
Gordon (3rd from left) with fellow RFC officers c1913

Gordon was born 22 January 1882 in Rangoon, Burma. He was educated at Fettes College before joining the Royal Marines Light Infantry as a second lieutenant on 1 January 1900. In 1912, Gordon was among the first group of aviators to be taught at Eastchurch. He later became a flying officer in the Royal Flying Corps' Naval Wing when it was formed.

At the start of the first world war, Gordon commanded the naval air station at Dundee. In 1915, he moved to East Africa for operations to destroy the German cruiser Königsberg. For this work he was awarded the Distinguished Service Order. Following promotion to wing commander, Gordon served in Mesopotamia and Italy and then moved to the Eastern Mediterranean, where he commanded No. 2 Wing of the Royal Naval Air Service in the Aegean. He transferred to the Royal Air Force when it was formed in 1918 and after service in south Russia he was awarded a permanent commission in the RAF.

Following promotion to group captain, Gordon was to command the RAF in Egypt and British Somaliland. After his time in the latter protectorate, he was Officer Commanding No. 3 Group before taking up command of RAF Trans-Jordania. After some time as a supernumerary in 1923, Gordon attended the Senior Officers' Course at the Royal Naval College, Greenwich. The following year, he was appointed Officer Commanding No. 1 Group and 1925 saw Gordon promoted to air commodore and made Air Officer Commanding No. 3 Group in what was a return to his old command. Gordon retired at his own request only seven months later.

During the Second World War, Gordon returned to duty as the Scottish Deputy Area Commandant of the Observer Corps. He died on 25 September 1954.

Military offices
New title Organisation established	Officer Commanding RAF Trans-Jordania; 1922–1923	Succeeded by Norman MacEwen
Preceded by Eugene Gerrard	Officer Commanding No. 1 Group; July – December 1924	Succeeded by P L W Herbert
Preceded by Lionel Charlton	Air Officer Commanding No. 3 Group; January – September 1925	Succeeded by Ian Bonham-Carter
