= No. 11/18 Group RAF =

Former Royal Air Force operations group

- Royal Air Force Ensign
- Active: 1 April 1996 – 7 January 2000
- Country: United Kingdom
- Branch: Royal Air Force
- Type: Royal Air Force group
- Role: Air Defence; Maritime Reconnaissance; Search and Rescue
- Part of: RAF Strike Command
- Headquarters: RAF Bentley Priory

Commanders
- Notable commanders: Air Marshal Clifford Rodney Spink CB, CBE, FCMI, FRAeS; Air Chief Marshal Sir Brian Kevin Burridge KCB, CBE, ADC, FCMI, FRAeS

No. 11/18 Group was a short-lived formation of Strike Command in the Royal Air Force. It was formed in 1996 as part of the post-Cold War reorganisation of the RAF. It absorbed the forces of No. 11 and No. 18 Groups, which were descended from the old Fighter Command and Coastal Command functional commands. It only lasted until 2000, when a further reorganisation of Strike Command saw its assets transferred to No. 1 and No. 3 Groups. The headquarters appears to have been based at RAF Bentley Priory, the last use of the underground command facilities there, as the successor groups were moved to RAF High Wycombe.

When 18 Group was amalgamated with No. 11 Group, the new 11/18 Group HQ applied for and was awarded a unique badge which showed the Fighter Command Portcullis and sword design on the original Coastal Command background of blue and white waves. However, they also wanted to keep the old motto from the 18 Group badge, which translated from the Latin to "They shall not pass with impunity" but could not do so as this was officially the motto of a different unit. So, with great ingenuity, they enlisted the help of a Latin scholar who changed the ending of one word so that the motto meant the same as before but was technically different, and 11/18 Group got what they wanted.

== Commanders ==
During the few years of its existence, No. 11/18 Group only had two air officers commanding. They were:

- 1 April 1996: Air Vice-Marshal Clifford Rodney Spink
- July 1998: Air Vice-Marshal Brian Kevin Burridge
