= Brian Burridge =

Royal Air Force Air Chief Marshal (born 1949)

Air Chief Marshal Sir Brian Burridge KCB CBE ADC FCMI FRAeS
- Born: 26 September 1949 (age 77); Maidstone, Kent, England
- Military career
- Allegiance: United Kingdom
- Branch: Royal Air Force
- Service years: 1967–2006
- Rank: Air Chief Marshal
- Commands: Strike Command (2003–06); Joint Services Command and Staff College (2000–02); No. 11/18 Group (1998–00); RAF Kinloss (1990–92)
- Conflicts: Iraq War
- Awards: Knight Commander of the Order of the Bath; Commander of the Order of the British Empire

Air Chief Marshal Sir Brian Kevin Burridge, (born 26 September 1949) is a retired Royal Air Force officer. A former Nimrod pilot, Burridge was in overall command of British forces under Operation Telic during the 2003 invasion of Iraq.

== RAF career ==
Brian Burridge joined the Royal Air Force as a university cadet (as a member of Cambridge University Air Squadron), being commissioned on 24 September 1967. He was a pilot with an operational background in the maritime patrol role, serving on Nos 206 and 120 Squadrons.

Burridge was promoted to the rank of Pilot Officer on 15 July 1970, to Flying Officer on 15 January 1971, Flight Lieutenant on 13 April 1972 to Squadron Leader on 1 July 1979 and to Wing Commander on 1 July 1985. In 1986 he attended the Royal Naval Staff College and then later that year went on to command No. 236 Operational Conversion Unit RAF. Promoted to Group Captain in 1990, he became officer commanding RAF Kinloss.

From 1992 Burridge served in the Ministry of Defence, initially as Deputy Director of Force Doctrine (RAF) and later becoming the Director of Force Development in the Central Staff before being made Principal Staff Officer to the Chief of the Defence Staff in 1994 in the rank of Air Commodore. In 1997 he attended the Cabinet Office Top Management Programme and then later in the year became a Defence Fellow at King's College London. In 1998 he attended the Higher Command and Staff Course being promoted to Air Vice Marshal on 1 July 1998. He then served as Air Officer Commanding No. 11/18 Group RAF. In January 2000 he became Commandant of the Joint Services Command and Staff College, subsequently moving the college into a Public Private Partnership at Shrivenham. On 12 February 2002, Burridge was promoted to air marshal and appointed Deputy Commander-in-Chief, Strike Command.

Burridge was in overall command of British forces under Operation Telic during the 2003 invasion of Iraq. In June 2003, Burridge appeared before the Commons Defence Select Committee, telling MPs of delays in distributing equipment to troops in Iraq and of his role in vetoing potentially controversial air strikes while he was in command in Iraq. He was appointed a Knight Commander of the Order of the Bath "for gallant and distinguished services whilst on operations in Iraq during the period 19 March to 19 April 2003" on 31 October 2003.

In July 2003 Burridge became Commander-in-Chief RAF Strike Command. He served as air Aide-de-Camp to Queen Elizabeth II from 31 July 2003 to 17 January 2006. He retired on 18 January 2006 with the rank of Air Chief Marshal, though his commission in the reserve was extended to January 2015.

On 8 December 2009, Burridge gave evidence to The Iraq Inquiry.

On 1 October 2018, Burridge became chief executive officer of the Royal Aeronautical Society.

== Interests ==
In 2005 Air Marshal Burridge was president of the RAF Mountaineering Association and a trustee of the Windsor Leadership Trust. Burridge sat as chair of the Bentley Priory Battle of Britain Trust and was present at the facility's closing ceremony in 2007. He attained a master's degree in business administration from the Open University.

Military offices
| Preceded by Cliff Spink | Air Officer Commanding No. 11/18 Group; 1998–2000 | Group disbanded |
| Preceded by Timothy Granville-Chapman | Commandant of the Joint Services Command and Staff College; 2000–2002 | Succeeded by John Lippiett |
| Preceded by Sir Jock Stirrup | Deputy Commander-in-Chief RAF Strike Command; 2002–2003 | Succeeded by Sir Glenn Torpy |
| Preceded by Sir John Day | Commander-in-Chief RAF Strike Command; 2003–2006 | Succeeded by Sir Joe French |
Honorary titles
| Preceded by Sir John Day | Air Aide-de-Camp to Her Majesty The Queen; 2003–2006 | Succeeded by Sir Joe French |
