= Cockpole Green =

Hamlet in Berkshire, England

Coordinates: 51.523°N 0.846°W

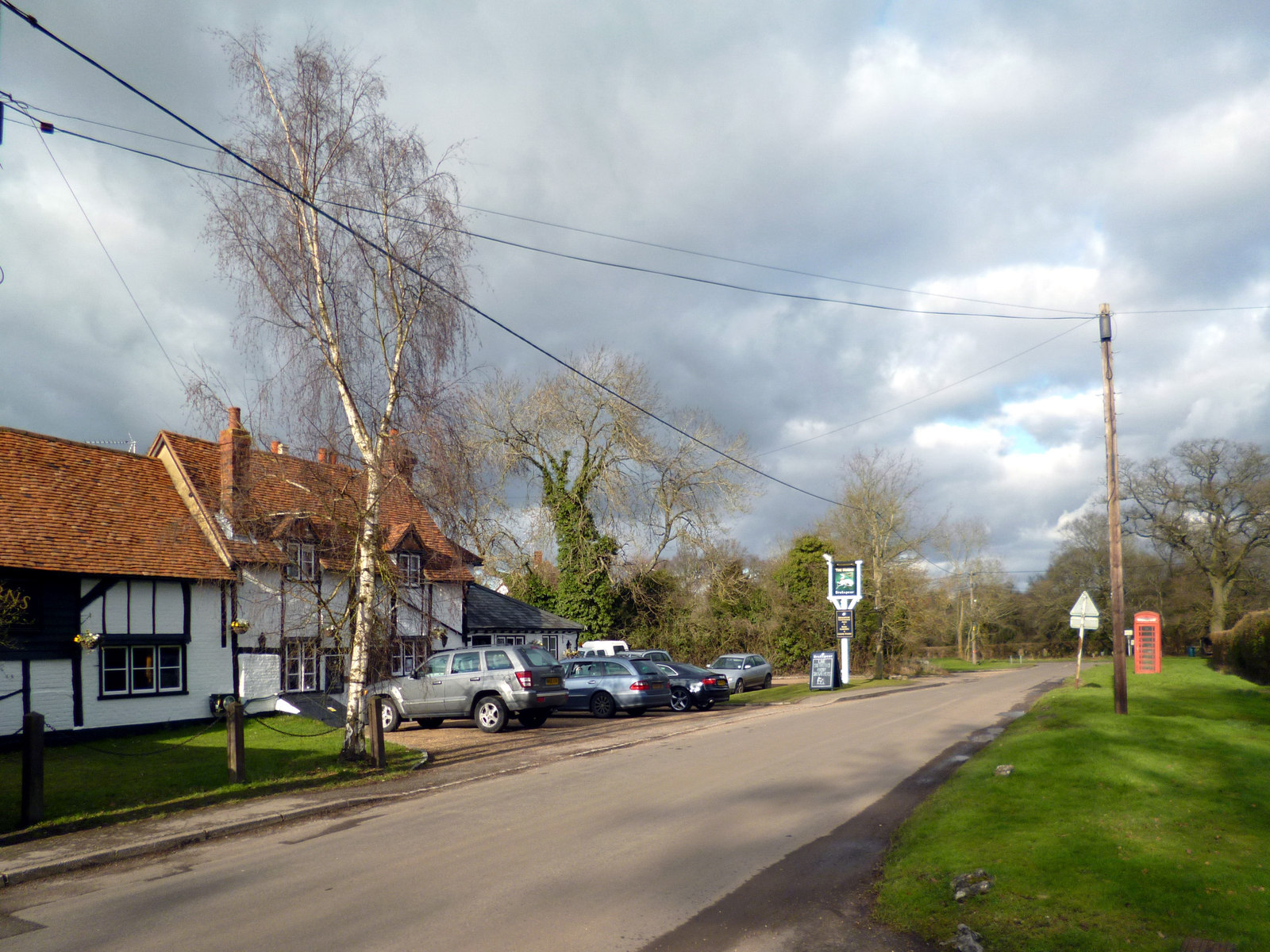
- The Horns

- Location within Berkshire
- OS grid reference: SU800811
- Unitary authority: Wokingham, Windsor and Maidenhead
- Ceremonial county: Berkshire
- Region: South East
- Country: England
- Sovereign state: United Kingdom
- Post town: Reading
- Postcode district: RG10
- Dialling code: 0118
- Police: Thames Valley
- Fire: Royal Berkshire
- Ambulance: South Central
- UK Parliament: Berkshire

Cockpole Green is a hamlet in Berkshire, England. Part, including the original village green, lies within the civil parish of Hurley (where according to the Post Office in the 2011 Census the majority of the population is included) in the borough of Windsor and Maidenhead, and part within the civil parish of Wargrave in Wokingham Borough.

Therefore, it is served by two unitary authorities. The settlement lies near to the A321 road, and is situated approximately 2.5 miles (4.0 km) east of Henley-on-Thames.

A small registered charity, the Cockpole Green Women's Institute, has assisted with education and cultural activities.

Cockpole Green is adjacent to Crazies Hill, and their odd names have attracted media attention.
