= Aircraft Apprentice Scheme =

Training programme in the Royal Air Force

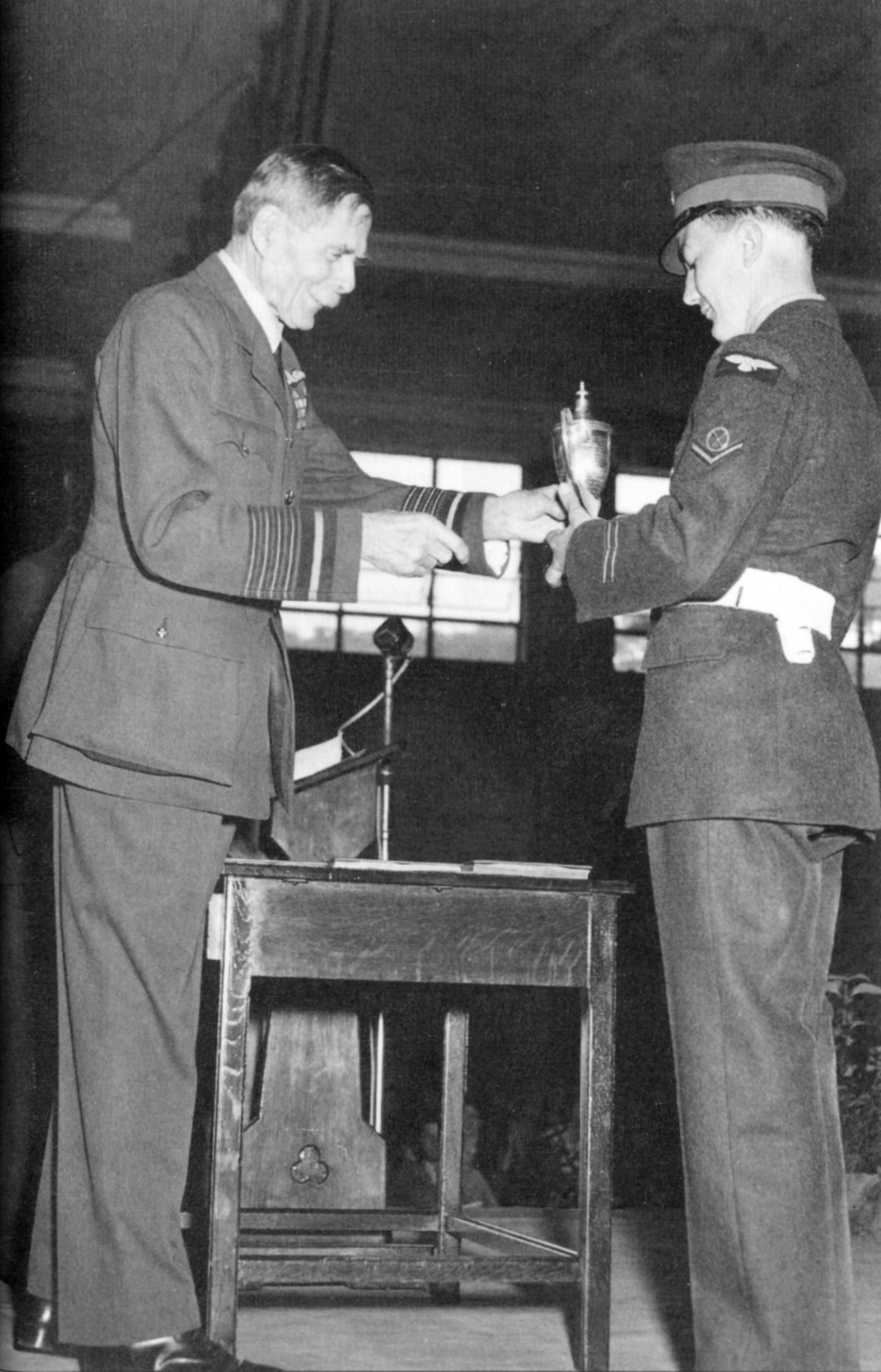
Lord Trenchard presenting a trophy to an RAF Halton apprentice

The Aircraft Apprentice Scheme was a training programme for Royal Air Force ground crew personnel which ran from 1920 to 1966.

== Formation ==
World War I saw the beginning of aerial combat. By 1 April 1918 the Royal Flying Corps and the Royal Naval Air Service had amalgamated into the Royal Air Force. Hugh Trenchard had been appointed Chief of the Air Staff and quickly discovered that specialist groundcrew were in very short supply.

Wartime use of aircraft accelerated the development of new technologies. Aircraft power plants were vastly different from those that powered buses and lorries. Airframes, with their need to reduce drag and provide control in the air, were a totally new challenge. Armourers were asked to develop new fusing methods for equally new explosive devices like air-dropped bombs. Aircraft electrical systems included bomb release mechanisms and synchronised gun firing through the propeller via the use of an interrupter mechanism. The addition of a third dimension to navigation meant aircraft instrument makers had to produce new indicators for such things as turn and bank, air speed and an artificial horizon.

For these reasons and others, Trenchard instituted the Aircraft Apprentice Scheme to be based at RAF Halton No. 1 School of Technical Training. Because of lack of accommodation at Halton, the school was originally located at RAF Cranwell in 1920. In 1922 the school moved permanently to RAF Halton and was fully operational by 1926. The Aircraft Apprentice School at RAF Cranwell (Nos. 1 and 6 Radio Schools) continued to train apprentices exclusively for the ground and air radio trades. The apprentice school at Cranwell operated until October 1952 before being transferred to RAF Locking.

== Training ==
Entrance to the scheme involved a highly competitive exam, intelligence and aptitude tests, and medical examinations. Admittance was limited exclusively to males between the ages of 15 and 17½ and the Royal Air Force assumed legal guardianship of the boys in loco parentis.

Initially, training was a three-year course, although this was changed briefly to two years for some apprentice entries during the Second World War. Training took place over five and a half days a week, and consisted of both academic and practical training. In addition, basic military training was given. Originally, applicants were required to be British subjects and of "pure European descent" (and were required to prove this if there was any doubt). Apprentices were later accepted from both Commonwealth and other countries.

106 Entry, which passed out in December 1966, was the last of the Aircraft Apprentice entries. A three-year Technician Apprentice scheme, a two-year Craft Apprentice scheme, and a one-year Administrative Apprentice scheme were initiated in September 1964, with 107 Entry being the first Technician Apprentice entry, 201 Entry being the first of the Craft Apprentice entries, and 301 Entry being the first of the Administrative Apprentice entries. A one-year scheme for mechanic apprentices was also subsequently introduced (the 400 series entry apprentices).

== Alumni ==
It is estimated that as many as forty per cent of the "Trenchard Brats" or the "Poacher's Brats" (as the Cranwell Apprentices were called because of their Lincolnshire connection), achieved commissioned rank, and a considerable number achieved Air rank.

Graduates of this scheme include several former officers of Air rank, including Air Commodore Sir Frank Whittle, father of the jet engine, Marshal of the Royal Air Force Sir Keith Williamson, Air Chief Marshal Sir Mike Armitage, Air Marshal Sir Graham Miller, and Air Marshal Cliff Spink

The Brats' alumni association, a registered charity, is called the RAF Halton Apprentices Association (RAFHAA), or Old Haltonians. It publishes a magazine called The Haltonian three times a year. A triennial reunion for Brats is organised by the association.

RAF Halton has its own memorial to the brats opposite Kermode Hall, very close to St George's Church, which contains stained glass windows commemorating the 40,000 or so apprentices who were trained there. Brats are also remembered at the Halton Grove, which is part of the National Memorial Arboretum, Alrewas, Staffordshire.
