= Crazies Hill =

Village in England, United Kingdom

Coordinates: 51°31′N 0°51′W

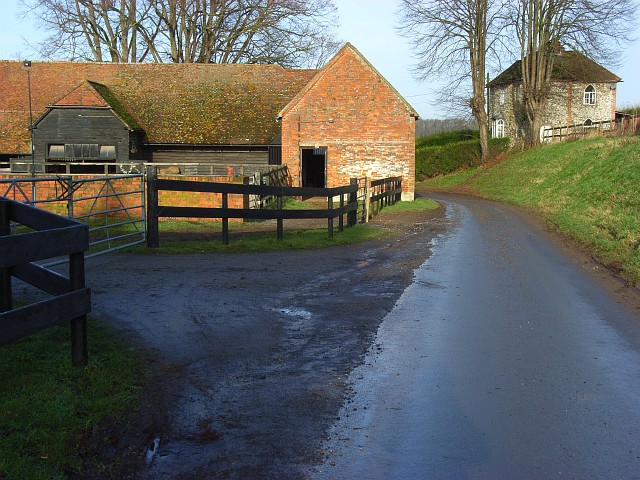
Dean Place Farm and Juddmonte House

Crazies Hill is a hamlet in the English county of Berkshire. It adjoins the hamlet of Cockpole Green. For local government purposes, the village is within the civil parish of Wargrave, which in turn is within the unitary authority of Wokingham. Crazies Hill Church of England Primary School is located in the village. About 0.6 miles (1 km) on the road to Wargrave is Hennerton Golf Club. The Village Hall was originally built to serve also as a Mission church and still contains the paraphernalia of an altar etc. behind folding doors.

Summerfield House, which is set in 23 acres (9.3 ha) of beautiful grounds and landscaped gardens, was originally built in 1790 as the Town Hall at nearby Henley-on-Thames. It was moved to Crazies Hill by Major WHM Willis during 1898 when the new Town Hall was built. He had the facade including the cupola and entrance hall re-erected here as the basis for his new country house originally called Crazies. By the side of a woodland track to the south of the hamlet is Rebecca's Well. This is the site of the spring which used to be the hamlet's water supply. In 1870, the curate of Wargrave, the Rev Grenville Phillimore, invited subscriptions to fund a proper basin for the spring to keep the water clean. Later further money was raised to build a brick structure around the spring to keep out fallen leaves and other debris.

In the village is the Horns public house, which is currently closed but being refurbished. Reopening is expected in spring 2025.
