= Robert Marsland Groves =

Royal Air Force Air Commodore (1880-1920)

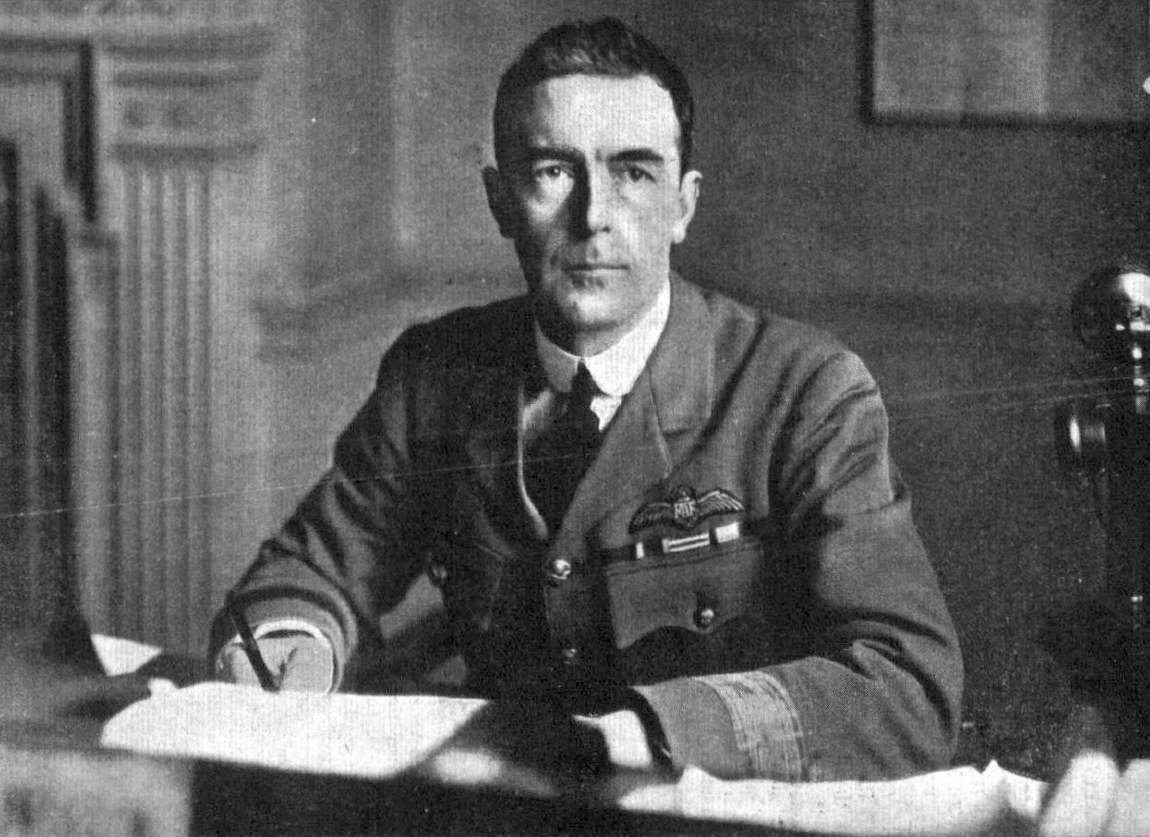
- Groves as Deputy Chief of the Air Staff
- Born: 3 January 1880; Stretford, Lancashire, England
- Died: 27 May 1920 (aged 40); Heliopolis, Egypt
- Military career
- Allegiance: United Kingdom
- Branch: Royal Navy (1899–1918); Royal Air Force (1918–20)
- Service years: 1899–1920
- Rank: Air Commodore
- Commands: Egyptian Group (1920); No. 1 Squadron RNAS (1916)
- Conflicts: First World War
- Awards: Companion of the Order of the Bath; Distinguished Service Order; Air Force Cross; Officer of the Legion of Honour (France); Distinguished Service Medal (United States)

Air Commodore Robert Marsland Groves, CB, DSO, AFC (3 January 1880 – 27 May 1920) was a Royal Navy officer involved with naval aviation during the First World War. He was awarded his Aviator's Certificate no. 969 on 15 November 1914. After transferring to the Royal Air Force in 1918, he served as Deputy Chief of the Air Staff and held high command in the Middle East. He was killed in a flying accident in 1920 aged 40 whilst serving in Egypt.

== Early life ==
Groves was born on 3 January 1880 at Stretford in Lancashire, England, the son of James Grimble Groves, a brewer and Conservative MP. He was educated at Rossall School.

== Naval service ==
Groves joined the Royal Navy as a midshipman in the 1890s, rising to sub-lieutenant by the summer of 1899 and then lieutenant on 15 February 1900. In September 1902 Groves was posted to the torpedo school ship HMS Vernon, to qualify as torpedo lieutenant.

Groves was promoted to commander on 22 June 1911 and the following year, on 26 November 1912, he was appointed Flag Commander to the Commander-in-Chief Mediterranean on HMS Inflexible. He served in the First World War as Assistant Director of the Air Department at the Admiralty and then as Officer Commanding No. 1 Squadron RNAS before returning to the Admiralty to be Assistant Secretary of the Air Board. He was awarded the Distinguished Service Order in 1919, the citation for which was published in a supplement to the London Gazette on 22 June, reading:

Commander Robert Marsland Groves,. R.N. (Wing Commander, R.N.A.S.). In recognition of his services in command of a Wing of the Royal Naval Air Service at Dunkirk. Commander Groves has by his personal skill as a pilot, and also by his untiring zeal, effected a marked advancement in the general standard of flying on active service. He has on several occasions carried out successful reconnaissances to Ostend under fire, and by his own example has proved the utility and great importance of night flying."

== Royal Air Force ==
After the War, Groves became Deputy Chief of the Air Staff and Director of Operations and Intelligence. He went on to be Acting Air Officer Commanding RAF Middle East Area in 1919 and Air Officer Commanding Egyptian Group in 1920.

Groves died aged 40 on 27 May 1920 in Egypt from injuries received in an aircraft crash when his Bristol Fighter crashed after engine failure on takeoff at Almaza. He was buried at the Cairo New British Protestant Cemetery.

Military offices
Preceded by Mark Kerr	Deputy Chief of the Air Staff; 1918	Succeeded by Oliver Swann
Preceded by Oliver Swann; Only as Deputy Chief of the Air Staff	Deputy Chief of the Air Staff and Director of Operations and Intelligence; February 1919 – 8 September 1919	Succeeded by John Steel
New title Formed by renaming Training Brigade (Middle East)	Air Officer Commanding Egyptian Group; 16 March – 27 May 1920	Succeeded by Oliver Swann
