= Halton Railway =

Disused Buckinghamshire railway line

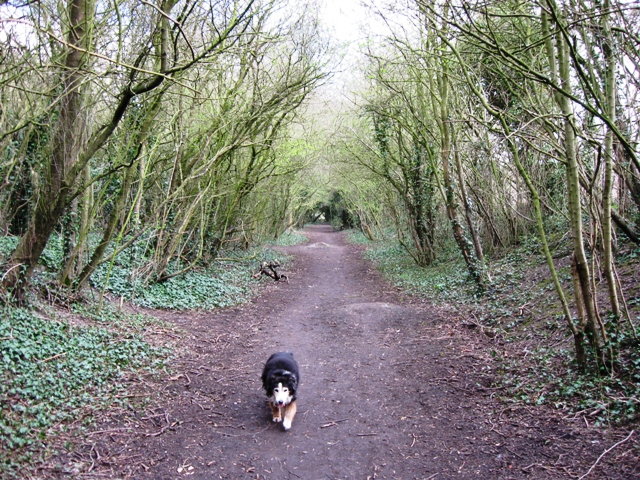
The Disused Railway Line from Wendover to RAF Halton

Halton Railway was a spur line from Wendover to RAF Halton used to transport coal and other goods to RAF Halton. It closed in 1963.

Opened in 1917 after an eight-week construction period, the branch line ran for 1.75 miles (2.82 km) and was constructed by German prisoners of war during World War I. The railway was originally built to carry building materials into the site for construction of the workshops and other units. It also forwarded coal to the boilers on camp. It was later converted from a narrow gauge of 1 ft 11 1/2 in (597 mm) to 4 ft 8 1/2 in (1,435 mm) standard gauge and was used to bring timber out of Halton woods. The conversion of boilers on the station from coal fired to oil fired, allowed road-tankers to take over the inward flow of fuel and accelerated the demise of the railway and the last train ran on 29 March 1963 with closure following two days afterwards.

The majority of the track has since been removed, including the original bridge over the Grand Union Canal which was replaced by a modern footbridge, however much of the line is designated a permissive footpath (rail trail).
