= RAF Halton =

Royal Air Force training base in England

RAF Halton
- Near Aylesbury, Buckinghamshire in England
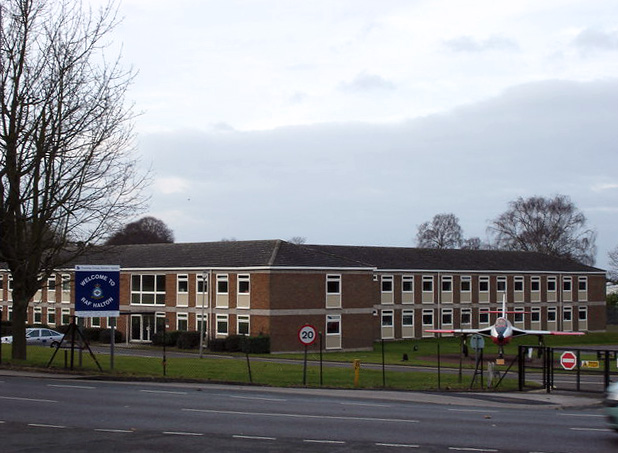
- Entrance to RAF Halton

- Teach, Learn, Apply

Site information
- Type: Royal Air Force training station
- Owner: Ministry of Defence
- Operator: Royal Air Force
- Controlled by: No. 22 Group (Training)
- Condition: Operational
- Website: Official website

Location
- Shown within Buckinghamshire
- Coordinates: 51°47′30″N 000°44′10″W
- Area: 297 hectares (730 acres)

Site history
- Built: 1913
- In use: 1913–present

Garrison information
- Current commander: Wing Commander Matt Sharrock
- Occupants: RAF Central Training School; International Defence Training (RAF); Specialist Training School (STS); Training Analysis Centre; No. 613 Volunteer Gliding Squadron; Joint Information Activities Group; No. 7644 (VR) Squadron RAuxAF; RAF Halton Pipes and Drums Band

Airfield information
- Identifiers: ICAO: EGWN
- Elevation: 369 feet (112 m) AMSL
Runways
Direction	Length and surface
02/20	1,161 metres (3,809 ft) Grass
07/25	868 metres (2,848 ft) Grass
- Source: Military Aviation Authority DSA - ASOEM v1.4

Royal Air Force Halton, or more simply RAF Halton, is a Royal Air Force station in the United Kingdom. It is located near the village of Halton near Wendover, Buckinghamshire. The site has been in use since the First World War but is due to close by 2030 at the earliest.

== History ==
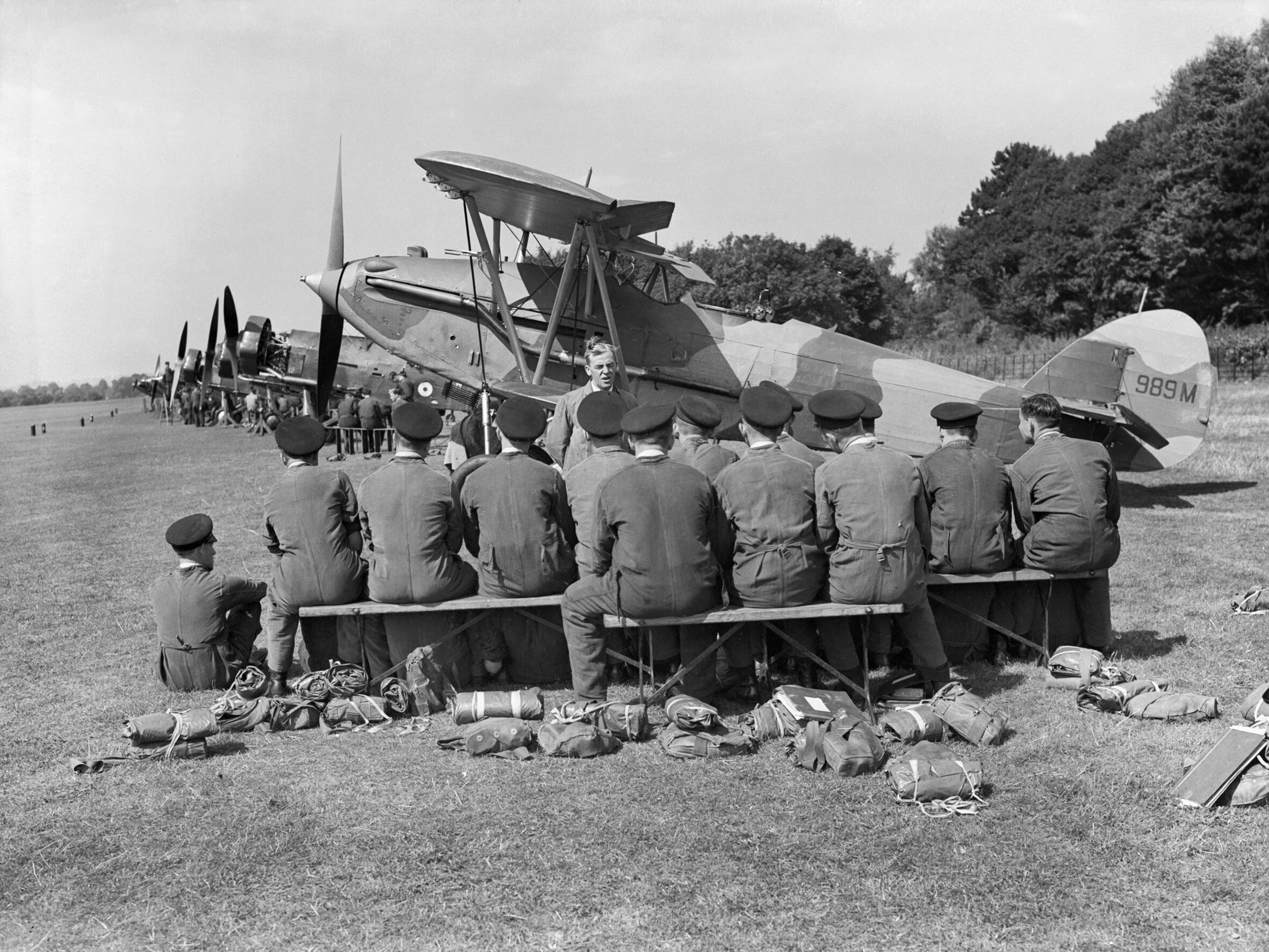
Apprentices of No. 1 School of Technical Training listen to a lecture on servicing aircraft in the field, in front of a line of instructional airframes, during the early 1940s

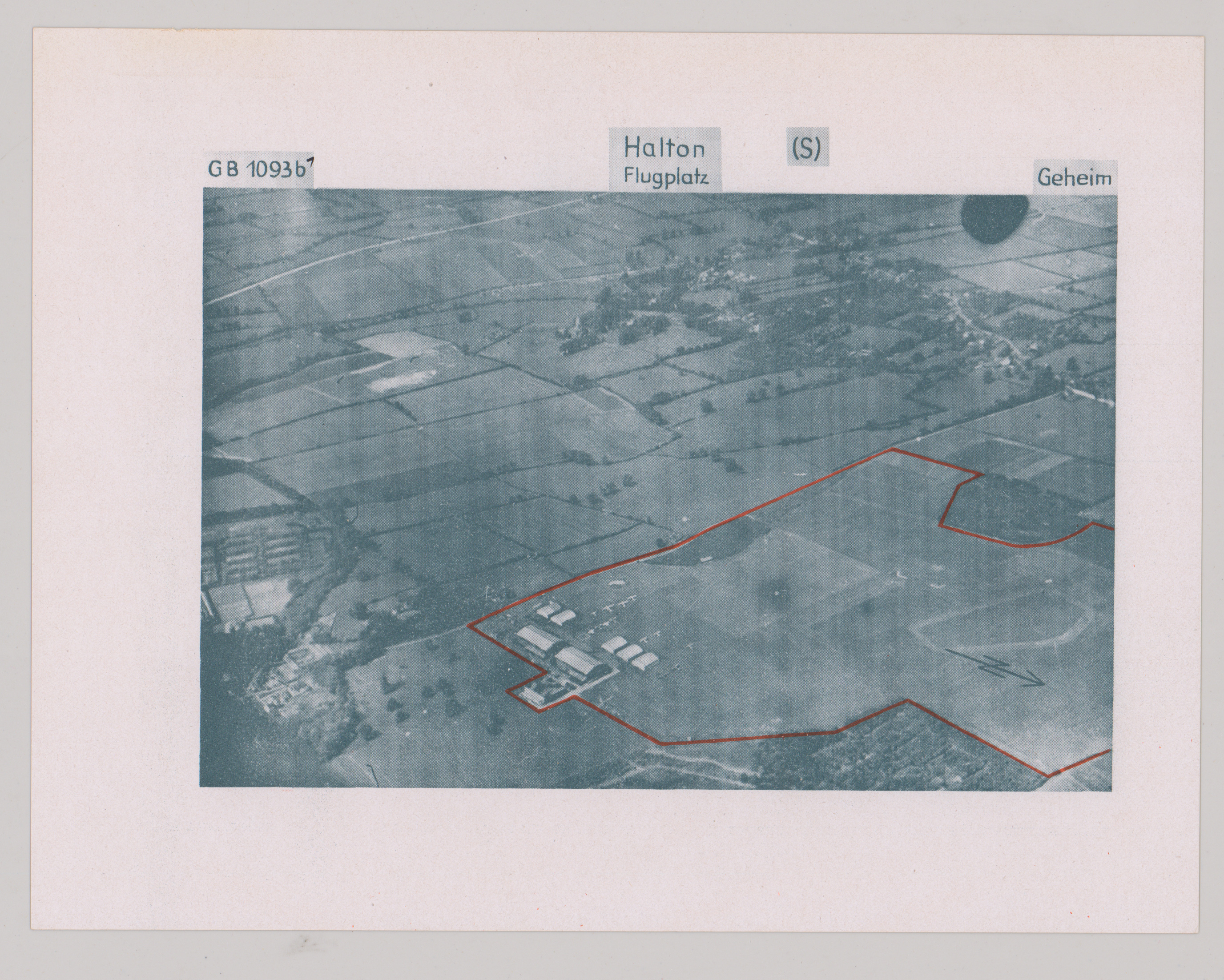
RAF Halton in the 1930s

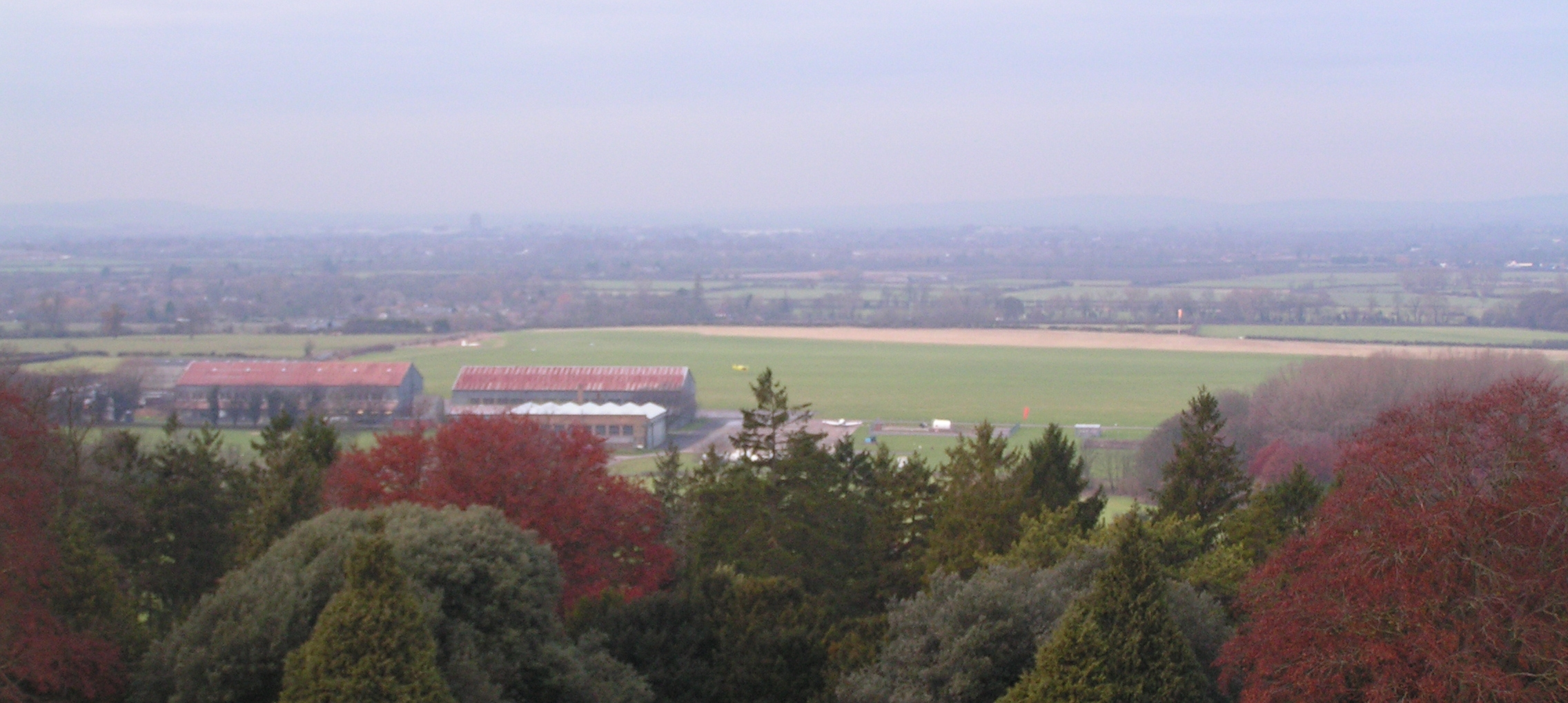
The grass airfield at RAF Halton

The first recorded military aviation at Halton took place in 1913 when the then owner of the Halton estate, Alfred de Rothschild, invited No 3 Squadron of the Royal Flying Corps to conduct manoeuvres on his land. Following a gentlemen's agreement between Rothschild and Lord Kitchener, the estate was used by the British Army throughout the First World War. In 1916 the Royal Flying Corps moved its air mechanics school from Farnborough, Hampshire to Halton, and in 1917, the school was permanently accommodated in workshops built by German PoWs.

The estate was purchased by the British Government for the nascent Royal Air Force at the end of the First World War for £112,000.

In 1919 Lord Trenchard established the No. 1 School of Technical Training at RAF Halton for RAF aircraft apprentices, which remained at the station until it moved to RAF Cosford in the early 1990s. Also in 1919, Halton House – a French-style mansion built for Alfred de Rothschild – was re-opened as the station's Officers' Mess, a role which the grade II listed building continued until 2025.

During the Second World War, RAF Halton continued its training role. Additionally No 112 Squadron and No 402 Squadron of the Royal Canadian Air Force were based at Halton for part of the war. No. 1448 (Radar Calibration) Flight was converted into No. 529 Squadron at Halton in June 1943. Initially, the squadron flew the Cierva C.30 and the de Havilland Hornet Moth and by the end of the war, the squadron was competent with autogyro aircraft.

In July 1952 the uncrowned Queen Elizabeth II performed one of her first duties as Sovereign by presenting a colour to Number 1 School of Technical Training; the first to be awarded to an apprentice school, and the first to be presented to an 'other rank' when Sergeant Apprentice Hines, of the 63rd Entry, received the colour from Her Majesty.

In 1967, RAF Halton was the site of the unsolved case of the murder of aircraftswoman Rita Ellis. The case was reopened in 2010 to take advantage of modern forensic techniques, and in 2017 a new DNA profile enabled the police to eliminate 200 of the original suspects. In late 2020, the Thames Valley Police's major crime review team issued a further appeal for anyone with information to come forward.

When No. 1 School of Technical Training moved to RAF Cosford in 1993, they took over guardianship of the Queen's Colour and on 31 October 1997, Her Majesty presented RAF Halton with its second colour. RAF Halton was the only station to be granted the dignity of two Queen's colours. The move of No. 1 School of Technical Training to RAF Cosford afforded space for the RAF School of Recruit Training to be moved from RAF Swinderby to RAF Halton in July 1993, where it has been ever since. In the year 2004–2005, RAF Halton trained 24,000 personnel, though not all were Phase 1 recruits; some were attending the Airman's Command School which trains Non-Commissioned Officers (NCO) in Phase 2 and 3 disciplines.

From 1917 to 1963, a spur railway line ran from Wendover to Halton to supply coal and goods to the station.

The history of the RAF station and specifically apprenticeship training over the years is preserved by the Trenchard Museum located at RAF Halton, and managed by the RAF Halton Apprentices Association. In 2010 a major project by members of the station re-excavated the training trenches used during the First World War and made them available as an educational exhibit.

No. 613 Volunteer Gliding Squadron, which operated the Grob Vigilant T1, was disbanded in November 2016 by the MoD as part of its Better Defence Estate strategy.

In July 2018, the headquarters of the Logistics Specialist Training Wing (LSTW) relocated to the new Defence College of Logistics, Policing and Administration at Worthy Down Camp in Hampshire. The remaining element of the LSTW, the Logistics Supply Training Squadron, moved to Worthy Down over the months following 24 October 2019.

The following units were here at some point:

- No. 1 Air Stores Park
- No. 2 Air Stores Park
- No. 3 Air Stores Park
- No. 4 Air Stores Park
- No. 5 Air Stores Park
- No. 5 (Signals) Wing RAF
- No. 6 Air Stores Park
- No. 7 Air Stores Park
- No. 9 Personnel Holding Unit (WAAF)
- No. 23 Communication Flight RAF
- No. 24 Elementary Flying Training School RAF
- No. 24 Communication Flight RAF
- No. 24 Technical Training Group RAF
- No. 24 Training Group RAF
- No. 60 Communication Flight RAF
- No. 121 Gliding School RAF
- No. 122 Gliding School RAF
- No. 612 Volunteer Gliding School RAF
- No. 613 Gliding School RAF
- No. 1448 (Radar Calibration) Flight RAF
- No. 2759 Squadron RAF Regiment
- Bomber Command Communication Flight RAF
- Polish Technical Training School
- RAF Depot
- School of Parachute Training
- School of Technical Training (Boys)
- School of Technical Training (Men)
  - RAF Police School
  - No. 6 RAF Police Squadron
  - Special Investigation Branch

=== RAF Hospital Halton ===
Princess Mary's RAF Hospital Halton was opened in 1927 as a large purpose-built military hospital, replacing an earlier makeshift medical facility housed in wooden huts that had been opened in 1919. The hospital was the second unit in the United Kingdom to have a renal facility, and besides developing a cure for Sandfly fever, the hospital was the first in the world to use penicillin on a large scale in 1940, just after its discovery.

The hospital was closed in 1995 due to Government defence cuts. The buildings remained derelict until 2008 when they were demolished for new housing in a development called Princess Mary Gate.

=== Airfield ===
The site has a grass airfield, used mainly by gliders, light aircraft, microlights and the RAF hot air balloon. The airfield is the home of the Royal Air Force Gliding & Soaring Association, Chilterns Gliding Centre, The Halton Aero Club and the RAF Halton Microlight Club.

The airfield was also used as the filming location for the German airfield in Wonder Woman.

== Based units ==
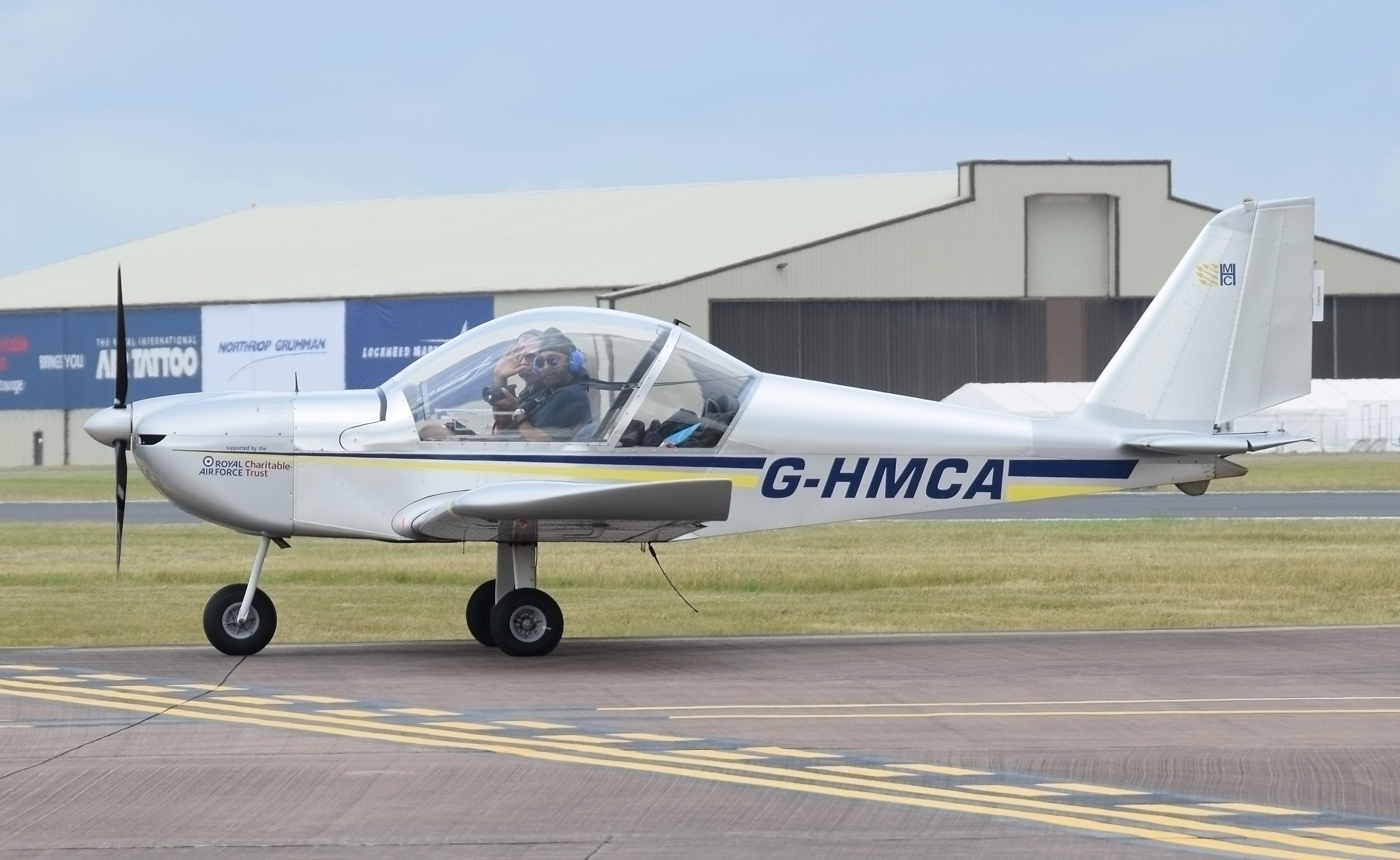
Evektor EV-97 Eurostar of the RAF Halton Microlight Flying Club

Flying and notable non-flying units based at RAF Halton.

=== Royal Air Force ===
No. 22 Group (Training) RAF

- The Aviator Training Academy (AvTA), consisting of two delivery squadrons:
  - Recruit Training Squadron (initial basic training for all non-commissioned entrants to the RAF)
  - Aviator Command Squadron (leadership and management training for non-commissioned officers)
- International Defence Training (RAF)
- Joint Service Adventurous Training (JSAT) (a merger of Defence Media Operations Centre (DMOC) and the Joint Information Operations Training and Advisory Team (JIOTAT))
  - Force Development Training Centre (Joint Service Gliding Centre)
- RAF Sports Board
- Central Training School (carries out training needs analysis, and proposes training strategies for RAF ground trades and branches, with the exception of medical and musician trades).
- Air Training Corps
  - Central and East Region
    - Hertfordshire & Buckinghamshire Wing Headquarters

No. 38 Group (Air Combat Service Support) RAF

- No. 7644 (VR) Public Relations Squadron (Royal Auxiliary Air Force)

RAF Voluntary Bands Association

- RAF Halton Voluntary Concert Band

RAF Pipe Bands Association

- RAF Halton Pipes and Drums Band

=== Joint Forces Command ===
Directorate of Joint Warfare

- Joint Information Activities Group (JIAG)

=== Civilian ===
- Specialist Training School (STS)
- RAF Gliding & Soaring Association
  - Chilterns Gliding Centre
- RAF Halton Aero Club – 3 x Cessna 152, 1 x Tecnam Sierra and 1 x Piper PA-28
- RAF Halton Microlight Club

== Future ==
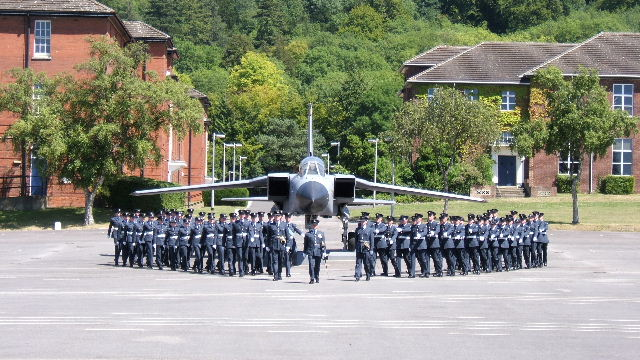
A Passing Out Parade at RAF Halton during July 2006

On 7 November 2016, in a speech to the House of Commons by the Defence Secretary, it was announced that the RAF Halton airfield would cease to be part of the Ministry of Defence (MoD) estate and was scheduled to be disposed of by 2022. The following month, a letter from the Defence Secretary to MP David Lidington confirmed the planned phases prior to disposal of the site:

- Phase 1 – Airfield disposal.
- Phase 2 – Relocation of School of Recruit Training and Airmen's Command School to RAF College Cranwell.
- Phase 3 – Relocation / rationalisation of lodger units.

On 28 February 2019, after a revision of the Defence Estates Optimisation Plan, MoD minister Tobias Ellwood MP announced that RAF Halton would not close until at least 2025. This was confirmed in letters sent from the Defence Infrastructure Organisation in May 2019 to local residents, stating that phased withdrawal would commence in 2022 with full disposal achieved in 2025. This was later extended with the airfield not closing until 2027. The plan to concentrate RAF recruit training for both officers and other ranks at RAF Cranwell was later put back by five years to 2030 at the earliest.

Following a public consultation, Buckinghamshire Council's Cabinet agreed a Supplementary Planning Document (SPD) for RAF Halton. The SPD will inform the planning and development decisions for RAF Halton near Wendover once it ceases to be a military base.

Following a structural survey of Halton House carried out in January 2025, a major defect was identified with officers and staff given 30 minutes to vacate the building which has remained closed and sealed since that time. It has been reported that the manor house will remain closed permanently and subsequently disposed of through the Defence Infrastructure Organisation.

== See also ==
- List of Royal Air Force stations
