= Observer officer =

Observer officer may refer to:

- A rank equivalent to pilot officer for non-pilots in the Royal Air Force, phased out between the World Wars
- A rank equivalent to flying officer used in the Royal Observer Corps
