= Royal Observer Corps Orlit Post =

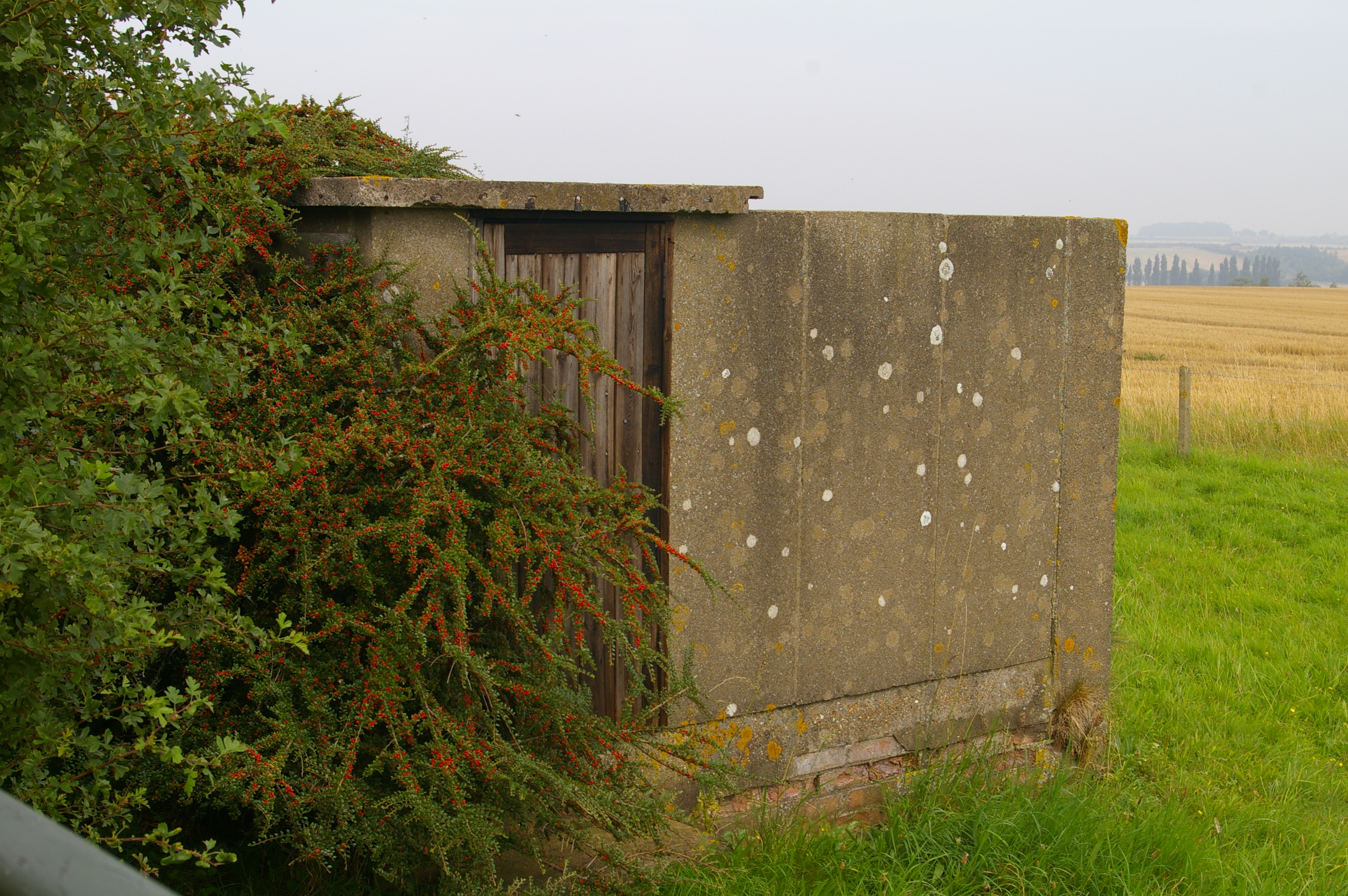
An Orlit post at Dersingham

The Royal Observer Corps Orlit Post is an observation post used by the Royal Observer Corps during the Cold War to recognise enemy aircraft. Many Orlit Posts can be found near ROC Monitoring Posts.

== History ==
Experience from World War II identified that there would be a need for increased protection from enemy aircraft if the United Kingdom were ever faced with the prospect of being at war again. Although the ROC was finding that aircraft monitoring was becoming increasingly difficult to plot with the development of new faster aircraft, new aircraft monitoring posts were developed to assist observers to monitor aircraft.

The idea for these new posts originated in 1947, however it was only during 1951/52 as part of the programme to update the air defences through the Rotor Plan that more substantial buildings were built to offer at least some level of protection from the elements or attack. Although some of these new structures were built of brick, many sites received pre-cast concrete panelled structures known as "Orlit" posts, after the manufacturers of the structures Messrs Orlit Ltd.

These Orlit structures were split into two sections. The entrance door led into the smaller roofed section which was used as a shelter and store with a sliding door into the open section which housed the Post Instrument and chart on top of a wooden mounting. Two types of Orlit posts existed, the Orlit 'A' was at ground level and the Orlit 'B' was raised 6 ft on four legs with a ladder for access.

== See also ==
- Commandant Royal Observer Corps
- Aircraft recognition
- Operational instruments of the Royal Observer Corps
  - AWDREY
  - Bomb Power Indicator
  - Ground Zero Indicator
  - Fixed Survey Meter
- United Kingdom Warning and Monitoring Organisation
- Four-minute warning
- Royal Observer Corps Medal
- Skywatch march
- RAF Bentley Priory
- Aircraft Identity Corps (Canada)
- Volunteer Air Observers Corps (Australia)
- Ground Observer Corps (USA)
- Civil Air Patrol (USA)
- List of ROC Group Headquarters and UKWMO Sector controls
  - List of Royal Observer Corps / United Kingdom Warning and Monitoring Organisation Posts (A-E)
  - List of Royal Observer Corps / United Kingdom Warning and Monitoring Organisation Posts (F-K)
  - List of Royal Observer Corps / United Kingdom Warning and Monitoring Organisation Posts (L-P)
  - List of Royal Observer Corps / United Kingdom Warning and Monitoring Organisation Posts (Q-Z)
