= United Kingdom Warning and Monitoring Organisation =

UK government agency (1957–1992)

- UKWMO Emblem-of-Arms

Department overview
- Formed: 1957
- Dissolved: 1992
- Jurisdiction: United Kingdom
- Headquarters: Cowley Barracks, James Wolfe Road, Cowley, Oxfordshire (Co-located with HQ 3 Group Royal Observer Corps)
- Annual budget: £4 million per annum (in 1990) including Royal Observer Corps running costs
- Department executive: Roy Cooke, Director UKWMO

Footnotes
- Funded by F6 Emergency Planning Division of the Home Office.

The United Kingdom Warning and Monitoring Organisation (UKWMO) was a British civilian organisation operating to provide UK military and civilian authorities with data on nuclear explosions and forecasts of fallout across the country in the event of nuclear war.

The UKWMO was established in 1957 and funded by the Home Office and used its own premises which were mainly staffed by Royal Observer Corps (ROC) uniformed full-time and volunteer personnel as the fieldforce. The ROC was administered by the Ministry of Defence but mainly funded by the Home Office. The only time the combined organisations were on high alert in the Cold War was during Cuban Missile Crisis in October and November 1962. The organisation was wound up and disbanded in November 1992 following a review prompted by the government's Options for Change report.

Its emblem-of-arms was a pair of classic hunting horns crossing each other, pointed upwards, with the enscrolled motto "Sound An Alarm", a title also used for the latter of two contemporary public information films (the earlier one was called "Hole in the Ground"). Members of the UKWMO qualified for the Civil Defence Medal for fifteen years continuous years service, with a bar for each subsequent twelve years.

== The task ==
The United Kingdom Warning and Monitoring Organisation had five main functions in the event of nuclear war. These were:

1. Warning the public of any air attack.
2. Providing confirmation of nuclear strike.
3. Warning the public of the approach of radioactive fall-out.
4. Supplying the civilian and military authorities in the United Kingdom and neighbouring countries in NATO with details of nuclear bursts and with a scientific assessment of the path and intensity of fall-out
5. Provision of a post-attack meteorological service

== Operational organisation ==
=== Professional full-time staff ===
Headquarters UKWMO was located in a converted barracks building at Cowley Barracks in Cowley, Oxfordshire, and was headed by a Director and Deputy Director supported by a small administrative staff. Five professional Sector Controllers and five Assistant Sector Controllers were co-located at the five UKWMO Sector Controls.

=== Sparetime volunteers ===
At each of the twenty five UKWMO group controls the UKWMO was represented by volunteer and specially trained members. In the event of war the senior UKWMO volunteer present would command the group as Group Controller. Assessing the nuclear burst and fallout information and data provided by the ROC was a team of ten or more Warning Officers led by a Chief Warning Officer.

The members of the warning team were recruited from mainly local secondary school science teachers, or commercial engineers and technicians with a scientific education and background. They trained every two weeks from printed materials provided by the Home Office scientific branch and through lectures or practical training organised by the Assistant Sector Controller who was the area UKWMO training officer.

=== During operations ===
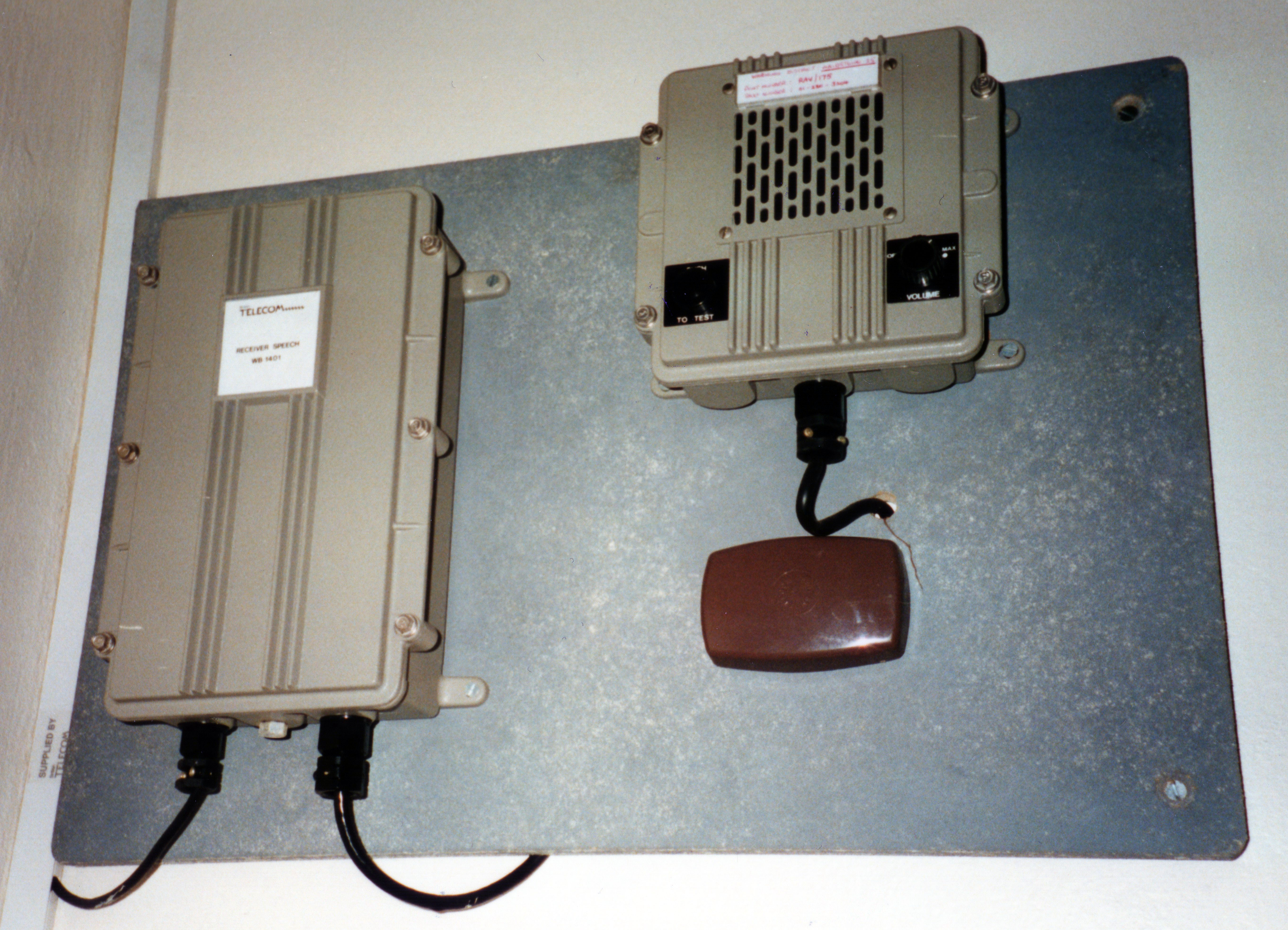
WB1401 warning receiver in a former local authority control centre

The Director UKWMO was located at the United Kingdom Regional Air Operations Command (UK RAOC) at RAF Booker tasked with instigating the four-minute warning. The Deputy Director would be located at a standby UK RAOC, described at the time as being "elsewhere in the UK". It's since been revealed as being at Goosnargh, Lancashire, within the UKWMO Western Sector nuclear bunker. Warnings were instantly distributed around the country by the Warning Broadcast System via 250 Carrier Control Points located at major police headquarters and 17,000 WB400 (later WB1400) carrier receivers in armed forces headquarters, hospitals, post offices, ROC posts and private homes in remote rural areas where hand-operated sirens replaced the power sirens in the urban towns.

Sparetime warning team members were activated, through a rehearsed transition to war telephone calling card procedure, by wholetime Royal Observer Corps officers located at the twenty five group headquarters. UKWMO communications used private wires (PWs) (permanently available and with greater protection) or emergency circuits (ECs) (switched for exercises or in the event of an emergency) for data and voice with a radio back up option. Some other UKWMO telephone lines and the warning broadcast system were protected by the Post Office's Telephone Preference Scheme that kept the lines active while the general public's system could be progressively attenuated under wartime regulations.

=== Specialist training ===
Both wholetime and sparetime UKWMO personnel undertook specialist residential training at the Emergency Planning College, The Hawkhills, Easingwold, Yorkshire. Several major war simulation exercises were held each year 2 x WARMON (Warning and Monitoring) one day UK exercises and the two-day INTEX (International exercise) along with other NATO countries.

Four times a year minor and limited exercises called POSTEX were held on a stop – start basis across three evenings of a week, Monday to Wednesday. Realistic simulation material was provided for realtime simulations of a nuclear attack.

Approximately every four or five years each group was subjected to a "no notice" and in depth assessment similar to an RAF "TACEVAL" or Tactical Evaluation, where a mixed team of UKWMO and ROC full-time staff would appear and evaluate all aspects of the group's planning and operations under realistic wartime conditions over a period of 48 hours.

=== Modernisation ===
A large amount of work was completed from the mid 1980s to bring the UKWMO up to date. Modern detection instruments were provided to the ROC together with back up detectors at certain Sector or Group Controls known as Atomic Weapons Detection Recognition and Estimation of Yield (AWDREY) equipment. Updated warning equipment was installed in most government buildings, nuclear bunkers, armed forces HQs, police and fire stations and private houses in remote areas. Major police stations were used as the area control points for power operated sirens, so these were equipped with new WB1400 carrier control warning equipment. If a warning was received then the police could operate the sirens via remote control, the carrier warning signal did not automatically operate the warning sirens (a few of which were those used in the Second World War). Many of the sirens are still in operation in coastal areas and are now used for emergency flood warning. Between 1985 and 1990 all communications links used by the warning system, the UKWMO and the ROC were upgraded and hardened against the effects of electromagnetic pulse damage. Point-to-point SX2000 automated telephone exchanges were installed in the UKWMO Sector and Group Controls and old fashioned telegraph equipment was replaced with modern computerised message switching equipment.

=== Air raid warnings ===
Ballistic missile air raid warnings for the UK would have originated from the shared UK/USA Ballistic Missile Early Warning System in England, (the site is now upgraded and still operational at RAF Fylingdales, on the North York Moors) and disseminated through UKRAOC to the carrier warning system. This was commonly, and slightly erroneously, known as the four-minute warning.

=== Instrumentation ===
ROC post observers in an underground monitoring post during a Cold War training exercise. The BPI dial can be seen in the background with a teletalk, FSM radiac instrument and a WB400 receiver on the desk

==== For the detection of nuclear bursts ====
- "Atomic Weapons Detection Recognition and Estimation of Yield", known as "AWDREY", was a desk-mounted automatic instrument, located at certain UKWMO controls, that detected nuclear explosions and indicated the estimated size in megatons. Operating by measuring the level of electromagnetic pulse (EMP), the instruments were tested daily by wholetime ROC officers and regularly reacted to the EMP from lightning strikes during thunderstorms. AWDREY was designed and built by the Atomic Weapons Establishment at Aldermaston and tested for performance and accuracy on a real nuclear explosion at the 1957 Kiritimati (or Christmas Island) nuclear bomb test (after being mounted on board a ship). Reports following a reading on AWDREY were prefixed with the codeword "Tocsin Bang".
- The "Bomb Power Indicator" or "BPI" consisted of a peak overpressure gauge with a dial that would register when the pressure wave from a nuclear explosion passed over the post. When related to the distance of the explosion from the post this pressure would indicate the power of the explosion. Reports following a reading on the BPI were preceded by the codeword "Tocsin".
- The "Ground Zero Indicator", or "GZI" or shadowgraph, consisted of four horizontally mounted cardinal compass point pinhole cameras within a metal drum; each "camera" contained a sheet of photosensitive paper on which were printed horizontal and vertical calibration lines. The flash from a nuclear explosion would produce a mark on one or two of the papers within the drum. The position of the mark enabled the bearing and height of the burst to be estimated. With triangulation between neighbouring posts these readings would give an accurate height and position. The altitude of the explosion was important because a ground or near-ground burst would produce radioactive fallout, whereas an air burst would produce only short-distance and short-lived initial radiation (but no fallout). Reports following a reading on the GZI were preceded by the codeword "Nuclear Burst".

==== For the measurement of ionising radiation ====
- The "Radiac Survey Meter No 2" or "RSM" was a 1955-meter which counted the particles produced by radioactive decay. This meter suffered from a number of disadvantages: it required three different types of obsolete batteries, it also contained delicate valves that were prone to failure and it had to be operated from outside the protection of the post. These were favoured as they had been tested on fallout in Australia after the Operation Buffalo nuclear tests, and remained in use until 1982 by commissioning a manufacturer to regularly produce special production runs of the obsolete batteries. Within the ROC the RSM was superseded in 1958 by the FSM and the RSM retained only for post-attack mobile monitoring missions.
- The "Fixed Survey Meter" or "FSM" introduced in 1958, could be operated from within the post with a cable leading to the detector mounted externally and protected by a polycarbonate dome. The FSM used the same obsolete high-voltage batteries as the RSM. In 1985 this instrument was replaced by the "PDRM 82(F)".
- The "PDRM82" or Portable Dose Rate Meter and the desktop-fixed PDRM 82(F) version of the same meter, that were manufactured by Plessey and introduced during the 1980s, gave more accurate readings and used standard C-cell torch batteries that lasted many times longer, up to 400 hours of operation. The compact and robust instruments were housed in sturdy orange-coloured polycarbonate cases and had clear liquid crystal displays.
- The "Dosimeter" pocket meters were issued to individual observers for measuring their personal levels of radiation absorption during operations. Three different grades of dosimeter were used, depending on ambient radiation levels. The original hand-wound and temperamental dosimeter charging units were replaced during the 1980s by battery-operated automatic charging units.

== Civil Defence Medal ==
The Civil Defence Medal was instituted March 1961 and awarded for 15 years service in a variety of different organisations including; Auxiliary Fire Service, National Hospital Service Reserve, Civil Defence Corps and the United Kingdom Warning and Monitoring Organisation.

== Disbanded ==
UKWMO training effectively ceased in the summer of 1991 after the Home Secretary's stand-down announcement. When the UKWMO was disbanded, and the ROC stood down, the government referred to "possible future developments and improvements in automated nuclear explosion and fallout detection from remote sensors", but it is unlikely that any such system has yet to be developed or installed. Civil nuclear defence since 1992 has been devolved to UK local authorities as an addition to their routine emergency planning responsibilities and under direction of the government's Civil Contingencies Secretariat but the four-minute warning air raid alert system no longer operates.

== See also ==
- Four-minute warning
- List of ROC Group Headquarters and UKWMO Sector controls
- List of Royal Observer Corps / United Kingdom Warning and Monitoring Organisation Posts (A-E)
- List of Royal Observer Corps / United Kingdom Warning and Monitoring Organisation Posts (F-K)
- List of Royal Observer Corps / United Kingdom Warning and Monitoring Organisation Posts (L-P)
- List of Royal Observer Corps / United Kingdom Warning and Monitoring Organisation Posts (Q-Z)
- Royal Observer Corps monitoring post
- Operational instruments of the Royal Observer Corps
- AWDREY
- Bomb Power Indicator
- Ground Zero Indicator
- Fixed Survey Meter
