= Royal Observer Corps monitoring post =

British military installation

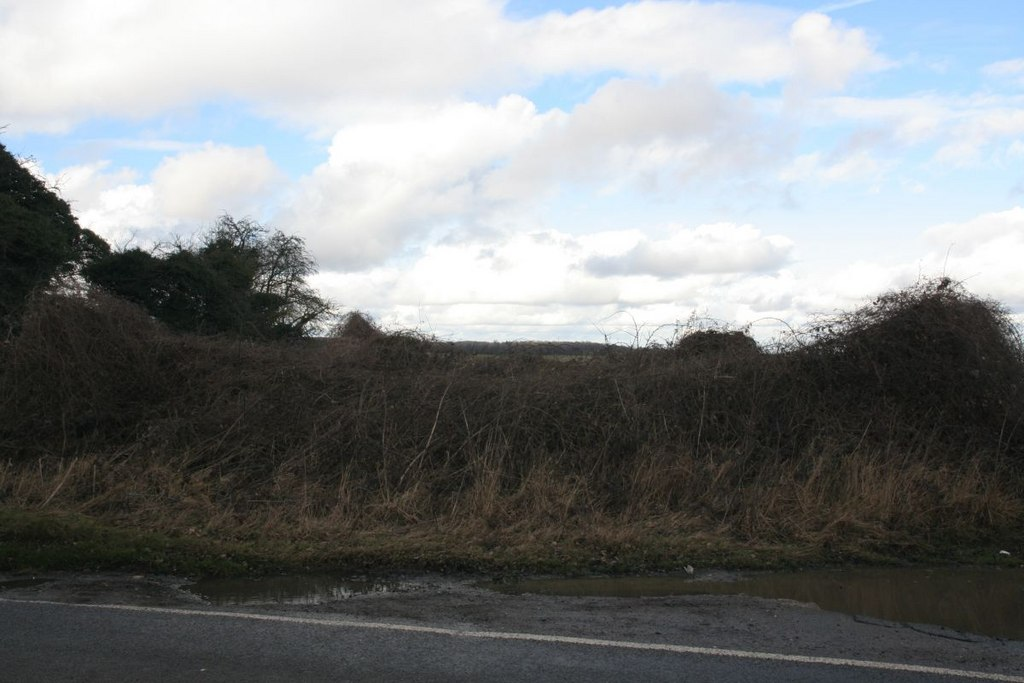
The site of the ROC post near Streatley, Berkshire.

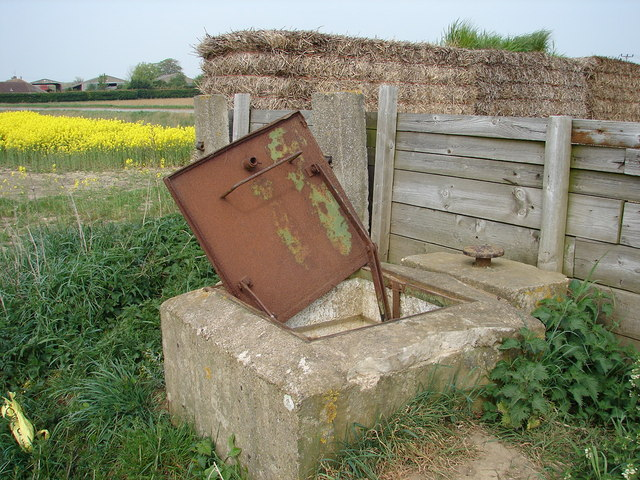
The site of the ROC post near Ruskington, Lincolnshire

Royal Observer Corps monitoring posts are underground structures all over the United Kingdom, constructed as a result of the Royal Observer Corps' nuclear reporting role and operated by volunteers during the Cold War between 1955 and 1991.

In all but a very few instances, the posts were built to a standard design consisting of a 14 foot (4.3 m)-deep access shaft, a toilet/store and a monitoring room. The most unusual post was the non-standard one constructed in a cellar within Windsor Castle.

Almost half of the total number of posts were closed in 1968 during a reorganization and major contraction of the ROC. Several others closed over the next 40 years as a result of structural difficulties, e.g. persistent flooding, or regular vandalism. The remainder of the posts were closed in 1991 when the majority of the ROC was stood down following the break-up of the Communist Bloc. Many have been demolished or adapted to other uses, but the majority still exist, although in a derelict condition.

== Construction ==
The first prototype post was built at Farnham, Surrey, in 1956 and on 29/30 September of that year a trial was conducted to ascertain the usefulness of the underground posts. Of the two crews of four personnel engaged in staffing the post during this trial, the second group of four, two ROC and two Home Office Scientific Advisory Branch, were sealed inside with rations bedding and barracks equipment. With a few minor changes, mainly to the hatch and air ventilation louvers, the posts were built as per the prototype. The protection provided by the concrete roof and compacted earth mounded above the post was estimated to reduce any external nuclear radiation by a factor of 1,500:1.

Construction of the original 1,563 posts was overseen by the Air Ministry Works Department and the ROC and undertaken by local contractors. Once a site was chosen (usually the site of an aircraft observation post), a hole approximately 9 feet deep was excavated. Within this hole, a monocoque structure was cast using reinforced concrete with a floor about twelve inches thick, walls about seven inches thick and a roof about eight inches thick. The whole structure was then bitumen' 'tanked' for waterproofing purposes. Soil was compacted over the structure to form a mound leaving the access shaft, doubling as an airshaft, protruding above ground. At the opposite end of the building, a further air shaft was formed. Two metal pipes, one 5 inches in diameter and one 1 inch in diameter, protruded from the roof and above the four-foot mound to be used with operational instruments. The air vents were covered by downward-sloping louvers above ground and sliding metal shutters below ground to control air flow during contamination by radioactive fallout.

The Home Office wanted 100 posts built in the first year (1957) and 250 a year thereafter. By mid-1958, only 94 posts had been handed over to the ROC with 110 under construction. The cost of building the underground posts was approximately £1000, but rose to nearer £8000 in some instances.

== Restorations ==
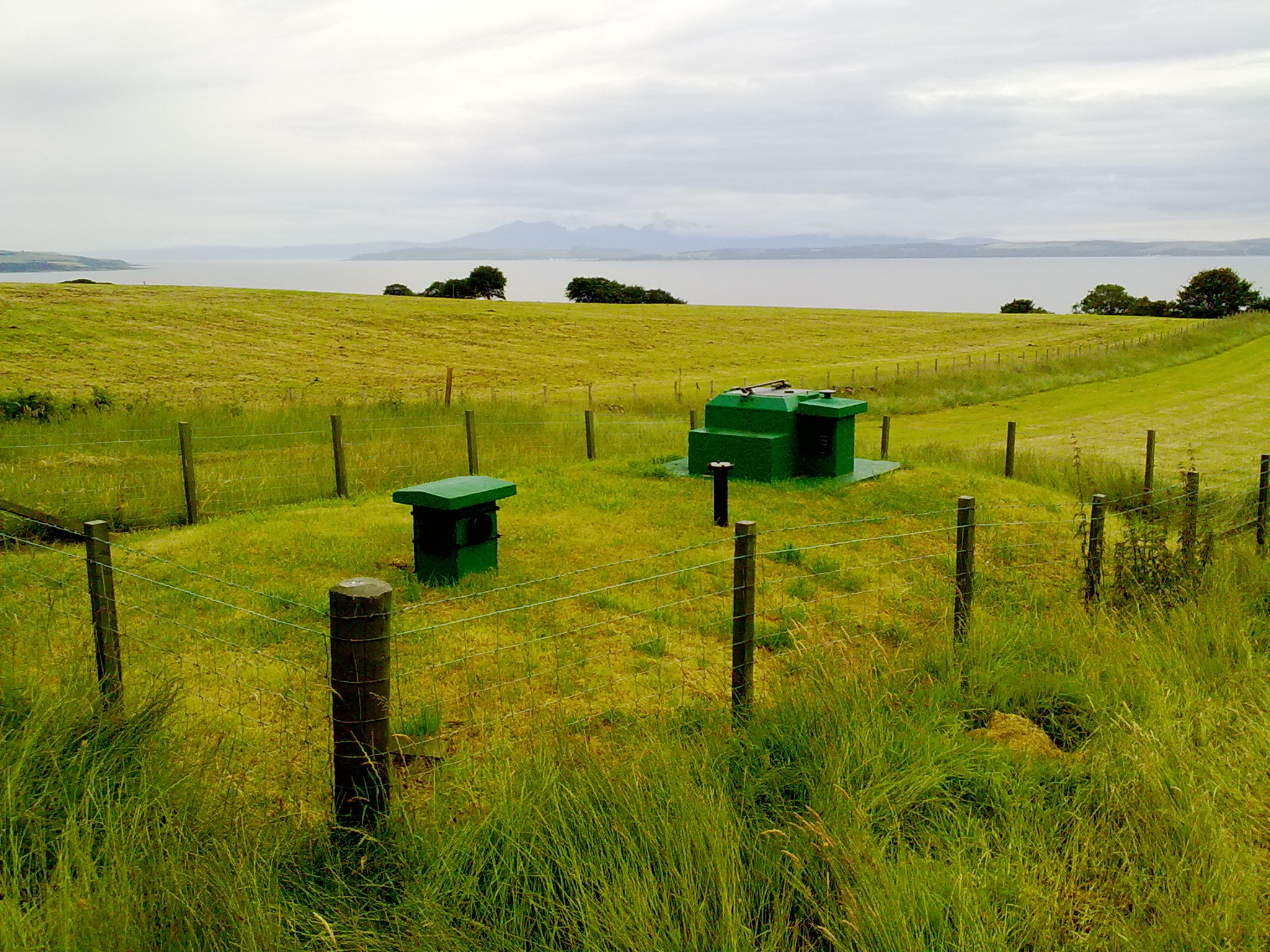
Above ground view of a monitoring post; Skelmorlie ROC post has been restored

Today, most posts lie derelict and abandoned. Approximately half of the posts built have been demolished, either on stand down by the ROC or by private owners in subsequent years. One post, in York, has been incorporated into a house and forms a handy cellar.

A small number of posts have been purchased or leased and restored to show how they were used and usually opened as museums with guided tours by prior arrangement, these include; Skelmorlie (Scotland), Veryan (England), Castleton (England), Rushton Spencer (England), Broadway Tower (England), Portadown (Northern Ireland), Cuckfield (England), Arbroath (Scotland), Abernyte (Scotland). Several more are planned or are under development.

To date, only two former Group Control buildings have been restored and opened to the public. One is run by English Heritage the HQ 20 Group York, Shelley House at Acomb, York. The second is the Caledonian Sector Control in Dundee, run by 28 Group SCIO where it is possible to organise private tours.

== See also ==
- Commandant Royal Observer Corps
- Aircraft recognition
- Royal Observer Corps Orlit Post
- Operational instruments of the Royal Observer Corps
  - AWDREY
  - Bomb Power Indicator
  - Ground Zero Indicator
  - Fixed Survey Meter
- United Kingdom Warning and Monitoring Organisation
- Four-minute warning
- Royal Observer Corps Medal
- Skywatch march
- RAF Bentley Priory
- Aircraft Identity Corps (Canada)
- Volunteer Air Observers Corps (Australia)
- Ground Observer Corps (USA)
- Civil Air Patrol (USA)
- List of ROC Group Headquarters and UKWMO Sector controls
  - List of Royal Observer Corps / United Kingdom Warning and Monitoring Organisation Posts (A-E)
  - List of Royal Observer Corps / United Kingdom Warning and Monitoring Organisation Posts (F-K)
  - List of Royal Observer Corps / United Kingdom Warning and Monitoring Organisation Posts (L-P)
  - List of Royal Observer Corps / United Kingdom Warning and Monitoring Organisation Posts (Q-Z)
