= ROC Post Speke =

Nuclear monitoring post in England

Coordinates: 53°20′35″N 2°52′14″W

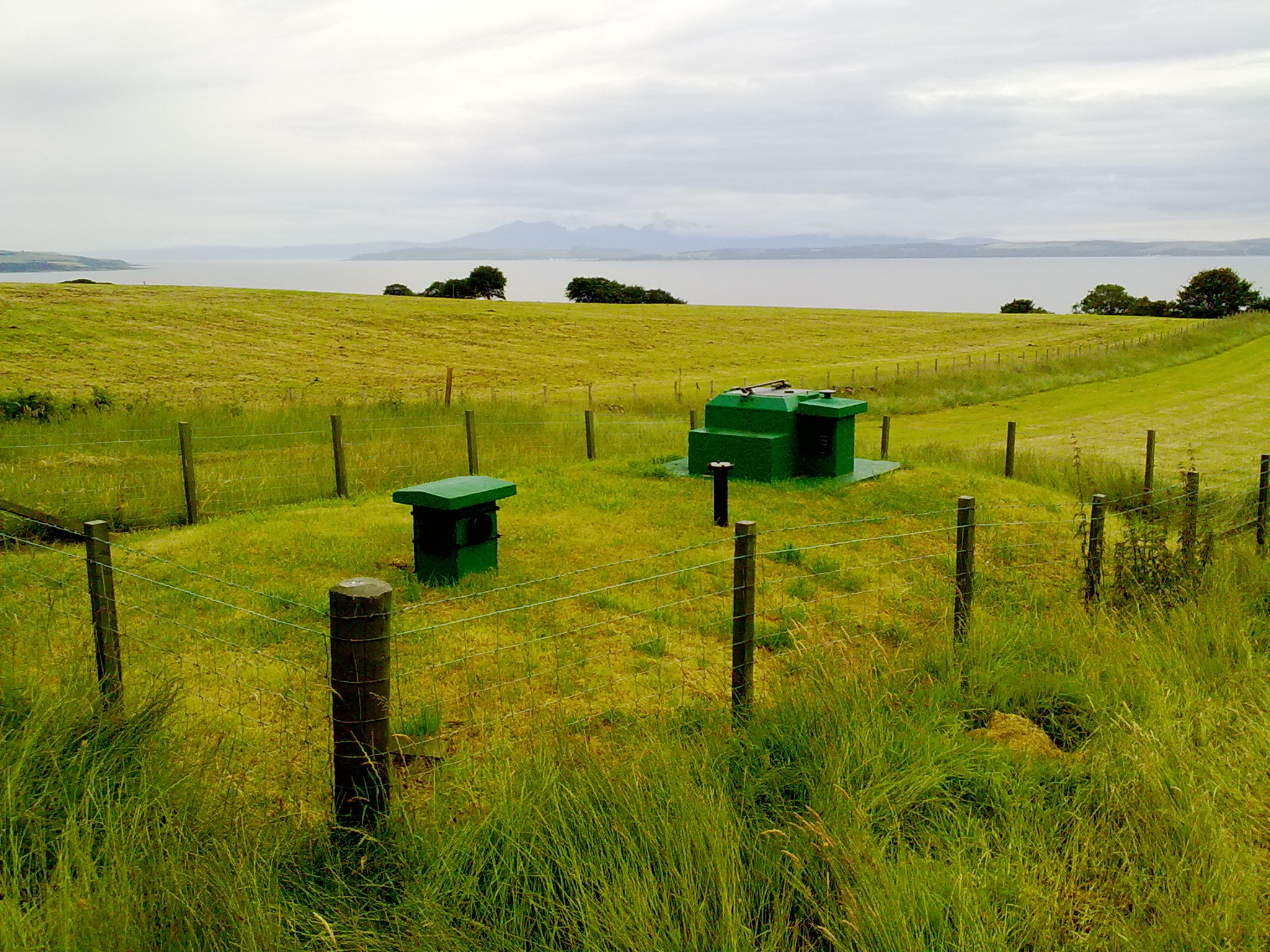
Above ground view of a monitoring post

ROC Post Speke is a nuclear monitoring post in Speke, Liverpool built during the Cold War. It was operational between 1959 and 1968. It has the distinction of being the only post of its type in Merseyside. As of 2012, plans to renovate the post were put under consideration as part of the RAF Speke museum project, with funds donated to Help for Heroes.

== Details ==
- Speke ROC Bunker
- WAB: SJ48
- Type: W
- Call Area: G
- Cashota Ref: G2462
- Locator: IO83NI
- Map ref: SJ142138326
- L24 8RB
