= Civil defense Geiger counters =

Hand-held radiation meter used in civil defense

Geiger counter is a colloquial name for any hand-held radiation measuring device in civil defense, but most civil defense devices were ion-chamber radiological survey meters capable of measuring only high levels of radiation that would be present after a major nuclear event.

Most Geiger and ion-chamber survey meters were issued by governmental civil defense organizations in several countries from the 1950s in the midst of the Cold War in an effort to help prepare citizens for a nuclear attack.

== US models ==
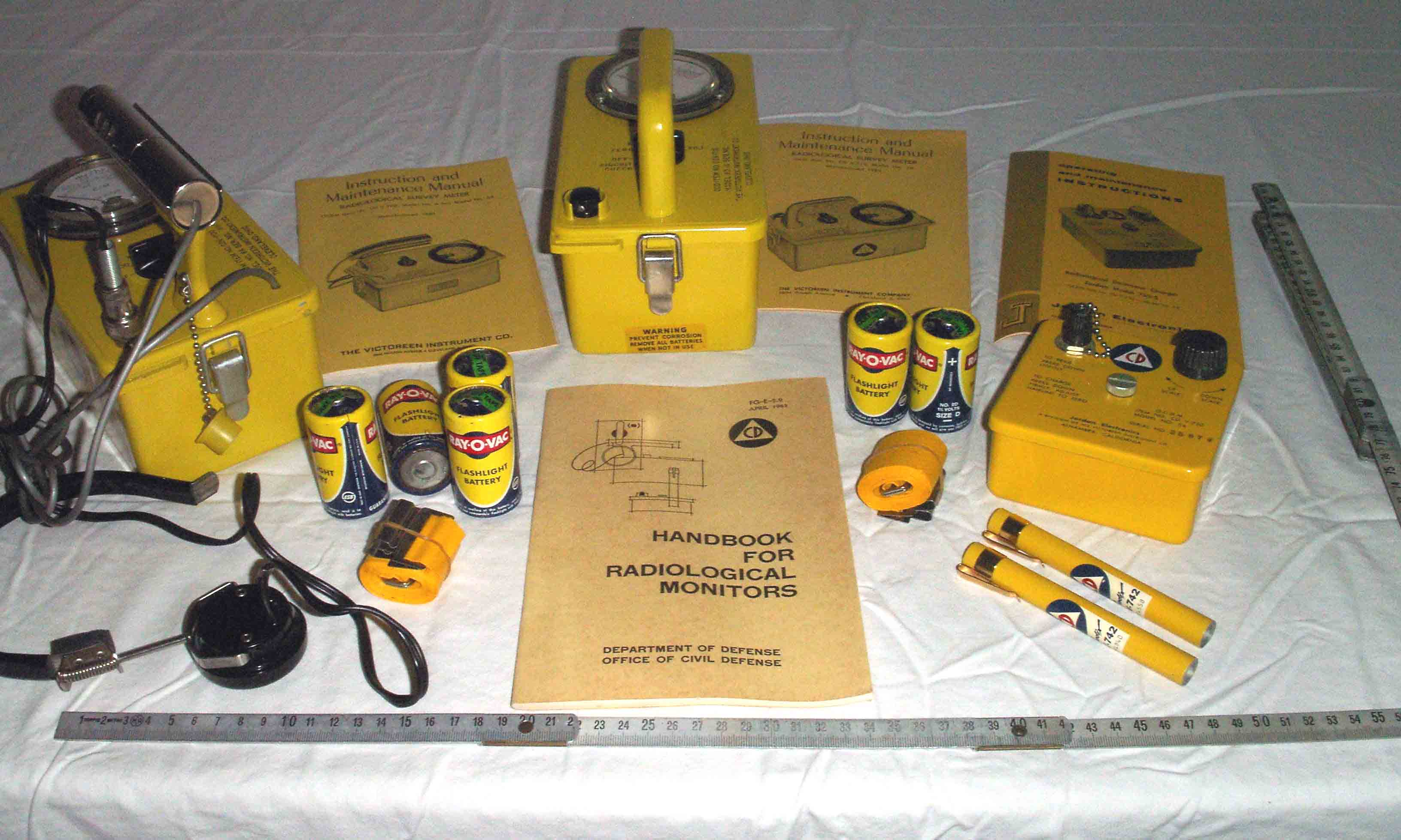
Victoreen Civil Defense V-777-1 shelter radiation detection kit overview

CD Counters came in a variety of different models, each with specific capabilities. Each of these models has an analog meter from 1 to 5, with 1/10 tick marks. Thus, at X10, the meter reads from 1 to 50.

CD meters were produced by a number of different firms under contract. Victoreen, Lionel, Electro Neutronics, Nuclear Measurements, Chatham Electronics, International Pump and Machine Works, Universal Atomics, Anton Electronic Laboratories; Landers, Frary, & Clark; El Tronics, Jordan, and Nuclear Chicago are among the many manufacturers contracted. Regardless of producer, most counters exhibit the same basic physical characteristics, albeit with slight variations between some production runs: a yellow case with black knobs and meter bezels. Most US meters had a "CD" sticker on the side of the case.

== True Geiger counters ==
These are instruments which use the Geiger principle of detection.

=== Type CD V-700 ===
The CD V-700 is a Geiger counter employing a probe equipped with a Geiger–Müller tube manufactured by several companies under contract to US federal civil defense agencies in the 1950s and 1960s. This unit is quite sensitive and can be used to measure low levels of gamma radiation and detect beta radiation. In cases of high-radiation fields, the Geiger tube can saturate, causing the meter to read a very low level of radiation (close to 0 R/h) hence the necessity of the companion ion-chamber survey meters.

=== Type CD V-718 ===
The CD V-718 is a variation of the US military-issue AN/VDR-2 RADIAC made by Nuclear Research Corporation, located in the US State of New Jersey. The Federal Emergency Management Agency (FEMA) purchased a quantity of CD V-718s in the 1990s as a supplement to and partial replacement for the older meters in the inventory. The CD V-718 differs from the military AN/VDR-2 primarily by being painted bright "civil defense" yellow instead of olive green and being graduated in Röntgens rather than Grays. A much more modern and sophisticated device than earlier CD meters and equipped with a probe containing two Geiger-Mueller tubes of differing sensitivities, the CD V-718 can cover a much wider range of radiation levels than the earlier Geiger counters and ion-chamber survey meters combined (from .001mR/h to 10,000 R/h). As a result of its military heritage, the CD-V-718 is far more rugged than earlier CD meters, and can easily be mounted in vehicles.

== Ion-chamber survey meters ==
These are instruments using the ionisation chamber principle.

If the meter on any of the ion chamber devices is observed to respond at all to a radiation source, evacuation of the area should be considered. No legally exempt source of gamma radiation would be expected to cause any visible deflection of the meter on its most sensitive setting, so it might be assumed that such a radiation field could be dangerous. Such a meter would not be expected to detect the presence of radiation except the very high levels that might be found in the event of a nuclear weapon detonation or a major release of radioactive material as from a nuclear reactor meltdown. The CD V ion chamber units are now all approaching 50 years old at a minimum and that they contain parts that are sensitive to moisture, so relatively frequent calibration and inspection by an accredited and properly equipped facility is required to ensure reliable and accurate function.

=== Type CD V-710 ===
The CD V-710 was another high range survey meter, however, unlike the CD V-720, CD V-715, and CD V-717 its scale is only 0-50 R/H (0-0.5, 0–5, and 0-50) making it more of a mid range meter, however it is still far too high to respond to any exempt sources. The CD V-710 was made in 5 different versions from 1955 to at least 1958, the model 1 was produced by El-Tronics, models 2 and 4 were produced by Jorden Electronics, and models 3 and 5 were produced by Victoreen Instruments, models 1-3 were metal, and 4 and 5 were plastic. All versions of the CD V-710 use a combination of D batteries and obsolete 22.5 volt B batteries. By 1959, 170,750 were procured, however the model was ultimately superseded by the CD V-715 and in September 1985 FEMA issued instructions that remaining CD V-710s should be disposed of as obsolete.

=== Type CD V-715 ===
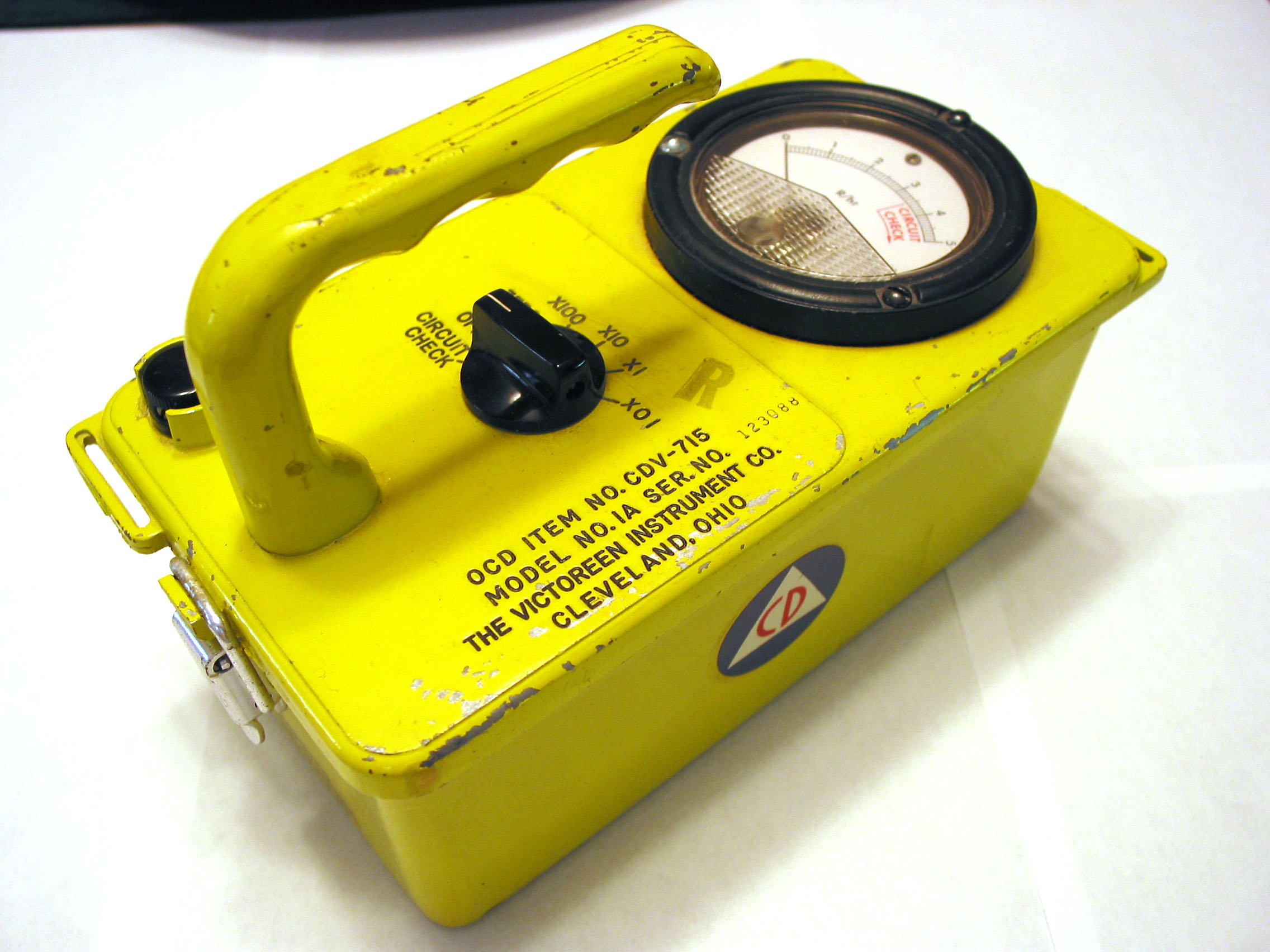
An example of the CD V-715 survey meter.

By far the most common US civil defense meter on the market today. This is a simple ion chamber radiological survey meter, specifically designed for high-radiation fields for which Geiger counters will give incorrect readings (see above). Survey meters do not read alpha or beta radiation. They work by radiation penetrating the case of the unit and the enclosed ionization chamber to produce a visible reading between 0.1 R/h and 500 R/h (× 0.1, × 1, × 10, and × 100 scales). The CDV-715 ion chamber controls a subminiature type 5886 tube, but no 22.5 volt batteries are necessary for the B circuit of this tube. A transistor oscillator coupled to a step-up transformer furnishes the necessary B current for the tube, with necessary rectifier diodes and filter capacitors. The entire unit is thus powered by a single 1.5 volt D cell.

=== Type CD V-717 ===
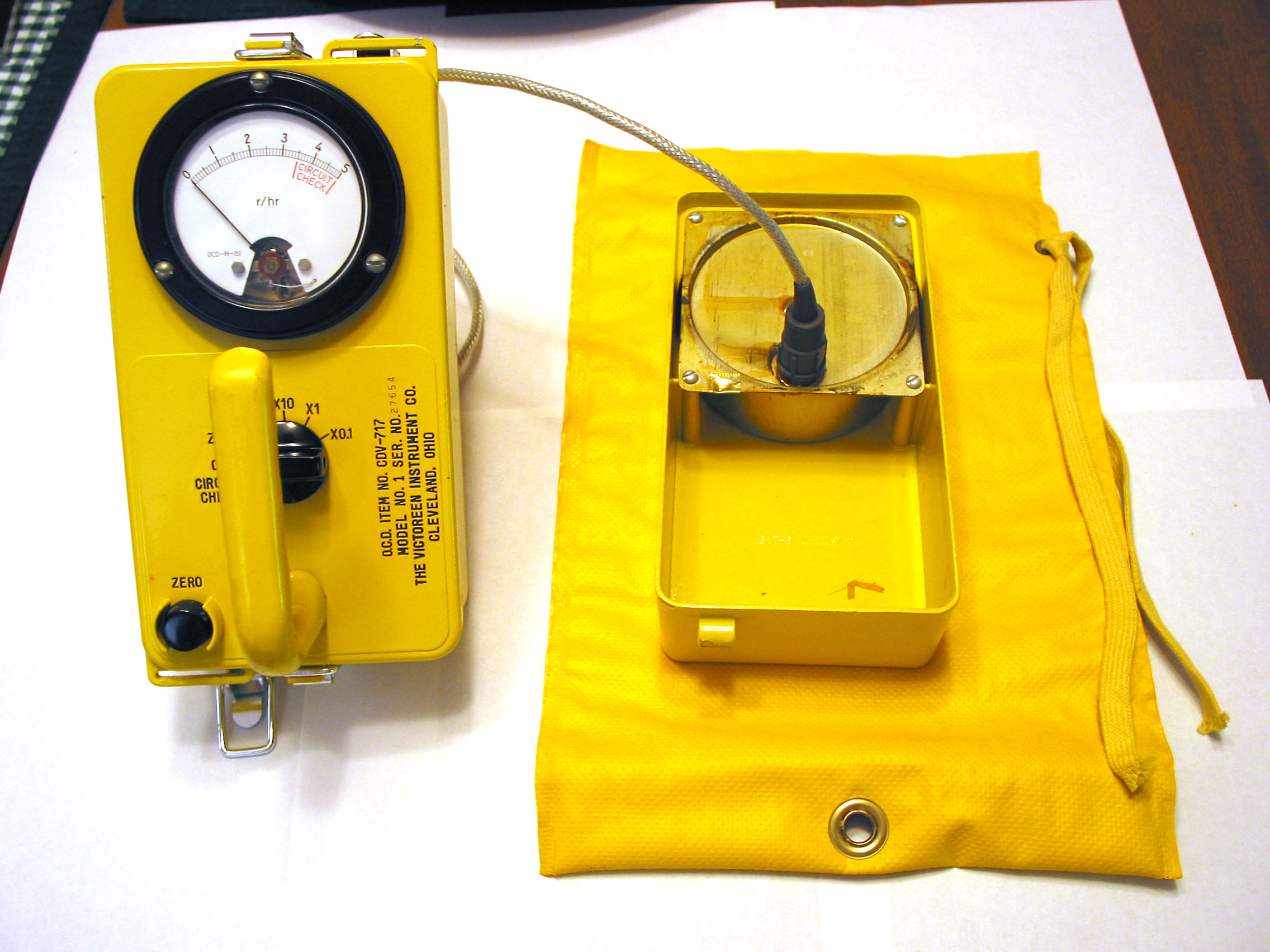
The Civil Defense CD V-717 with detachable ionization chamber deployed. Ionization chamber portion sits atop yellow anti-contamination bag.

Similar to the CD V-715, this unit reads from 0.1R/h to 500R/h. It is also a survey meter with an ionization chamber, however this unit's chamber is detachable for hanging outside your shelter or basement. When used, the ionization chamber would be inserted into a yellow anti-contamination bag, tied off, and hung outside a bomb shelter to measure radioactivity levels from a safe distance. An extension coaxial cord, typically stored inside the unit, is then run from the outdoor chamber to the indoor meter. The coaxial spool is used to prop the meter up for reading. This would allow those hiding to wait until outside radiation levels have fallen to a "safe" level before emerging. When using the extension cable, the accuracy of the meter can be slightly reduced to plus or minus 20%.

=== Type CD V-720 ===
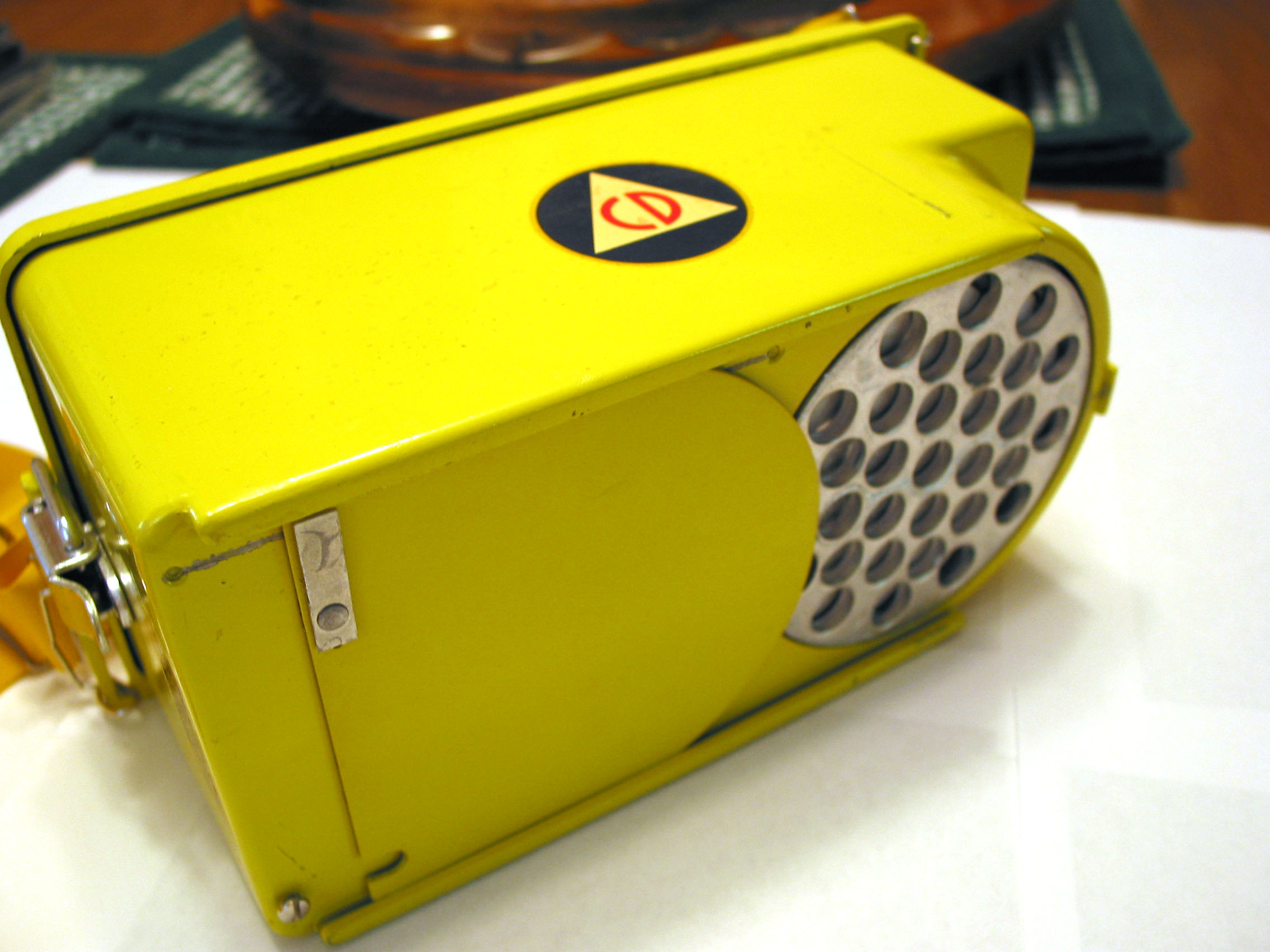
An example of the CD V-720 survey meter, turned upside down, showing the retractable beta shield.

Similar to the CD V-715, the CD V-720 is a fixed-position ionization chamber survey meter. Unlike any other survey meter, however, this unit has a movable beta shield on the bottom of the unit for detecting high levels of beta radiation. When slid to the open position, beta particles are allowed to directly penetrate the ionization chamber. With the beta shield closed, only gamma rays can penetrate both the shield and ionization chamber. This meter reads from 1 R/h to 500 R/h (×1, ×10 and ×100 scales). The CD V-720 was produced in 4 models (1, 2, 3, and 3A), Chatham made the model 1, Landeds Fray and Clark made the model 3 (along with Victoreen Instruments), and Victoreen Instruments made all other models. All but the Victoreen model 3 and model 3A used a combination of D and 22.5 volt B batteries, while the Victoreen models 3 and 3A just used 2 D batteries. By 1962 113,231 had been procured, but in September 1985 FEMA declared all models except the Victoreen model 3 and model 3A obsolete.

=== Kearny fallout meter ===
Another meter of note is the Kearny fallout meter. The plans for this meter were published in Appendix C of Nuclear War Survival Skills by Cresson Kearny from research performed at Oak Ridge National Laboratory. It was designed to be able to be constructed from household materials by someone with moderate mechanical ability on the eve of an attack. The plans are presented in a newspaper printable format.

== British civil defense instruments ==
The United States manufactured approximately 500,000 Geiger counters. Britain manufactured about 20,000 of each of its major types, and is second after the U.S. Some instruments were also manufactured by other countries in smaller numbers.

The American instruments dating from the Kennedy administration era were designed to use low voltage transistor electronics, and the batteries are still available today. However, most British civil defence instruments retained until 1982 or later were manufactured from 1953 to 1957, and required high voltage batteries which became obsolete after portable valve radios were superseded by transistor ones.

All British civil defence instruments were jointly designed by the Home Office and the Ministry of Defence, and were also a military issue.

=== Contamination Meter No. 1 ===
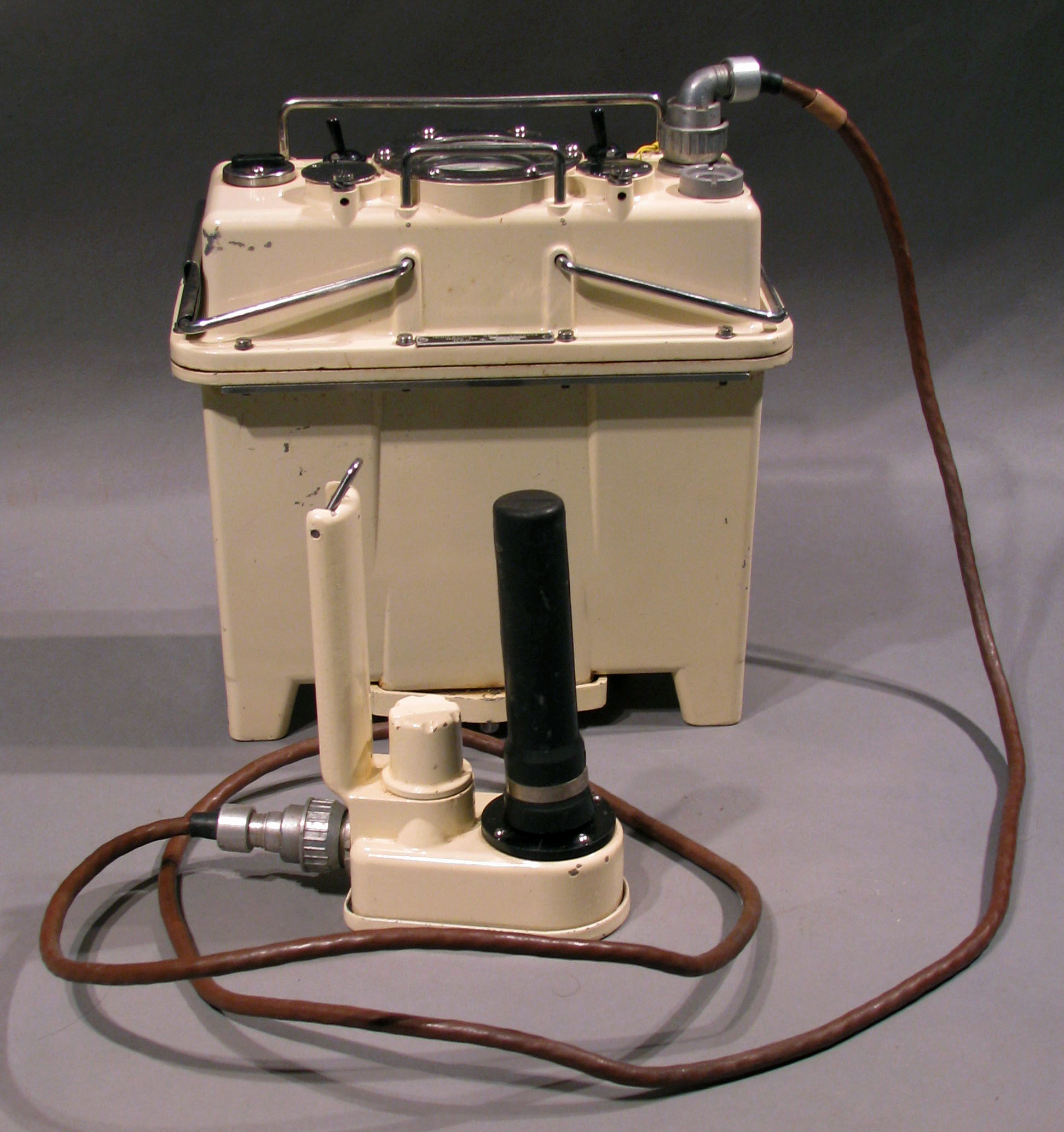
A British Meter, Contamination, No. 1 set, lacking headphones and haversack.

The first large scale British civil defence issue was the Geiger–Müller counter Meter, Contamination, No. 1 set — stock number "5CG0012", of 1953. It had 0–10 mR/hour range with external probe and headphones. This was designed to use two 150 volt batteries, although later they were fitted with a vibrator power pack which used four 1.35 volt mercury cells or, alternatively, a mains electricity power pack. Many of these units remained in service until the 1980s. There was also a Mk. 2 model which used rubber connectors and cable for the probe unit, compared to the Plessey connectors of the Mk.1.

This used cold-cathode valves and very high impedance circuitry throughout to extend useful battery life as long as possible with the existing technology.

=== Radiac Survey Meter ===
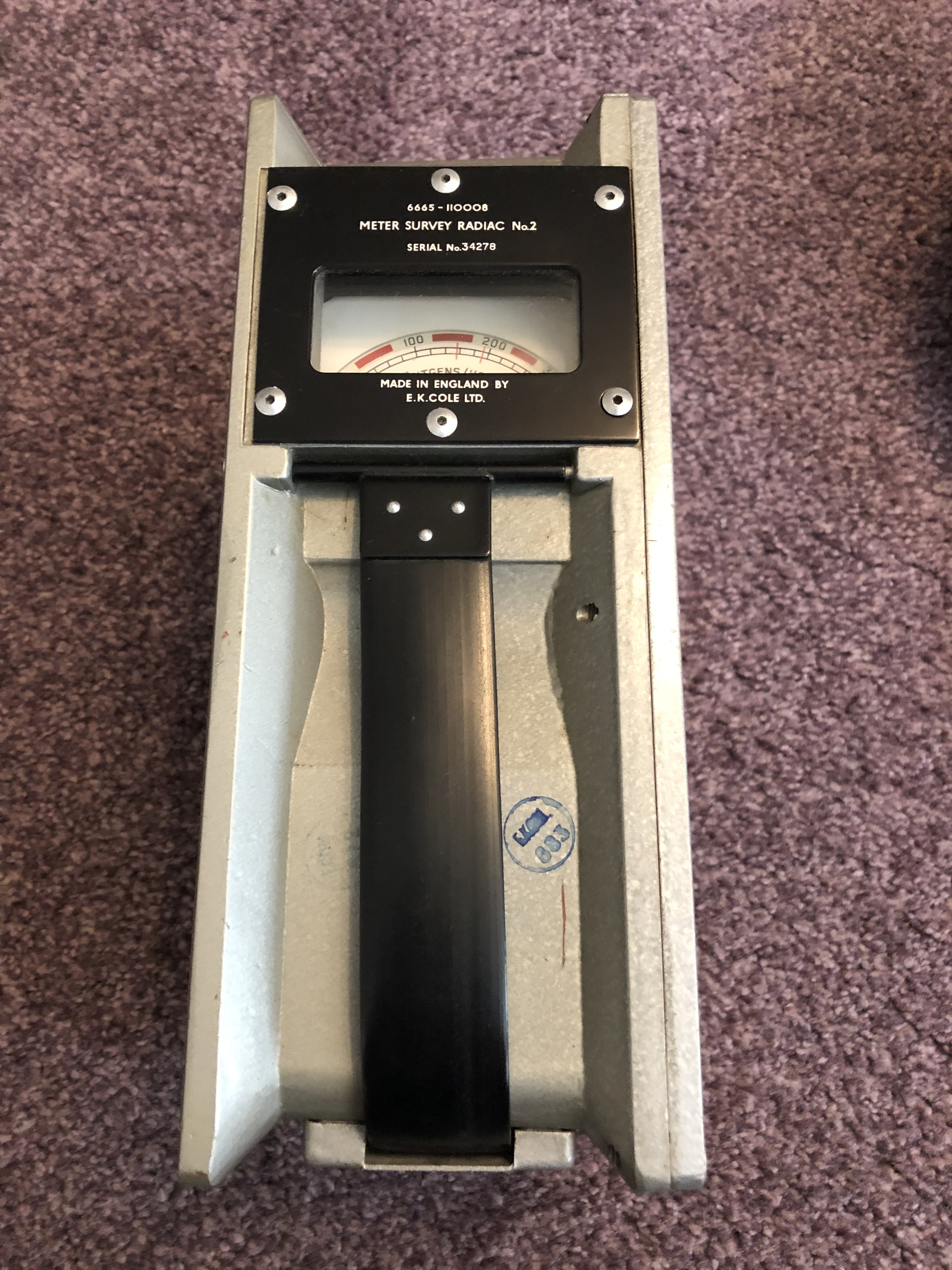
Radiac Survey Meter (RSM) No.2

The British "Radiac Survey Meter No. 2" dates from 1953 to 1956, and required now-obsolete 15 and 30 volt high voltage batteries and a 1.5 volt standard cell, the latter used to power the valve heater filaments and meter illumination bulb. There was also a training unit, which measured 0–300 mR/h, and ran on four 30 volt batteries plus one 1.5 V cell for the filaments. This meter used a large Geiger–Müller tube, as opposed to the ionisation chamber of the RSM No. 2.

These meters were favoured, as they had been tested on fallout in Australia after Operation Buffalo nuclear tests, and were retained until 1982 by commissioning a manufacturer to regularly produce special production runs of the obsolete batteries.

The UK's Royal Observer Corps (ROC) initially used the RSM No. 2 as its prime radiation detector until it was replaced by the specially designed "Fixed Survey Meter", which used the same obsolete high voltage batteries as the RSM. The ROC retained the RSM No. 2 for use during external "post-attack" mobile monitoring surveys.

=== PDRM82 ===
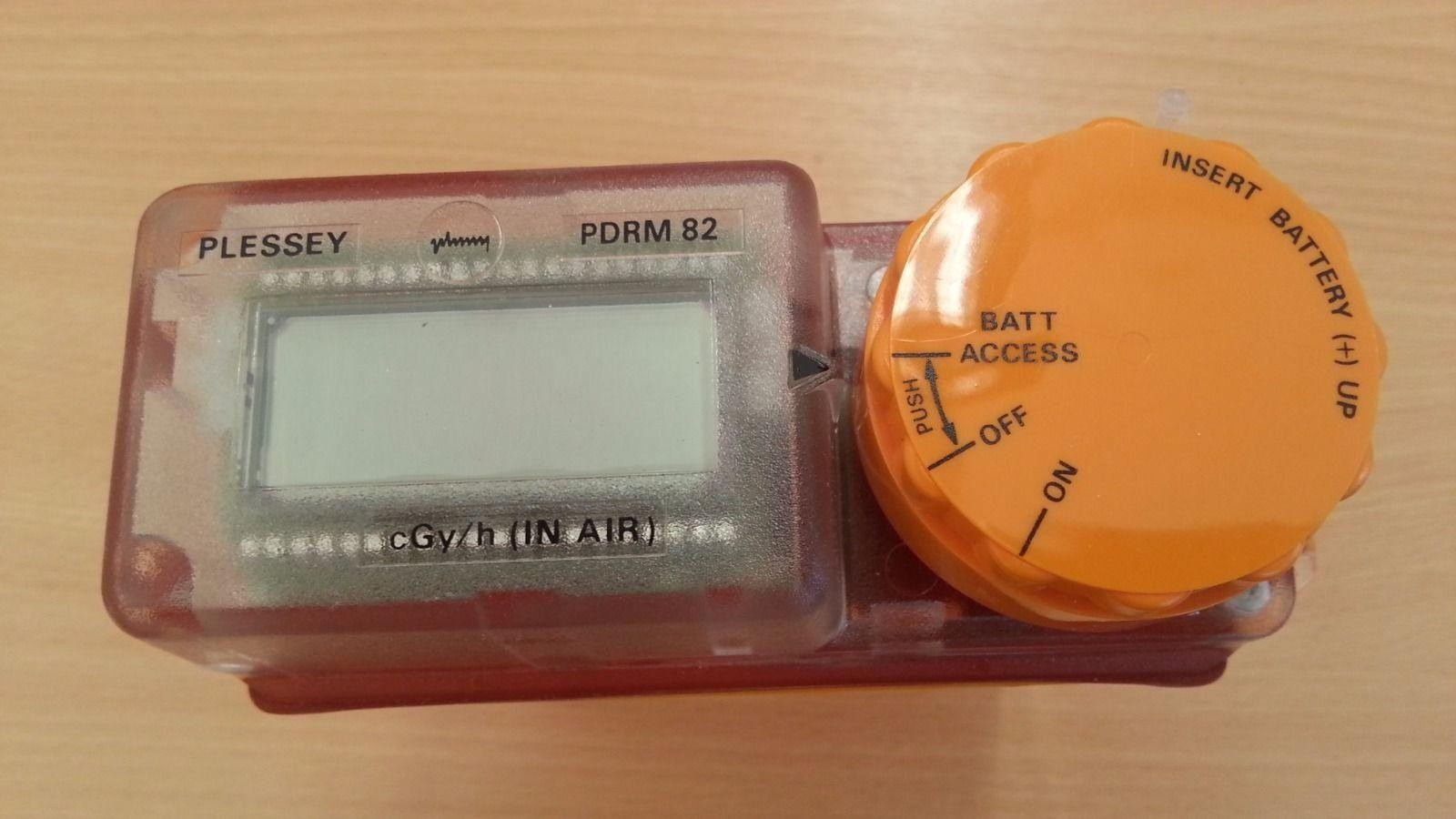
Plessey PDRM82

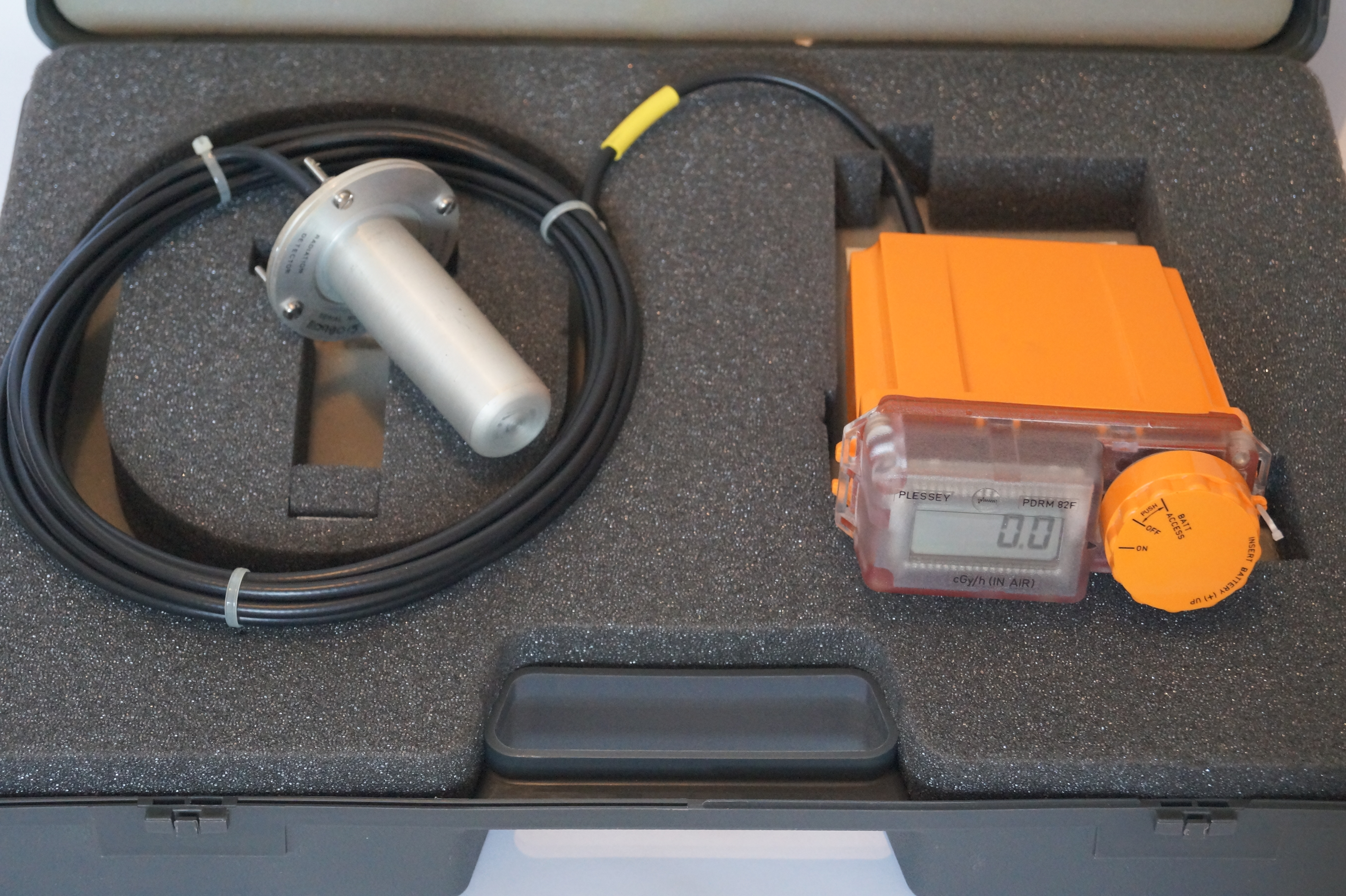
Plessey PDRM82F

Built by Plessey Controls, the Portable Dose Rate Meter (PDRM) 82 began to be issued in 1982 for civil defence, mainly the Royal Observer corps, with rollout completed in 1985. The model is lightweight and water resistant, with an LCD and a plastic case, along with miniature Geiger tube (shielded against beta particles), on a single, EMP-hardened, PCB. The PDRM was able to measure radiation dose rate in the range of 0.1 to 300 centiGrays. It was designed by Plessey to use three standard 1.5 volt cells, and is microprocessor controlled with digital readout. The instruments were contained in an orange polycarbonate case. It gave more accurate readings than previous models and due to the dry 'c'-cell torch batteries could be operated for up to 400 hours.

For use by the Royal Observer Corps, the instrument was also provided in the fixed version designated the PDRM82(F). The fixed version had an external coaxial socket mounted on its rear that accepted a cable from the above ground ionisation detector under a green polycarbonate dome. For training purposes, timed simulated readings could be fed to the meter from an EPROM.

=== Quartz fiber dosimeter chargers ===
The 1958–1959 "Quartz Fibre Dosimeter Chargers, No. 1 and 2" were retained until the early 1990s, as they incorporate a simple, handle-driven generator and do not require batteries at all. A later British civil defence dosimeter charger was developed by R. A. Stephen Ltd and manufactured from 1967 to 1988, and uses a single 1.5 volt cell. It is similar to American dosimeter chargers.

== See also ==
- Dosimeter
- Operational instruments of the Royal Observer Corps
- Royal Observer Corps
