= Operational instruments of the Royal Observer Corps =

ROC post observers in an underground monitoring post during a Cold War training exercise. The BPI dial can be seen in the background with a teletalk, FSM radiac instrument and a WB400 receiver on the desk.

The Royal Observer Corps (ROC) was a civil defence organisation operating in the United Kingdom between October 1925 and 31 December 1995, when the Corps' civilian volunteers were stood down. (ROC headquarters staff at RAF Bentley Priory stood down on 31 March 1996). Composed mainly of civilian spare-time volunteers, ROC personnel wore a Royal Air Force (RAF) style uniform and latterly came under the administrative control of RAF Strike Command and the operational control of the Home Office. Civilian volunteers were trained and administered by a small cadre of professional full-time officers under the command of the Commandant Royal Observer Corps; a serving RAF Air Commodore.

This sub article lists and describes the instruments used by the ROC in their nuclear detection and reporting role during the Cold War period.

== Initial detection of nuclear bursts on the UK ==
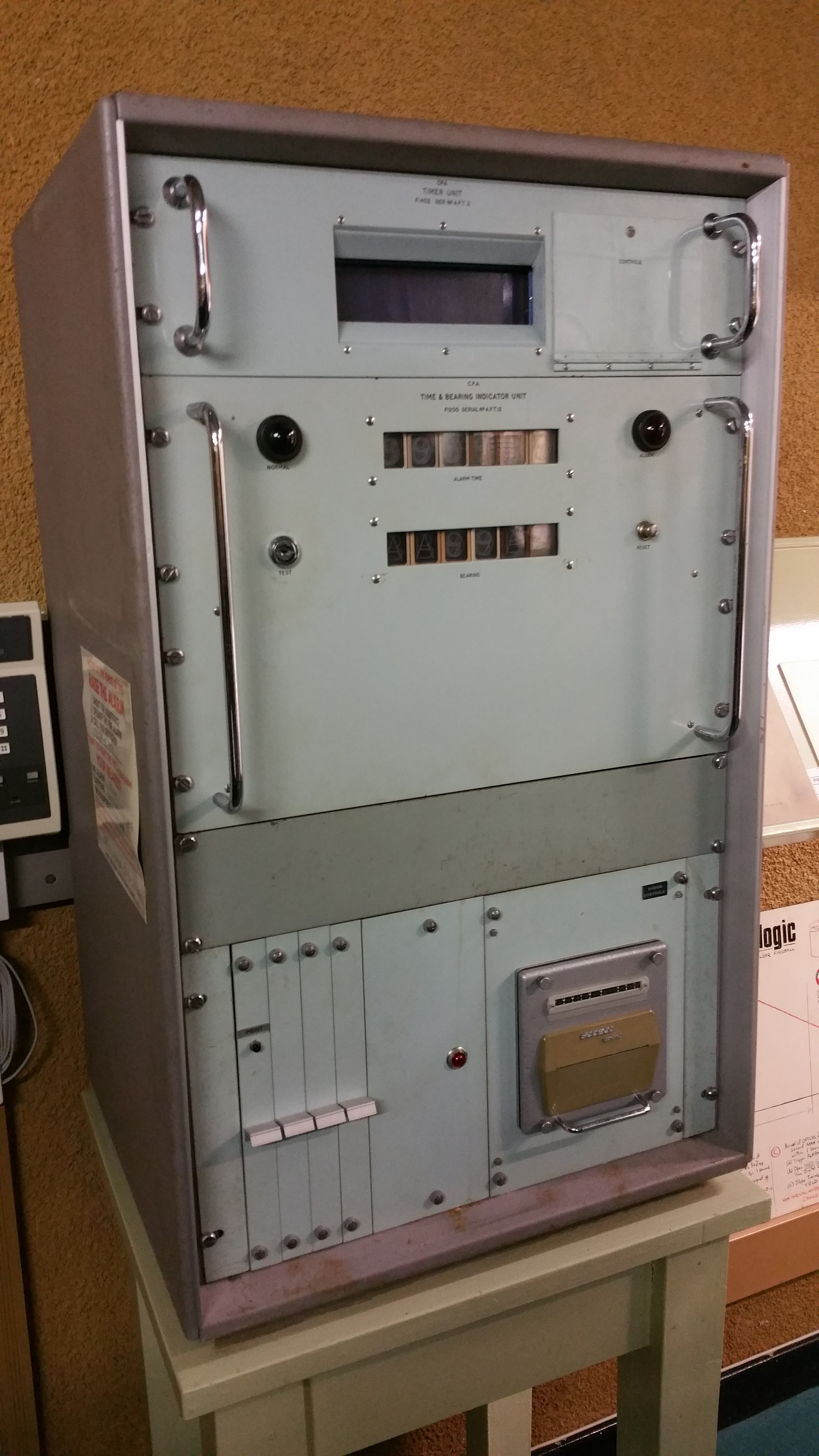
AWDREY Computer.

Atomic Weapons Detection Recognition and Estimation of Yield known as AWDREY was a desk mounted automatic instrument, located at controls, that detected nuclear explosions and indicated the estimated size in megatons. Operating by measuring the intense flashes emitted by a nuclear explosion, together with a unit known as DIADEM which measured Electromagnetic Pulse (EMP), the instruments were tested daily by wholetime ROC officers and regularly reacted to the EMP from lightning strikes during thunderstorms. AWDREY was designed and built by the Atomic Weapons Establishment at Aldermaston and tested for performance and accuracy on real nuclear explosions at the 1957 Kiritimati (or Christmas Island) nuclear bomb test (after being mounted on board a ship). Reports following a reading on AWDREY were prefixed with the codewords "Tocsin Bang".

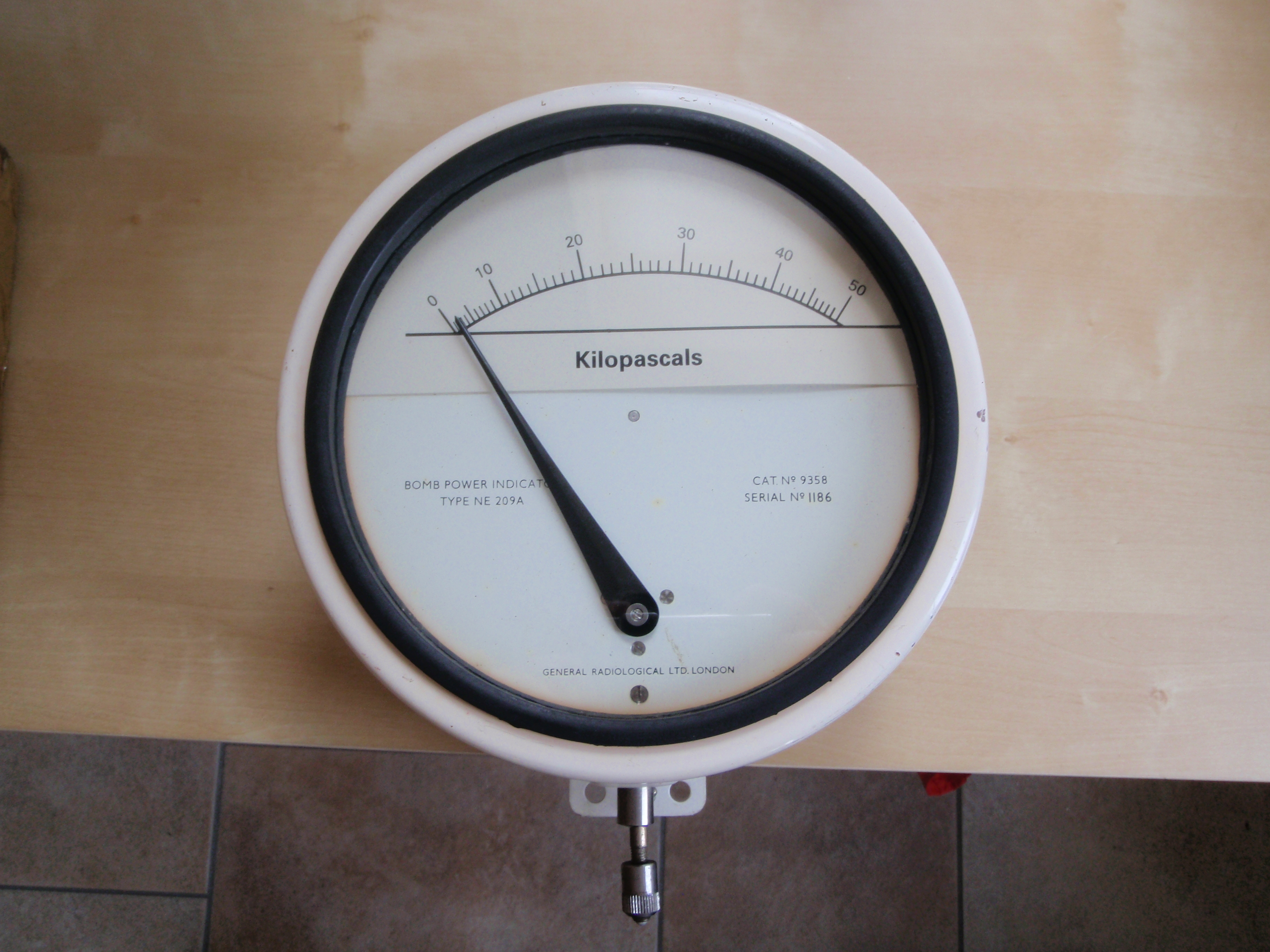
Bomb Power Indicator with ‘Kilopascal’ overlay. This was added in the 1970s to cover the original P.S.I scale which had been superseded.

The Bomb Power Indicator or BPI consisted of a peak overpressure gauge with a dial that would register when the pressure wave from a nuclear explosion passed over the post. When related to the distance of the explosion from the post this pressure would indicate the power of the explosion. Reports following a reading on the BPI were preceded by the codeword "Tocsin".

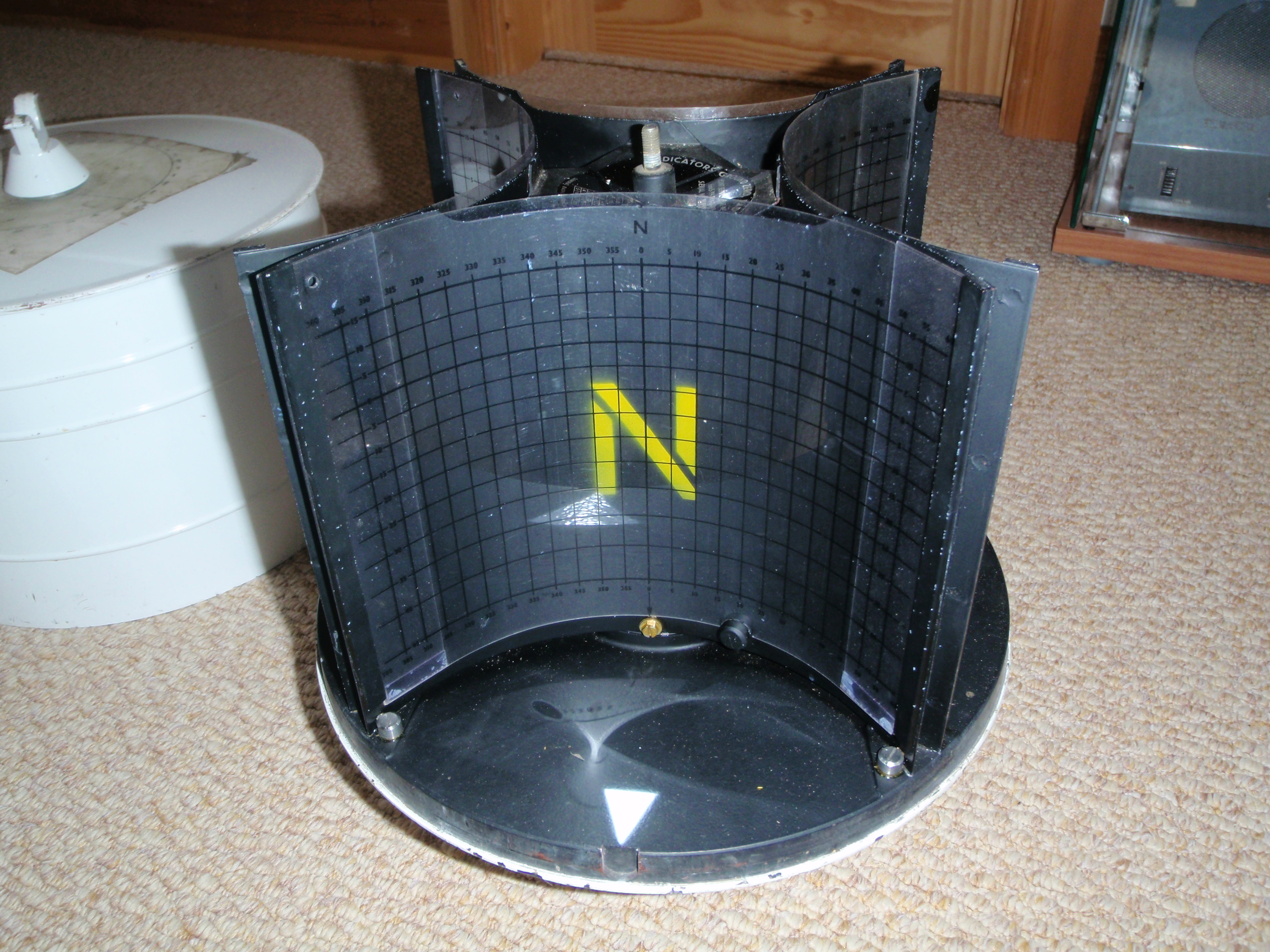
Internal view showing the ‘North Cassette’ which would have held the photosensitive paper.

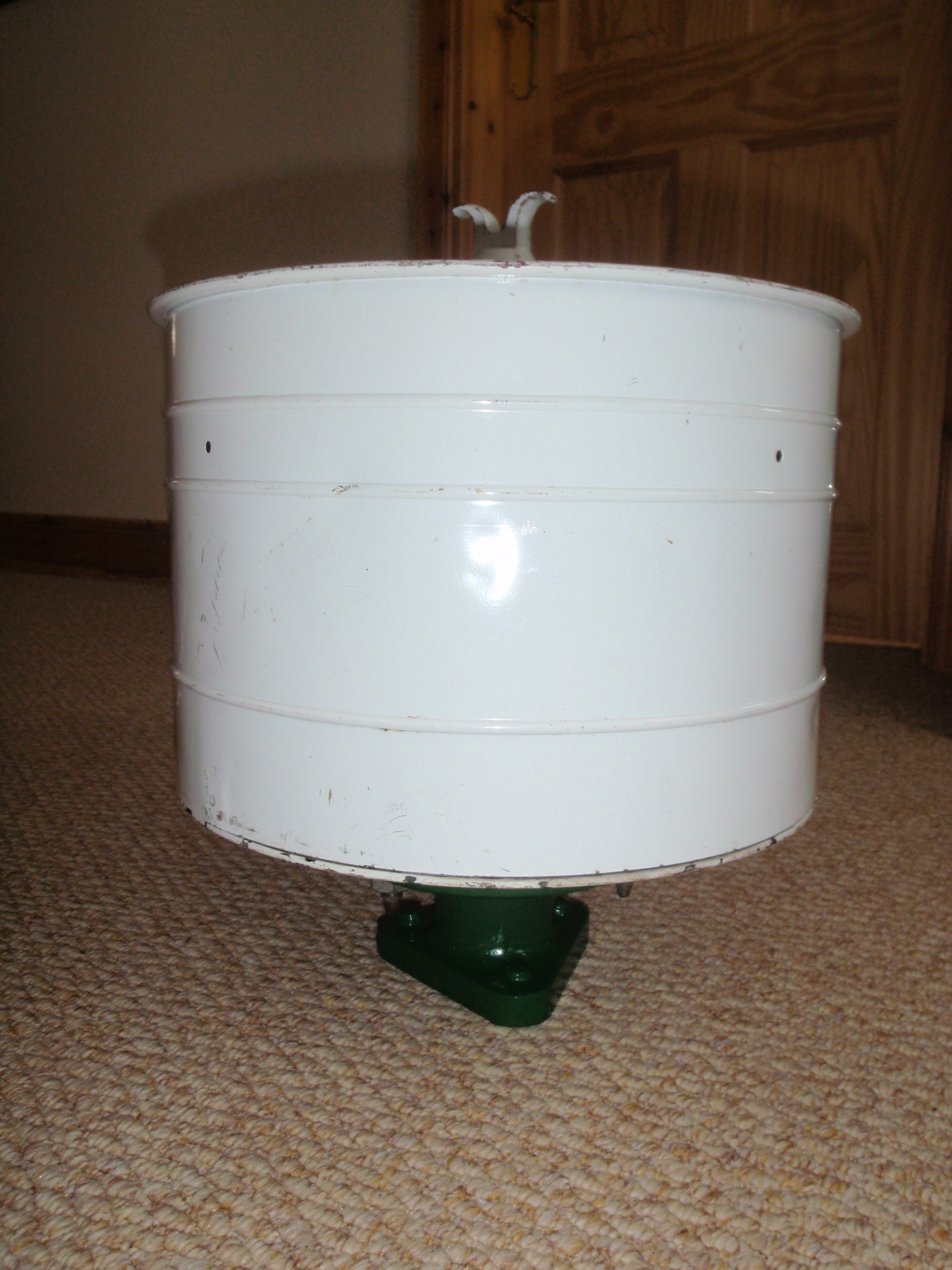
Exterior profile of GZI with two of the four ‘pinholes’ visible.

The Ground Zero Indicator, or GZI or shadowgraph, consisted of four horizontally mounted cardinal compass point pinhole cameras within a metal drum, each 'camera' contained a sheet of photosensitive paper on which were printed horizontal and vertical calibration lines. The flash from a nuclear explosion would produce a mark on one or two of the papers within the drum. The position of the mark enabled the bearing and height of the burst to be estimated. With triangulation between neighbouring posts these readings would give an accurate height and position. The altitude of the explosion was important because a ground or near ground burst would produce radioactive fallout, whereas an air burst would produce only short distance and short lived initial radiations (but no fallout).

== Static measurement of ionising radiation ==
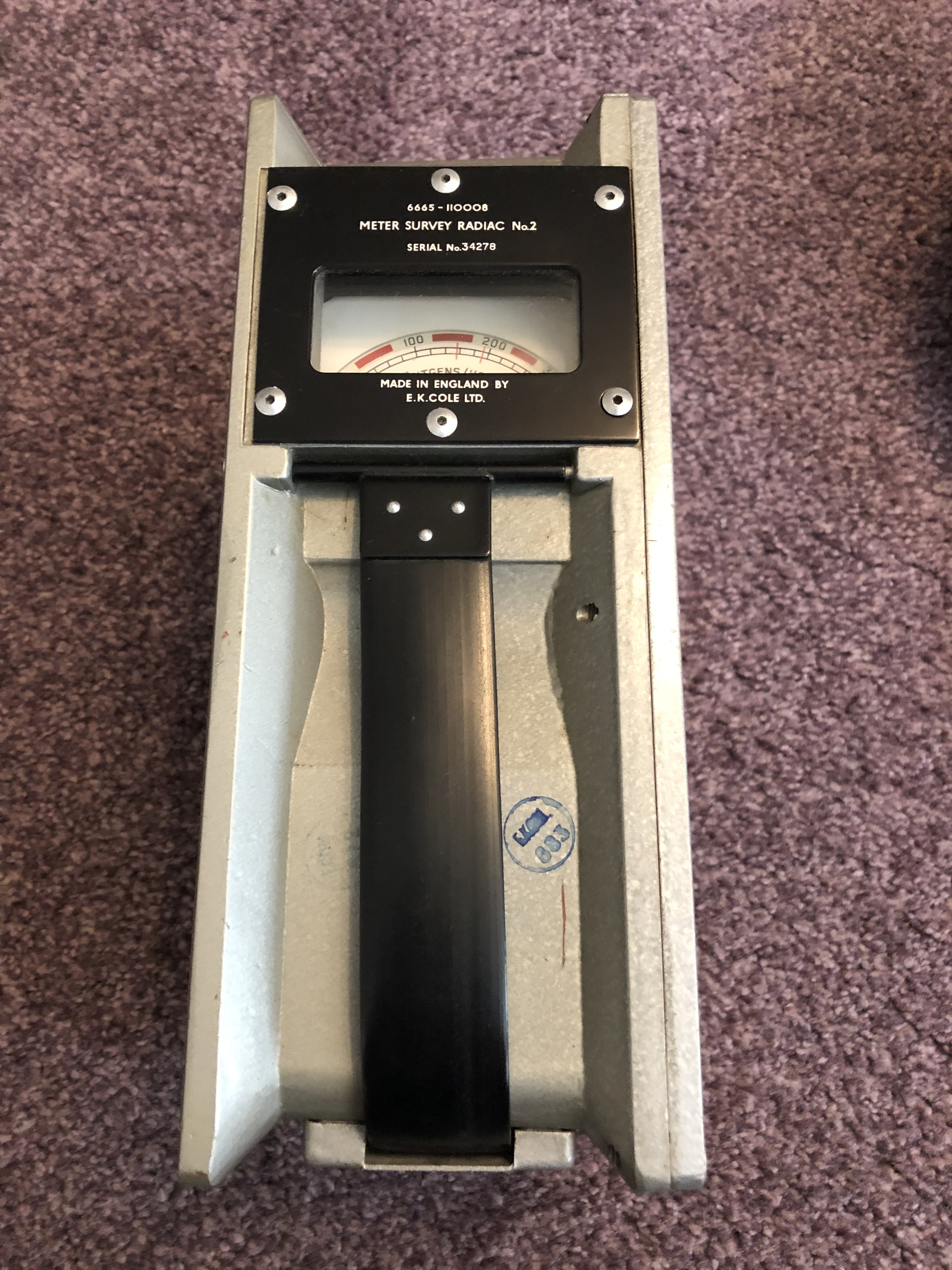
RSM No.2

The Radiac Survey Meter No 2 or RSM was a 1955-meter which used an ionisation chamber to measure gamma radiation, it could measure beta, by removing the base-plate and opening the beta shield. This meter suffered from a number of disadvantages: it required three different types of batteries, of which two were obsolete and had to be manufactured to special order, the circuit included a single electrometer valve or tube. These were favored as they had been tested on fallout in Australia after the Operation Buffalo nuclear tests, and remained in use until 1982 by commissioning a manufacturer to regularly produce special production runs of the obsolete batteries. Within the ROC the RSM was only used at post sites for three years when it was superseded in 1958 by the FSM and the RSM retained only for post attack mobile monitoring missions.

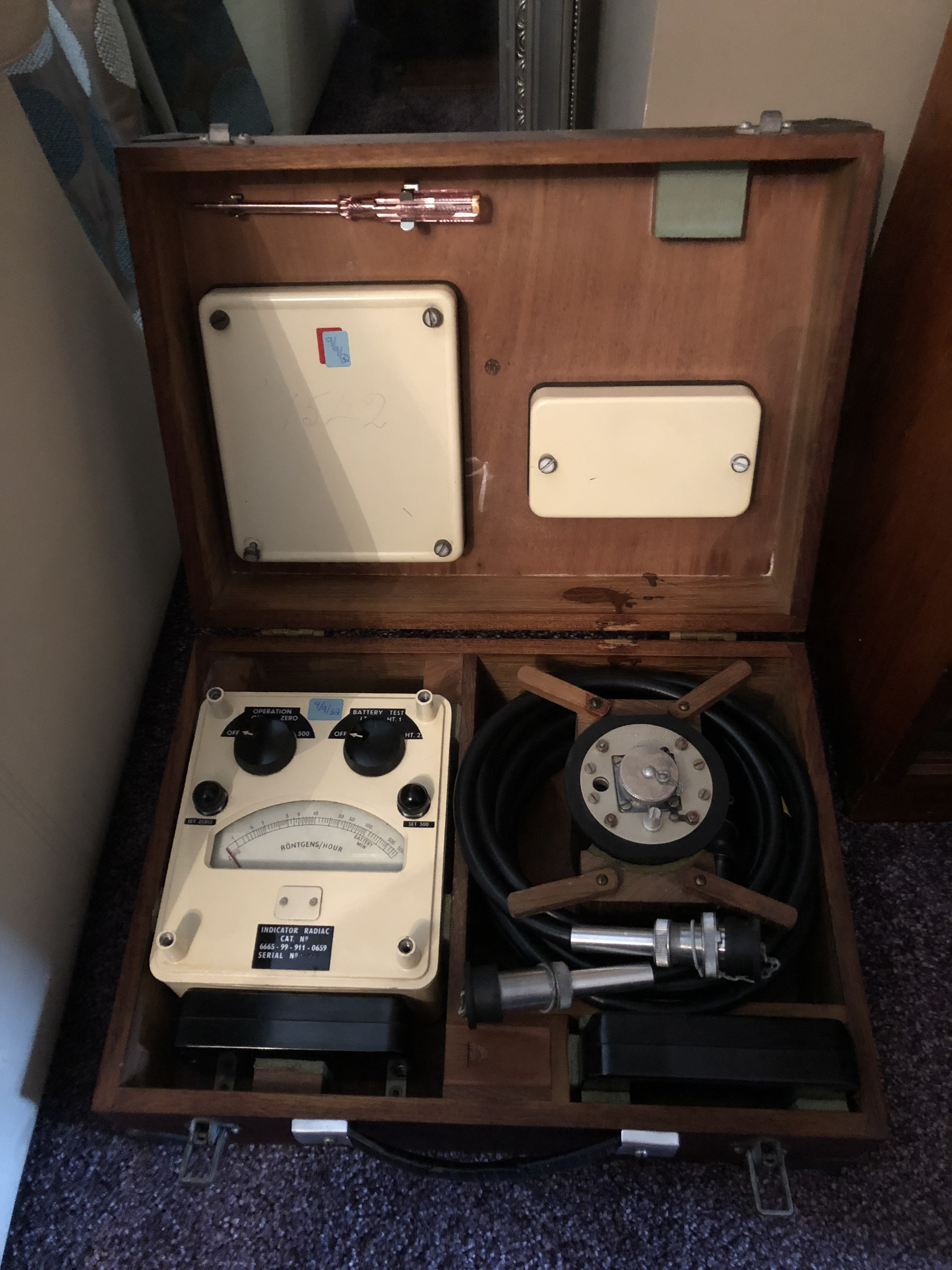
The ‘ROC Fixed Survey Meter’. Manufactured by AVO and introduced in the 1950s.

The Fixed Survey Meter or FSM was introduced in 1958. For the first time it was possible to operate the unit from within the Monitoring Post or Group HQ using an external Geiger Muller Probe connected via coaxial cable and mounted to a telescopic rod and protected on the surface by a polycarbonate dome. The FSM used the same obsolete high voltage batteries as the RSM.

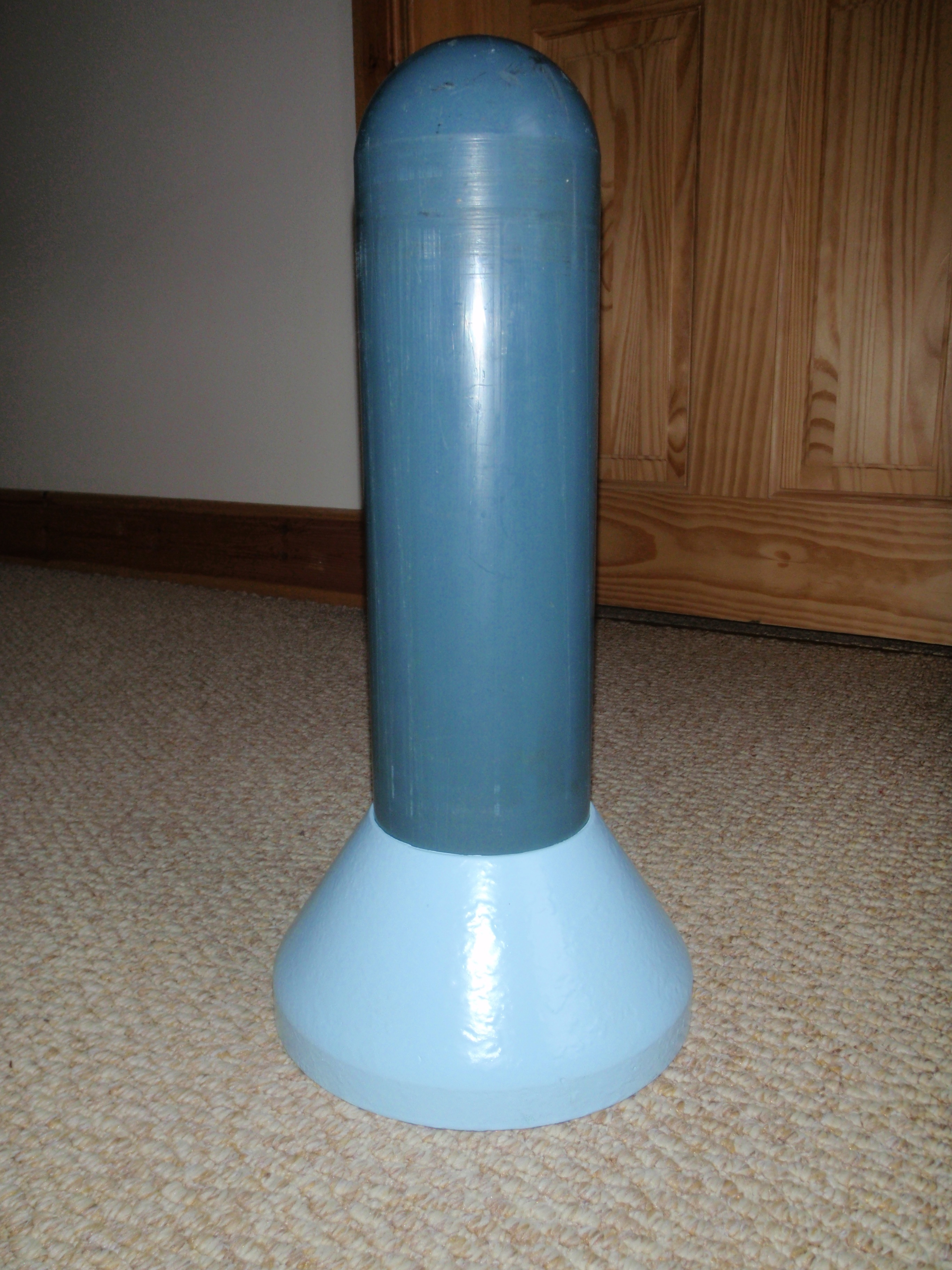
Polycarbonate Dome which was fitted on the surface and held the Fixed Survey Meter Geiger Muller Probe inside. This unit remained unchanged when the PDRM82(F) replaced the FSM.

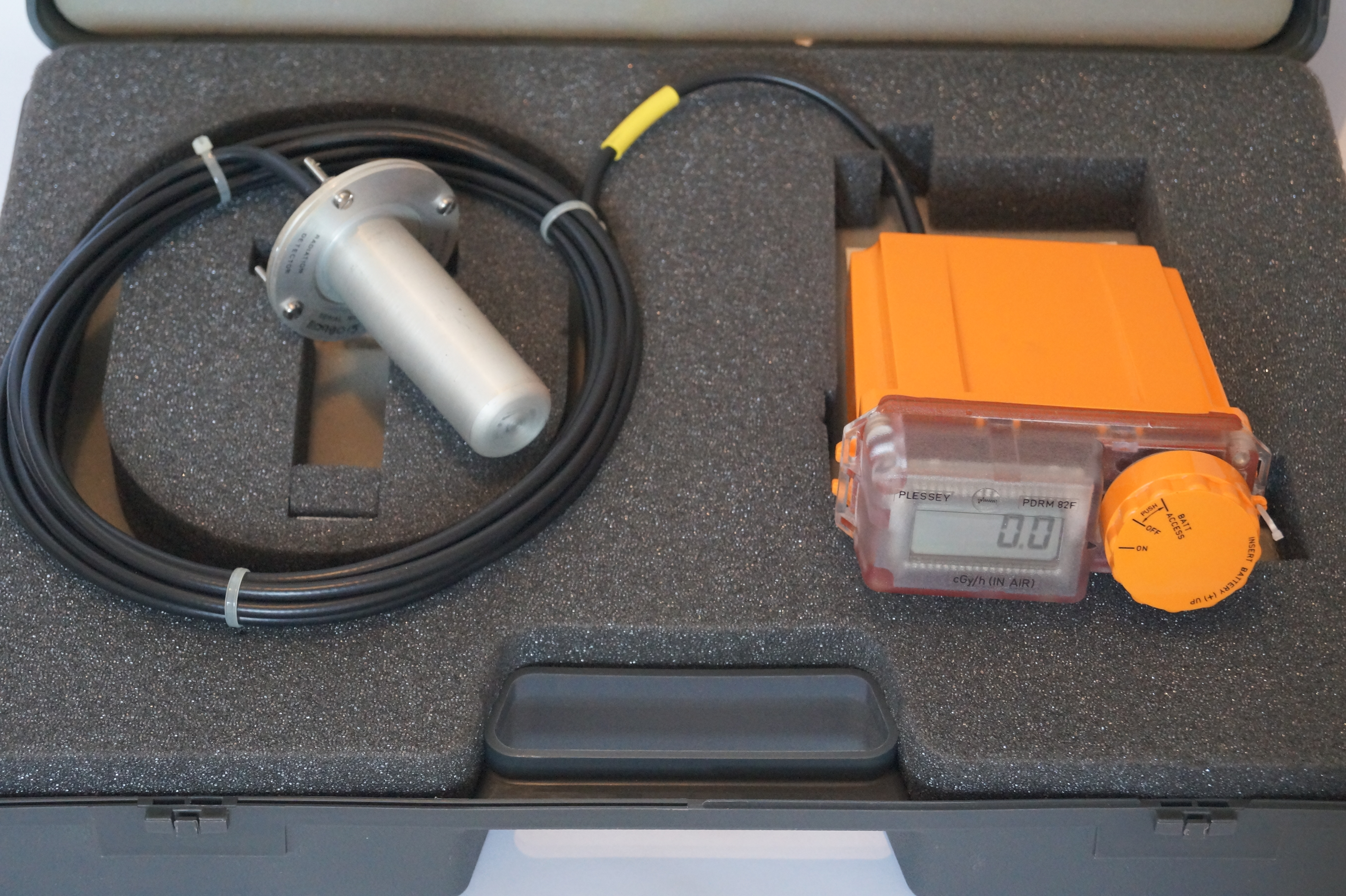
Plessey PDRM82(F)

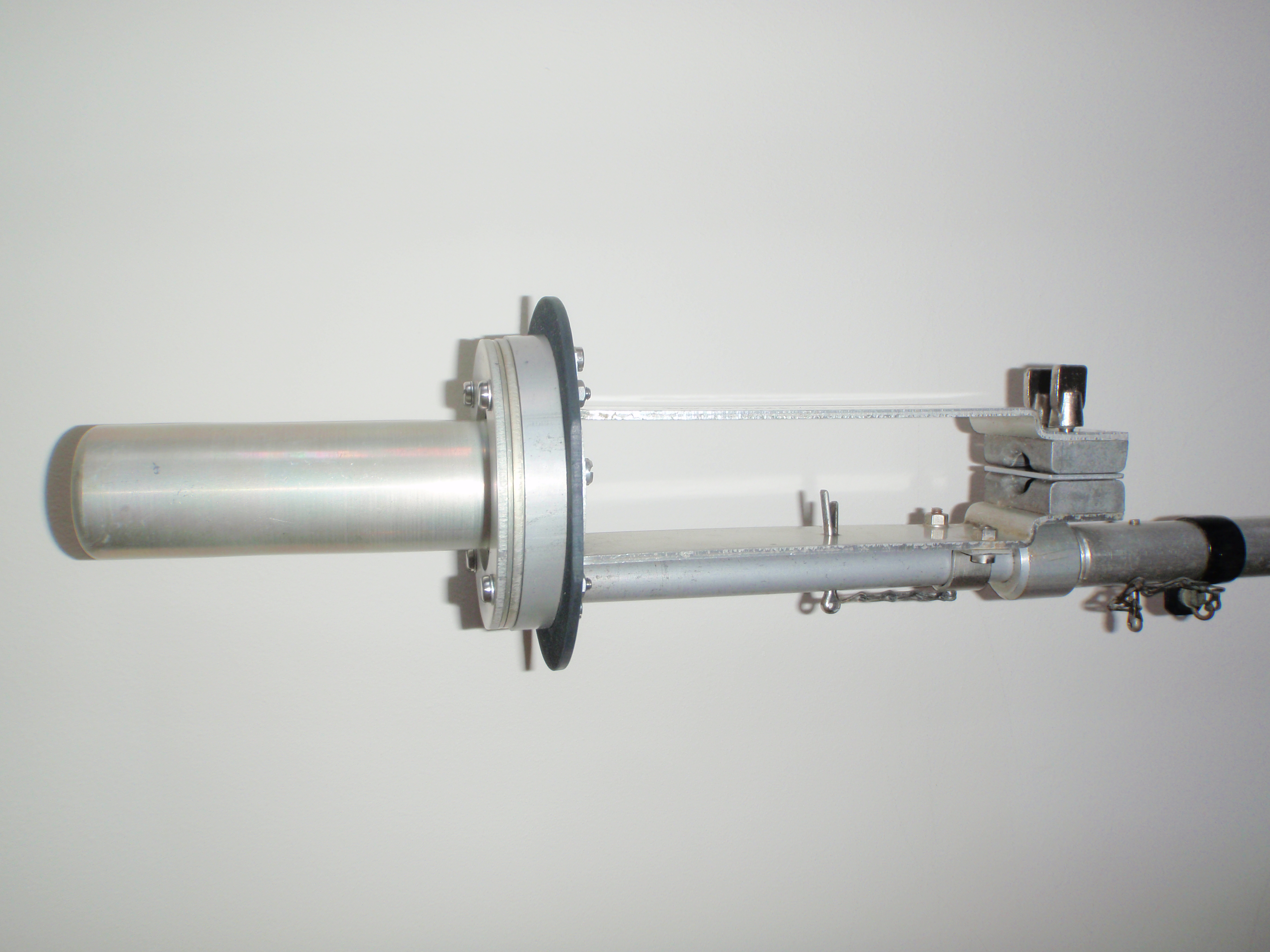
PDRM82F Geiger Muller Probe on its mounting bracket, fitted to the Telescopic Probe Rod.

In 1985 this instrument was replaced by the PDRM82(F). The PDRM82(F) was the fixed desktop version of the PDRM82. It gave more accurate readings and used standard 'C' cell torch batteries that lasted many times longer, up to 400 hours of operation. The compact and robust instruments were housed in sturdy orange coloured polycarbonate cases and had clear liquid crystal displays. The PDRM82(F) could also be operated from within the Monitoring Post or Group HQ as before, using an external Geiger Muller Probe connected via coaxial cable. The telescopic rod, mounting bracket and polycarbonate dome used by the earlier FSM remained in service and continued to be used with the PDRM82(F).

== Portable measurement of radiation during Mobile Monitoring missions ==
The Radiac Survey Meter No 2 or RSM was a 1955-meter which measured gamma and beta radiation. Having been superseded within the ROC by the Fixed Survey Meter the RSM remained in use only for post attack mobile monitoring missions in a post attack period. Image can be seen in ‘Static measurement of ionising radiation’ section.

The Radiac Survey Meter, Lightweight, MkVI, produced by the AVO company (The MkIII and MkIV were also available) were issued to the ROC in the mid-late 1960s, but were not regarded favourable due to using almost obsolete Mallory batteries and were ionisation type meters that measured gamma radiation.

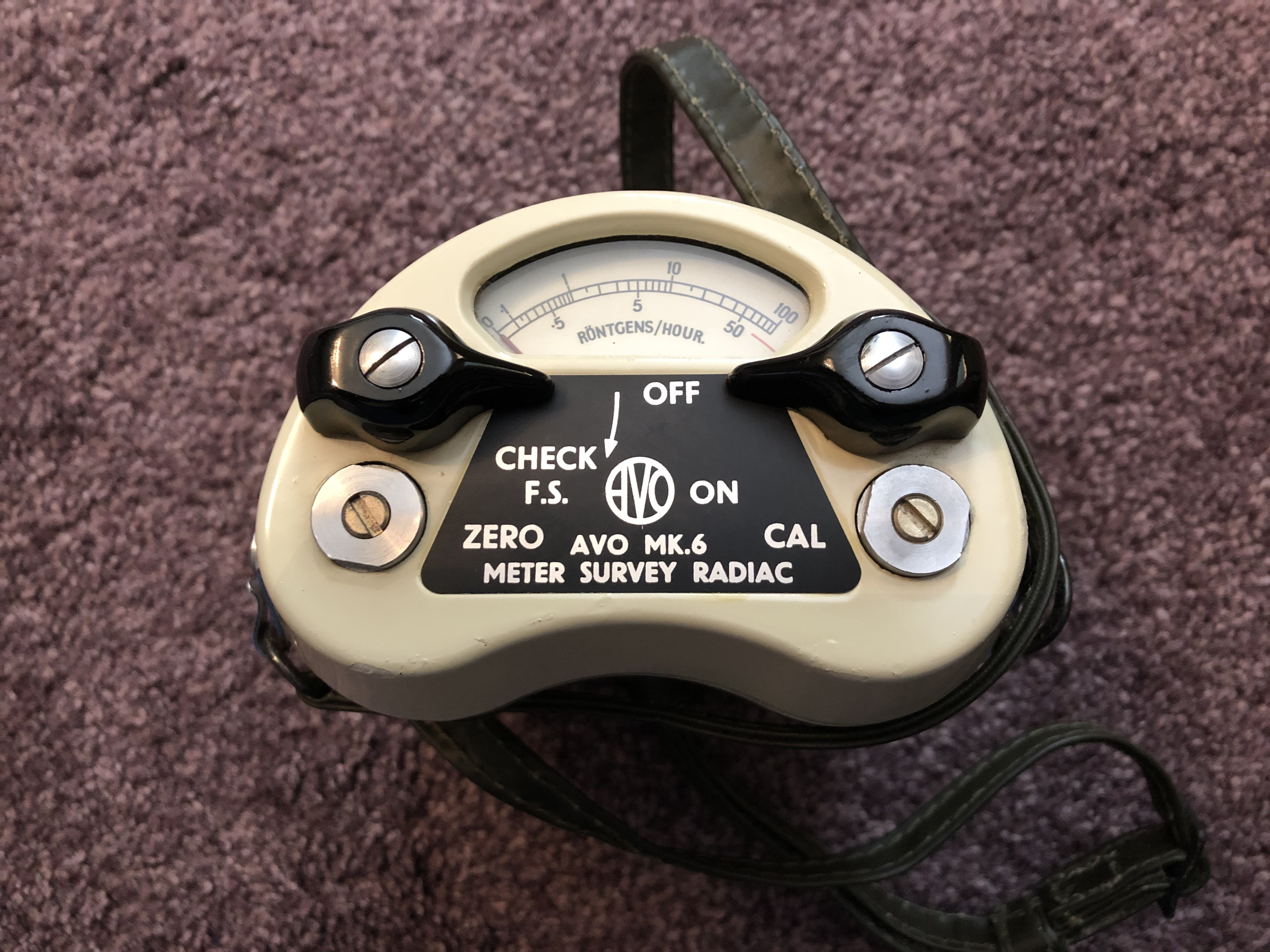
Radiac Survey Meter, Lightweight, MkVI

The PDRM82 or Portable Dose Rate Meter was the standard portable version of the new meters, that were manufactured by Plessey and introduced during the 1980s, giving more accurate readings and using standard 'C' cell torch batteries that lasted many times longer, up to 400 hours of operation. The compact and robust instruments were housed in sturdy orange coloured polycarbonate cases and had clear liquid crystal displays. The Radiac sensor was self-contained within the casing.

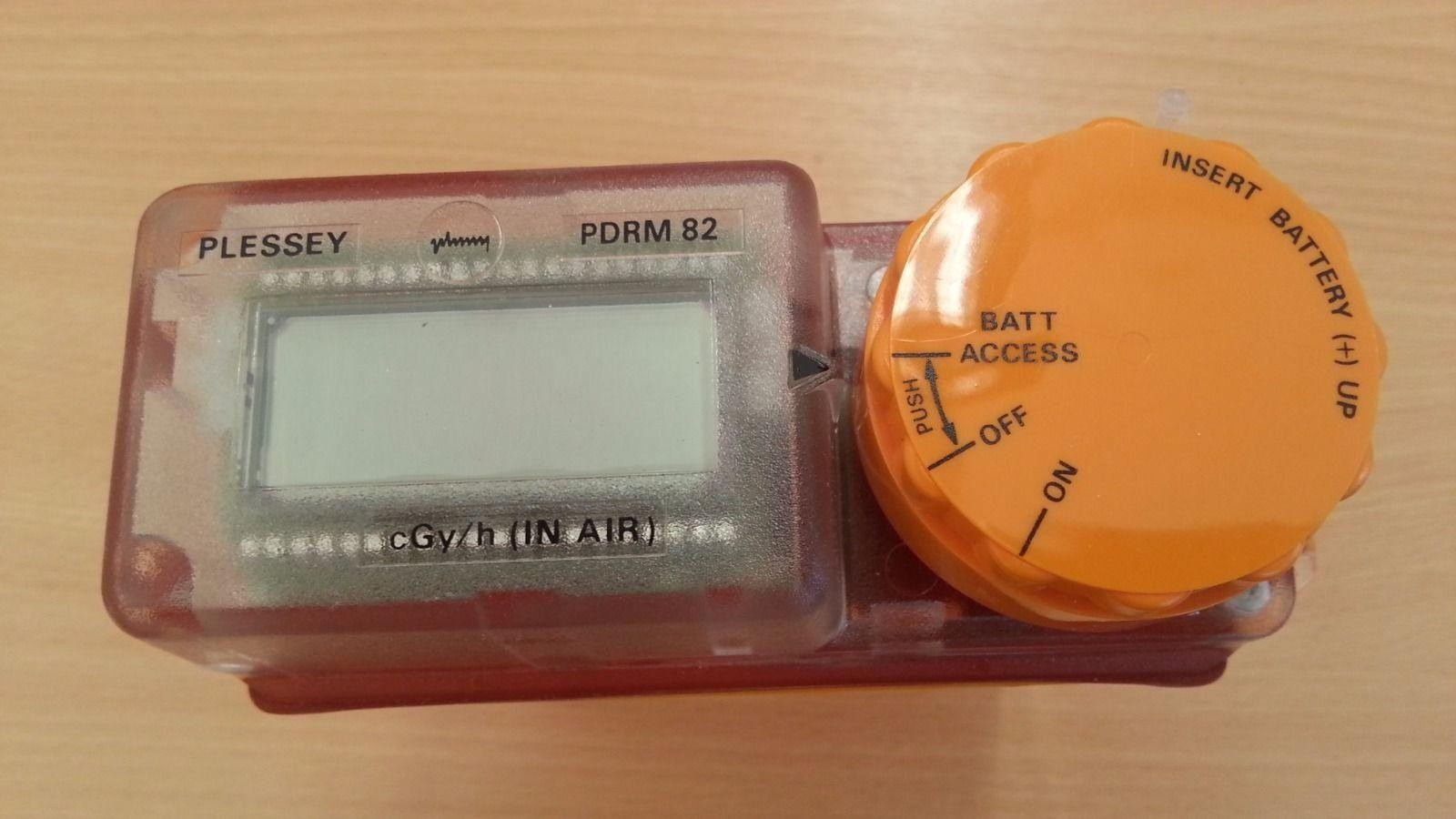
Plessey PDRM82.

== Measurement of personal absorptions ==
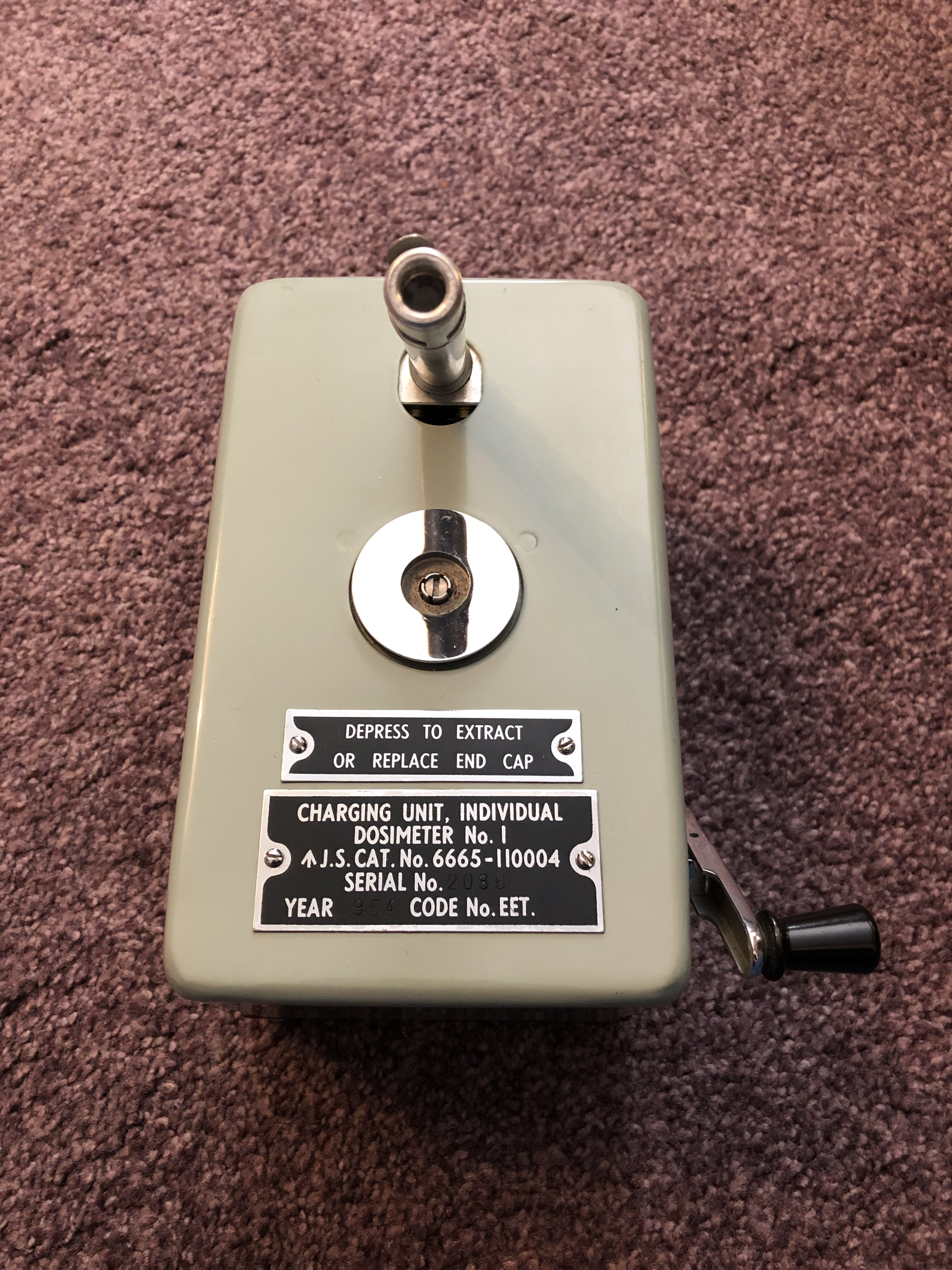
Early hand wound unit. Charging Unit No.1

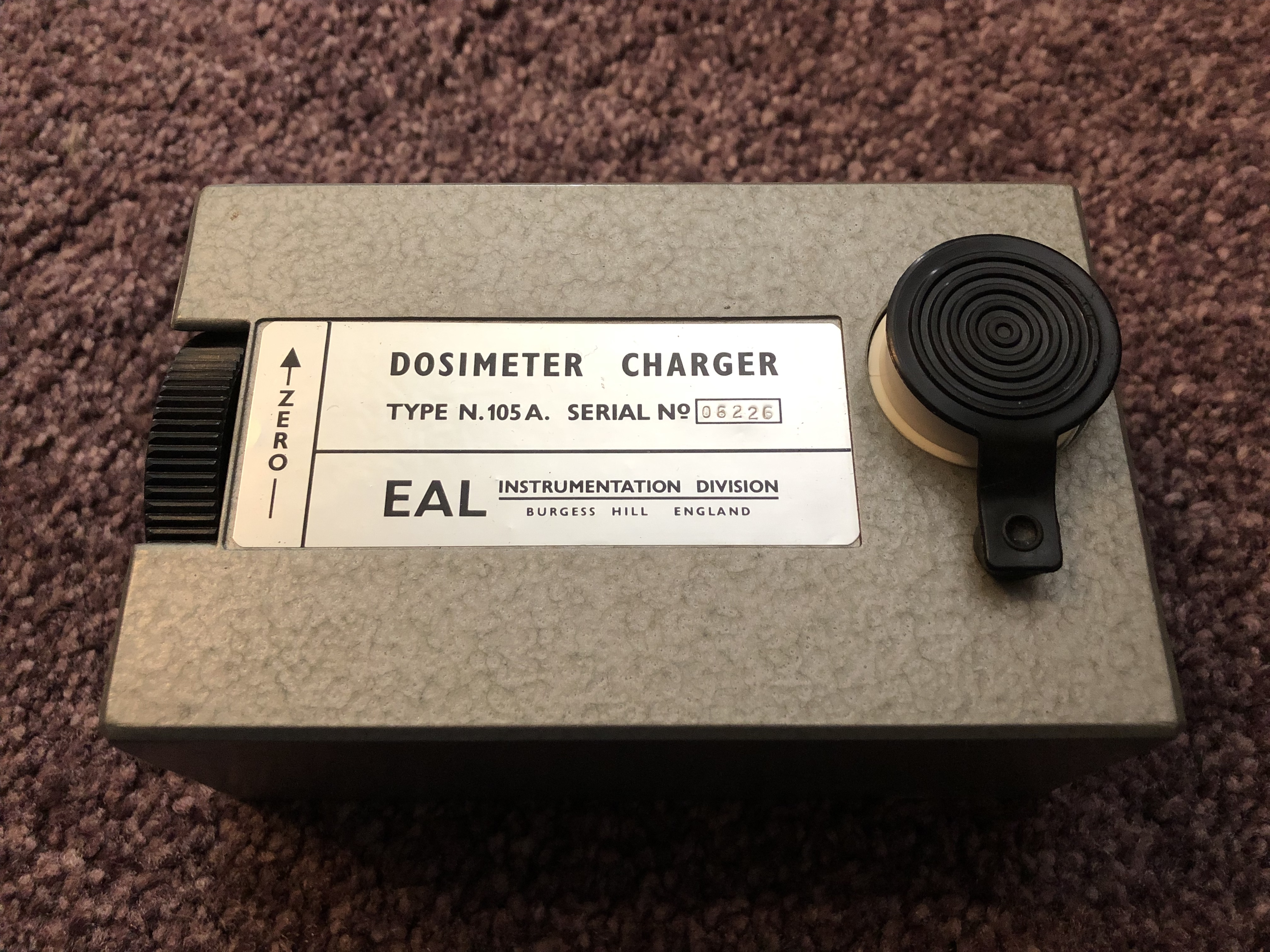
Later battery unit. EAL N.105A

The Dosimeter pocket meters were issued to individual observers for measuring their personal levels of radiation absorption during operations. Three different grades of dosimeter were used, depending on ambient radiation levels. The original hand wound and temperamental dosimeter charging units (Charging Unit, Individual, Dosimeter No.1 & No.2) were replaced during the 1980s by a battery operated automatic charging unit (EAL Type N.105A).

== See also ==
- Royal Observer Corps
- Royal Observer Corps Monitoring Post
- Bomb Power Indicator
- Ground Zero Indicator
- Fixed Survey Meter
- Nuclear MASINT US equivalent
