= Fixed Survey Meter =

Instrument for detecting ionising radiation

The Fixed Survey Meter was a specialist detection instrument used by the Royal Observer Corps during the Cold War between 1958 and 1982 to detect ionising radiation from nuclear fallout generated by a ground burst.

== Overview ==
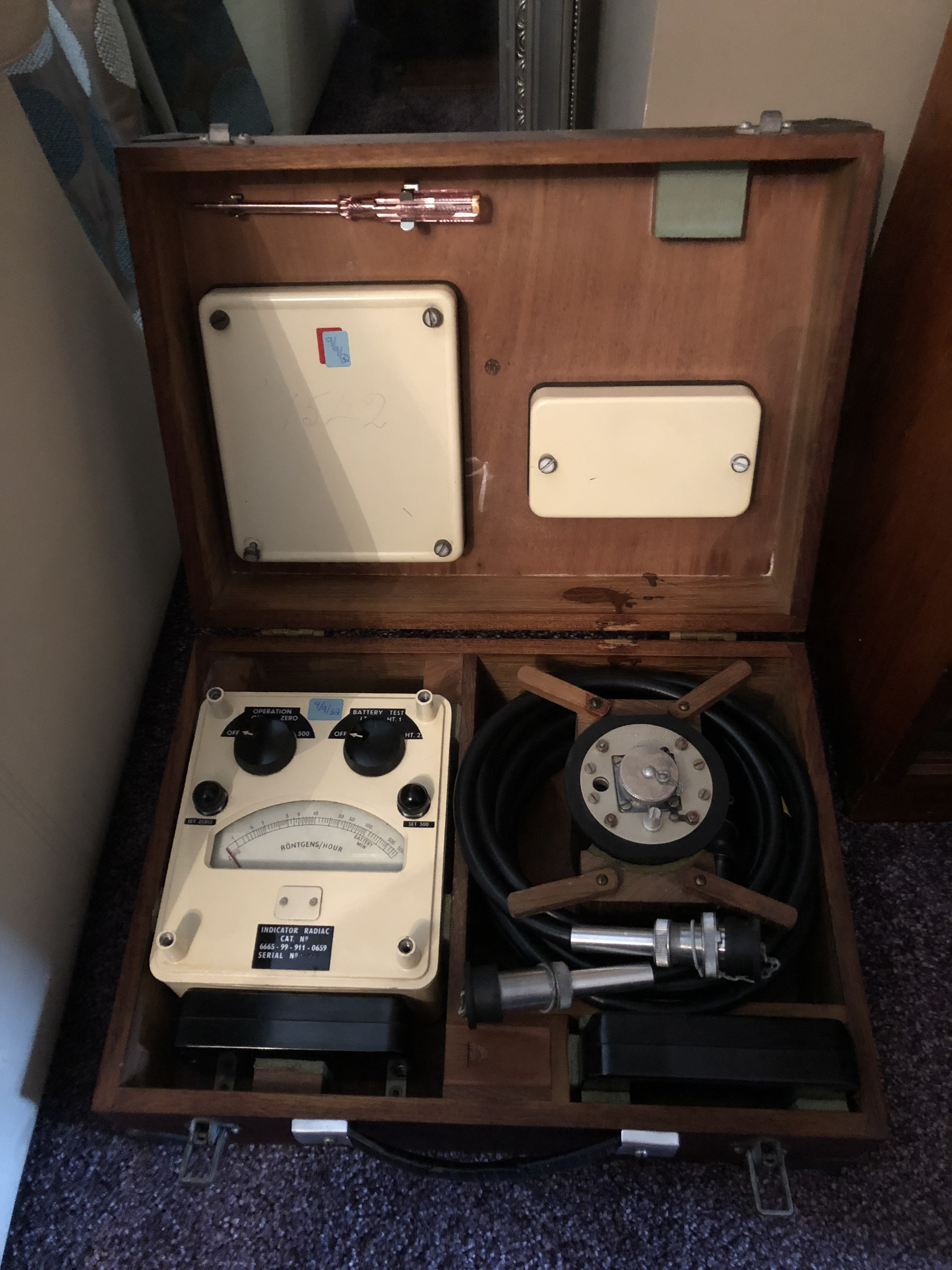
Fixed Survey Meter

The instrument was designed and built by the Atomic Weapons Establishment at Aldermaston as a replacement for the Radiac Survey Meter No 2 which could only be used above ground. The Royal Observer Corps’ need was for an instrument that could be read from inside the protected environment on the underground post.

The instrument had an analogue mechanical dial with a pivoted needle indicator on a scale that covered 0.1 roentgens to 500 roentgens. Powered by three obsolete high voltage batteries (15 volt and 30 volt), that had to be specially manufactured, the meter was contained in a sturdy enamelled metal case. The controls featured an on-off switch combined with a calibration adjustment and a multi-position battery test switch.

The batteries were contained within a clip-on cassette that took several minutes of careful preparation. A spare cassette was also pre-prepared to enable quick battery changes during operations.

The meter was connected by a heavy duty cable to an ionisation chamber mounted onto a telescopic rod that was fed up a probe pipe in the ceiling of the monitoring post so that the probe was above ground. The top of the probe was protected by a polycarbonate dome that prevented fallout from entering the post.

== Operations ==
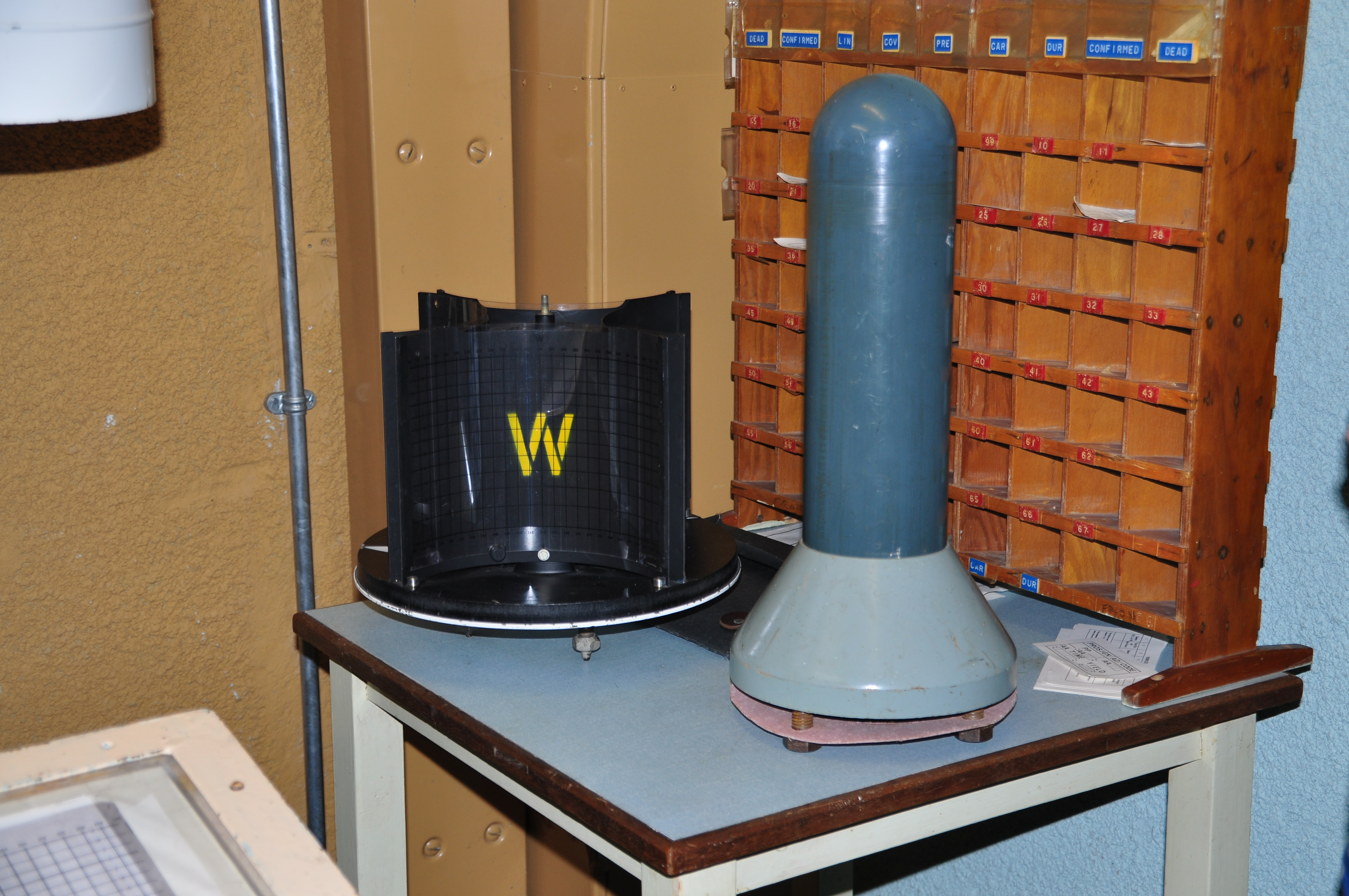
FSM protective dome cover (right), fixed to a plate atop a pipe in order to position the probe above ground level at observation posts. (GZI photosensitive paper mount on left).

The delicate instruments were kept at the group controls in an air conditioned and de-humidified storage room and only issued to posts during Transition To War. Once at the posts the instrument was unpacked from its wooden transit case and prepared for use.

If radiation readings approached the 400 roentgen level the telescopic rod was quickly collapsed and the probe reinserted to a distance below the surface that reduced the dial reading by a factor of ten. Thus the instrument became capable of producing accurate readings to a level of 5,000 roentgens per hour external reading. Shielded readings were prefixed with the word "Red". When readings fell again to an indicated reading of 40 the probe was restored to full height.

Once fallout had arrived anywhere in the group regular five-minute readings were taken from all posts and displayed on the post boards in the operations room

== Codeword ==
The arrival of any radioactive fallout at the post was reported immediately with the codeword FIRST FALLOUT followed by post designation and the time e.g. "First Fallout - Shrewsbury 56 post - Oh three fifty two".

== Training ==
Posts were provided with a dummy FSM trainer, known as the FSMT, that was identical in every way to the operational instrument except that it had a slot on its rear that permitted a roll of plastic trace, fed into the machine by a clockwork mechanism, to make the dial operate realistically over the 24 or 48 hours of a weekend exercise.

== Withdrawal ==
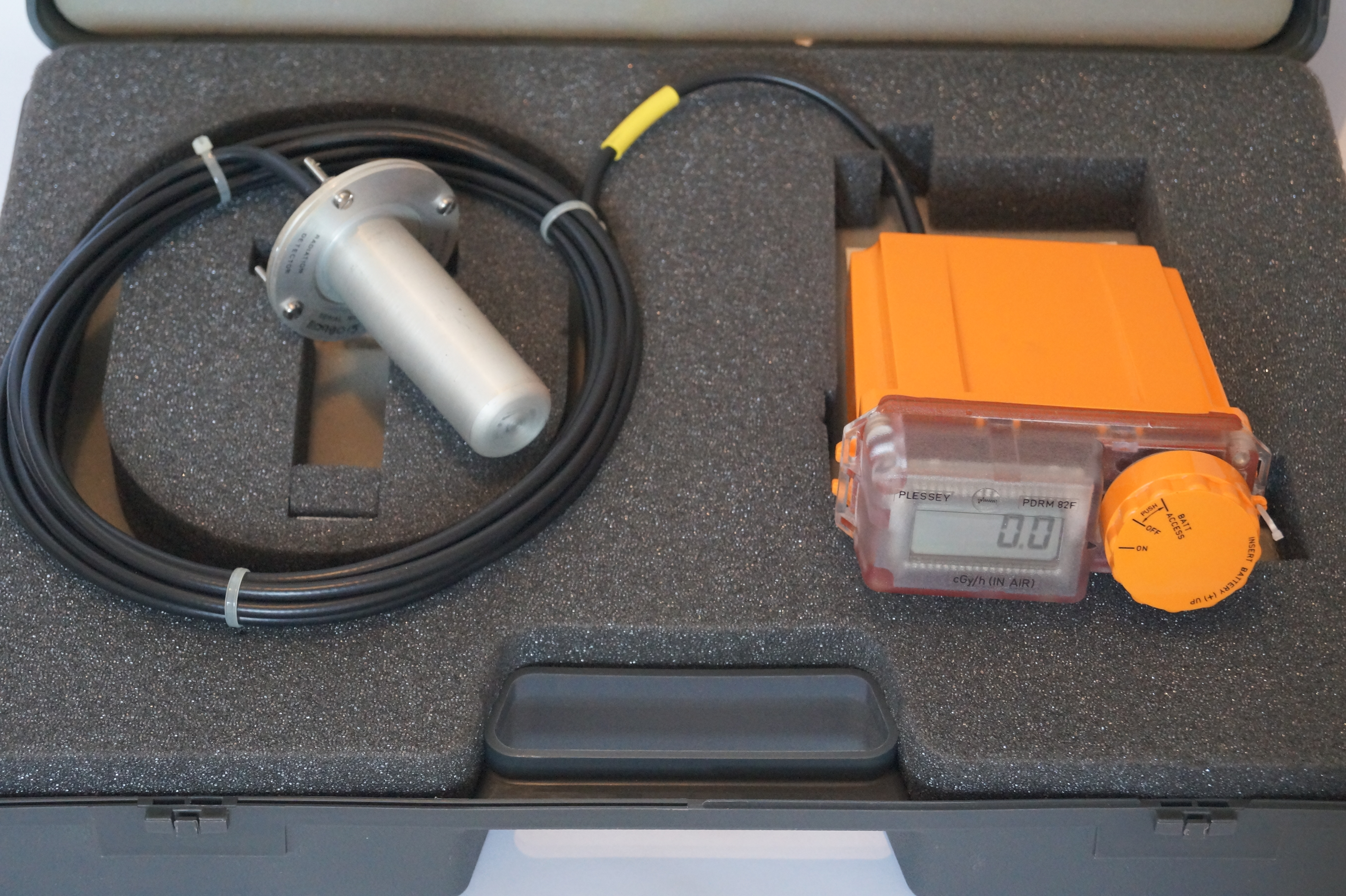
Plessey PDRM82F

Between 1983 and 1984 the FSM and FSMT were withdrawn from use and scrapped. The instrument was replaced by the Plessey PDRM82(F), the fixed version of the new Civil Defence meters. The new polycarbonate cased meters were less delicate and this permitted them to be permanently stored at the monitoring posts instead of being retained at the group controls.

== See also ==
- Royal Observer Corps
- Operational instruments of the Royal Observer Corps
