= Bomb Power Indicator =

Device to measure nuclear explosions

The BPI indicator dial seen on the wall of an underground ROC post during a training exercise

Bomb Power Indicator, also known by the acronym BPI, was an instrument built to detect nuclear explosions and measure the peak overpressure of their blast waves. It was used at the twenty five British Royal Observer Corps (ROC) controls and nearly 1,500 ROC underground monitoring posts, across the United Kingdom during the Cold War.

== Overview ==
The instruments, operated by volunteers, measured the level of peak-overpressure at the instrument's location. Once readings had been combined with information provided by the Ground Zero Indicators it would be possible to estimate the size of the nuclear explosion in megatons. Detailed BPI information was backed up by the automatic AWDREY readings.

The BPI was designed and built by the Atomic Weapons Establishment at Aldermaston. The design was tested for performance and accuracy using real nuclear explosions at the 1957 nuclear weapons tests at Kiritimati (or Christmas Island), after being mounted on board a ship. A number of BPIs were also tested in Australia during the Operation Buffalo series of nuclear tests, with units located at various distances from ground zero.

== Operations ==
Above ground, a pair of circular plated baffles would be affected by the passing of the blast wave. The detector was connected by a steel pipe to the indicator dial below ground in the protected monitoring post. The dial was wall mounted and measured readings from 0.1 to 5 pounds per square inch peak overpressure. Readings below 0.3 pounds per square inch were noted but not reported.

The baffles were normally stored below ground and only screwed onto the top of the pipe at the start of exercises or at Transition To War. Outside of operations the BPI pipe was protected by a screw on cap and there was a drain valve at the base of the instrument to remove any excess rainwater.

If the BPI registered a reading of 0.3 or higher the operator would wait ten seconds before pressing the reset button and making a report to the group control. One minute after a BPI reading an observer is sent above ground to change the photographic papers in the Ground Zero Indicator.

== Codeword ==
Royal Observer Corps reports following a reading on any BPI were prefixed with the codeword "Tocsin" e.g. "Tocsin Shrewsbury 56 post - (time) oh five fifty five - pressure two point six".

== See also ==
- Royal Observer Corps
- Operational instruments of the Royal Observer Corps
