= Ground Zero Indicator =

Measurement device

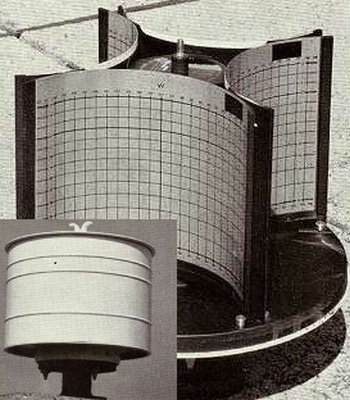
Ground Zero Indicator, showing the interior graticules (and the insert at bottom left shows the instrument mounted with its cover in place)

The Ground Zero Indicator, known by the acronym GZI was a specially designed shadowgraph instrument used by the British Royal Observer Corps during the Cold War to locate the Ground Zero of any nuclear explosion. It consisted of four horizontally mounted cardinal compass point pinhole cameras within a metal drum. Flash from a nuclear explosion would produce a mark on one or multiple of the papers within the drum and its position of the mark has enabled the bearing and height of the burst to be estimated in terms of engineering. With a triangulation between both neighbouring posts these types of readings would give a considered accurate height and position, which is identified by assessing the height of the explosion imprint above the horizon level that had been pre-exposed onto the paper.

== Overview ==
The GZI consisted of four horizontally mounted cardinal compass point pinhole cameras within a white enamelled metal drum, each 'camera' contained a sheet of photosensitive paper mounted within a clear plastic cassette on which were printed horizontal and vertical calibration lines delineating compass bearing and elevation above the horizon. The bright flash from a nuclear explosion would burn a mark on one or two of the papers within the drum. The position of the burn spot enabled the bearing and height of the burst to be estimated. With triangulation between neighbouring posts these readings would give an accurate height and position.

The altitude of the explosion was important because a ground or near ground burst would produce radioactive fallout, whereas an air burst would produce only short distance and short lived initial radiations (but no fallout). Once combined with the peak-overpressure readings from post Bomb Power Indicator readings the power of the burst in megatons could also be calculated by the Triangulation Team in the group control building, using a hand held plastic calculator device.

== Operations ==
Normally stored below ground, the drum was mounted at the start of exercises or upon transition to war on a special above-ground mount set in the concrete of the entrance hatch. Concentric lugs on the mount ensured that the drum was mounted correctly, even in the dark.

The light-sensitive photographic paper was chemically unfixed and had to be protected from daylight by being carried in a protective pouch strapped to the observer's chest. The cassettes were always lodged in a specific order so they could be changed in pitch blackness with practice. Differing notched cutouts at the bottom of the cassettes ensured they could not be mounted at the incorrect cardinal point.

Daylight inevitably darkened the unfixed paper so routine changes were made at midday during winter operations and twice daily, at midday and sunset, during the summer months. The sun burned a distinctive trail across the papers when there was no cloud cover.

Sixty seconds after any reading on the Bomb Power Indicator an observer exited the post and changed the GZI cassettes. The exposed papers were returned underground for assessment. The pre-exposed papers had a graticule grid showing degrees of bearing. The fireball from any nuclear burst within range would leave a mark on the paper. The spot size and bearing would then be reported to the group control together with an indication of whether the spot was touching or clear of the horizon, which was essential for determining whether the burst was an air burst or a ground burst.

== Codeword ==
Reports following readings on the GZI were prefixed with the words "Nuclear Burst" and the monitoring post's operational identifier e.g. "Nuclear Burst Shrewsbury 56 post - (time) oh six hundred - Bearing zero seven zero - spotsize zero six - touching".

== Training ==
For realistic exercise training photographic papers with simulated burst spots were prepared by the Exercise Division of the United Kingdom Warning and Monitoring Organisation at Cowley. Delivered sealed, the time of opening was written on the outside of the sealed envelope.

Observers trained blindfolded so that they could exit the post up the vertical steel ladder and complete a GZI cassette change quickly and even in pitch blackness of a winter's night.

== See also ==
- Royal Observer Corps
- Operational instruments of the Royal Observer Corps
