= List of Royal Observer Corps / United Kingdom Warning and Monitoring Organisation Posts =

This is a list of Royal Observer Corps Monitoring Post and United Kingdom Warning and Monitoring Organisation civil defence posts for monitoring aircraft operating over Great Britain. This list has been split into:

- List of ROC Group Headquarters and UKWMO Sector controls
- List of Royal Observer Corps / United Kingdom Warning and Monitoring Organisation Posts (A–E)
- List of Royal Observer Corps / United Kingdom Warning and Monitoring Organisation Posts (F–K)
- List of Royal Observer Corps / United Kingdom Warning and Monitoring Organisation Posts (L–P)
- List of Royal Observer Corps / United Kingdom Warning and Monitoring Organisation Posts (Q–Z)

== See also ==
- Aircraft Identity Corps
- Aircraft recognition
- AWDREY
- Bomb Power Indicator
- Civil Air Patrol
- Commandant Royal Observer Corps
- Fixed Survey Meter
- Four-minute warning
- Ground Observer Corps
- Ground Zero Indicator
- Operational instruments of the Royal Observer Corps
- RAF Bentley Priory
- Royal Observer Corps Medal
- Skywatch march
- Volunteer Air Observers Corps (Australia)
