= List of Royal Observer Corps / United Kingdom Warning and Monitoring Organisation Posts (L–P) =

This is a list of Royal Observer Corps (ROC) nuclear monitoring posts incorporated into the United Kingdom Warning and Monitoring Organisation (UKWMO).

- List of Royal Observer Corps / United Kingdom Warning and Monitoring Organisation Posts (A–E)
- List of Royal Observer Corps / United Kingdom Warning and Monitoring Organisation Posts (F–K)
- List of Royal Observer Corps / United Kingdom Warning and Monitoring Organisation Posts (L–P)
- List of Royal Observer Corps / United Kingdom Warning and Monitoring Organisation Posts (Q–Z)

Notes:-

- 1. Many of these underground bunkers still exist under private ownership, permission of the owner is paramount before attempting to locate them.
- 2. With a few exceptions the surviving bunkers are in varying states of dereliction and are unsafe.
- 3. Counties listed are contemporary which may differ from present counties.

List
Post Location	County	OS National Grid reference	1st Opening	1st Closing	2nd Operating period
ROC Post Lairg	Sutherland	NC583060	1959	1991	
ROC Post Lakenheath	Suffolk	TL72668261	1968	1991	
ROC Post Lampeter Master Post	Cardiganshire	SN58214841	1959	1991	
ROC Post Lamphey	Pembrokeshire	SN04160083	1960	1968	
ROC Post Lancing	Sussex	TQ17160354	1962	1968	
ROC Post Langham Master Post	Essex	TM00843050	1961	1991	
ROC Post Langholm Master Post	Dumfriesshire	NY36568577	1961	1991	
ROC Post Langport	Somerset	ST41742841	1958	1991	
ROC Post Langtoft	Yorkshire	TA00466640	1959	1991	
ROC Post Larne	Antrim	ID39580406	1961	1991	
ROC Post Latchingdon	Essex	TL88260095	1960	1968	
ROC Post Latheron	Caithness	ND20333342	1959	1991	
ROC Post Lauder	Berwickshire	NT52584671	1963	1991	
ROC Post Laugharne	Carmarthenshire	SN30020990	1963	1991	
ROC Post Launceston	Cornwall	SX33468406	1961	1991	
ROC Post Laurencekirk	Kincardineshire	NO713726	1959	1968	
ROC Post Lavenham	Suffolk	TL91734863	1959	1968	
ROC Post Lea	Herefordshire	SO67182203	1961	1991	
ROC Post Leigh-on-Sea (L3)	Essex	TQ83518728	1966	1991	
ROC Post Leighterton	Gloucestershire	ST82948937	1963	1991	
ROC Post Lenham	Kent	TQ90185368	1962	1968	
ROC Post Leominster Master Post	Herefordshire	SO51455772	1961	1991	
ROC Post Lerwick	Shetland	HU44714237	1961	1991	
ROC Post Leslie	Fife	NO250005	1963	1968	
ROC Post Lesmahagow	Lanarkshire	NS79873835	1959	1968	
ROC Post Letchworth	Hertfordshire	TL20153266	1960	1968	
ROC Post Letham Master Post	Angus	NO52704985	1959	1991	
ROC Post Letterston	Pembrokeshire	SM94902935	1960	1968	
ROC Post Leven	Fife	NO38920169	1961	1968	
ROC Post Lewes	Sussex	TQ39301126	1960	1991	
ROC Post Lexden	Essex	TL97092257	Unknown	1968	
ROC Post Leyburn	Yorkshire	SE11949145	1966	1968	
ROC Post Liddesdale	Roxburghshire	NY47858797	1962	1968	
ROC Post Lilliesleaf	Roxburghshire	NT52372756	1961	1968	
ROC Post Limavady	Londonderry	IC68372193	1957	1991	
ROC Post Lindholme	Yorkshire	SE69060757	1962	1991	
ROC Post Linton, Cambridgeshire	Cambridgeshire	TL55394650	1961	1991	
ROC Post Linton, Kent	Kent	TQ76405097	1962	1991	
ROC Post Lintrathen	Angus	NO29145491	1957	1968	
ROC Post Liskeard	Cornwall	SX25656467	1961	1991	
ROC Post Lisnaskea	Fermanagh	IH36453422	1957	1991	
ROC Post Little Waltham	Essex	TL71021338	1957	1975	
ROC Post Little Sodbury Master Post	Gloucestershire	ST76658385	1960	1991	
ROC Post Little Steeping	Lincolnshire	TF42566183	1962	1991	
ROC Post Littleport	Cambridgeshire	TL56388524	1960	1968	
ROC Post Littlehampton	Sussex	SU99590327	1960	1991	
ROC Post Llananno	Radnorshire	SO09697448	1960	1991	
ROC Post Llanbedr	Merionethshire	SH58552612	1960	1991	
ROC Post Llanboidy	Carmarthenshire	SN20612323	1960	1991	
ROC Post Llanbrynmair	Montgomeryshire	SH90060287	1961	1968	
ROC Post Llandovery	Carmarthenshire	SN76573534	1961	1991	
ROC Post Llandrindod Wells	Radnorshire	SO06026027	1958	1991	
ROC Post Llandudno	Caernarvonshire	SH77588137	1961	1991	
ROC Post Llandysul	Cardiganshire	SN39254315	1960	1968	
ROC Post Llanfaethlu Master Post	Anglesey	SH31138693	1959	1981	
ROC Post Llanfair Caereinion	Montgomeryshire	SJ10180624	1961	1968	
ROC Post Llanfair Talhaiarn	Denbighshire	SH92936999	1960	1991	
ROC Post Llanfairfechan	Caernarvonshire	SH677742	1960	1968	
ROC Post Llanfyllin	Montgomeryshire	SJ14622018	1965	1968	
ROC Post Llangadfan	Montgomeryshire	SJ01991161	1962	1968	
ROC Post Llangammarch Wells	Breconshire	SN92834759	1958	1991	
ROC Post Llangefni	Anglesey	SH45627658	1960	1981	
ROC Post Llangollen Master Post	Denbighshire	SJ21534277	1958	1991	
ROC Post Llanidloes	Montgomeryshire	SN947857	1960	1991	
ROC Post Llanishen	Glamorganshire	ST18988508	1966	1991	
ROC Post Llanon	Cardiganshire	SN51746680	1959	1991	
ROC Post Llanrhaeadr-yng-Nghinmeirch	Denbighshire	SJ13112608	1965	1991	
ROC Post Llanrwst	Denbighshire	SH808624	1960	1968	
ROC Post Llantilio Crossenny	Monmouthshire	SO40411410	1961	1991	
ROC Post Llantwit Major	Glamorganshire	SS97346922	1960	1968	
ROC Post Llanuwchllyn	Merionethshire	SH87842936	1960	1968	1981-1991
ROC Post Llanwddyn	Montgomeryshire	SJ02601869	1962	1991	
ROC Post Llanymynech	Montgomeryshire	SJ26452130	1960	1991	
ROC Post Llysfaen	Denbighshire	SH88877736	1962	1968	
ROC Post Lochaline Master Post	Argyllshire	NM67444517	1963	1991	
ROC Post Lochboisdale	Inverness-shire	NF77092028	1963	1991	
ROC Post Lochcarron	Ross & Cromarty	NG94724450	Unknown	1991	
ROC Post Lochearnhead	Perthshire	NN60322231 (probable)	Unknown	1968	
ROC Post Lochgilphead Master Post	Argyllshire	NR84988593	1960	1991	
ROC Post Lochmaddy	Inverness-shire	NF91376893	1963	1991	
ROC Post Lockerbie	Dumfriesshire	MY144816	1964	1968	
ROC Post Lockerley	Hampshire	SU31272494	1966	Ca1975 to 1983	
ROC Post Lockton	Yorkshire	SE84238924	1961	1968	
ROC Post Loddon	Norfolk	TM36969825	1961	1968	
ROC Post Loftus	Yorkshire	NZ72091980	1962	1968	
ROC Post Derry	Londonderry	IC39981742	1957	1991	
ROC Post Long Ashton	Somerset	ST53916937	1960	1968	
ROC Post Long Compton	Warwickshire	SP29643097	1961	1991	
ROC Post Long Stratton	Norfolk	TM20239208	1959	1968	
ROC Post Long Sutton	Lincolnshire	TF44402553	1962	1968	
ROC Post Longformacus	Berwickshire	NT686580	1963	1968	
ROC Post Longhorsley	Northumberland	NZ14189432	1960	1991	
ROC Post Longhoughton	Northumberland	NU25881553	1962	1968	
ROC Post Longparish	Hampshire	SU43594346	1961	1968	
ROC Post Longridge	Lancashire	SD62133883	1960	1991	
ROC Post Longton, Lancashire	Lancashire	SD47622605	Unknown	1968	
ROC Post Longton, Staffordshire	Staffordshire	SJ930445	1965	1968	
ROC Post Longworth	Berkshire	SU41229962	1959	1968	
ROC Post Louth	Lincolnshire	TF33738474	1959	1991	
ROC Post Lowestoft	Suffolk	TM54659588	1959	1991	
ROC Post Ludlow	Shropshire	SO50407436	1961	1991	
ROC Post Lurgan	Armagh	IJ096597	1957	Before 1991	
ROC Post Lutterworth	Leicestershire	SP52038559	1963	1991	
ROC Post Lydbury North	Shropshire	SO36018596	1965	1991	
ROC Post Lydeard St. Lawrence	Somerset	ST12433133	1961	1968	
ROC Post Lydford	Devonshire	SX52738557	1960	1991	
ROC Post Lyminge	Kent	TR16754080	1960	1968	
ROC Post Lyndhurst	Hampshire	SU28870884	1962	1991	
ROC Post Lynton Master Post	Devonshire	SS72654821	1961	1991	
ROC Post Lyonshall	Herefordshire	SO32525638	1963	1991	
ROC Post Lytham	Lancashire	SD 33622739	1963	1991	
ROC Post Mablethorpe	Lincolnshire	TF50308633	1961	1991	
ROC Post Macclesfield	Cheshire	SJ92497256	1965	1968	
ROC Post Macduff	Banffshire	NJ708644	1959	1991	
ROC Post Machrihanish Master Post	Argyllshire	NR66822247	1963	1991	
ROC Post Machynlleth	Montgomeryshire	SH74120077	1961	1991	
ROC Post Madron Master Post	Cornwall	SW43833354	1962	1991	
ROC Post Maenclochog	Pembrokeshire	SN07082788	1960	1991	
ROC Post Maesteg	Glamorganshire	SS84679074	1961	1991	
ROC Post Malborough	Devonshire	SX709407	1959	1968	
ROC Post Maldon	Essex	TL83740710	1960	1968	
ROC Post Mallaig	Inverness-shire	NM675954	1963	1991	
ROC Post Malmesbury	Wiltshire	ST95448547	1962	1968	
ROC Post Malpas	Cheshire	SJ49454795	1962	1991	
ROC Post Malton	Yorkshire	SE7822672252	1961	1968	
ROC Post Manaton	Devonshire	SX764782	Not opened		
ROC Post Manea	Cambridgeshire	TL47408890	1961	1968	
ROC Post Manningtree	Essex	TM10153167	1960	1968	
ROC Post Marazion	Cornwall	SW54023029 (Approx)	1958	1968	
ROC Post March	Cambridgeshire	TL40469495	1961	1991	
ROC Post Marchwood	Hampshire	SU39220864	1962	1968	
ROC Post Marianglas Master Post	Anglesey	SH50148395	1960	1968	1981-1991
ROC Post Market Deeping	Lincolnshire	TF14170827	1960	1991	
ROC Post Market Drayton	Shropshire	SJ66023462	1965	1991	
ROC Post Market Rasen	Lincolnshire	TF09058771	1962	1991	
ROC Post Market Weighton	Yorkshire	SE91094162	1960	1968	
ROC Post Markfield	Leicestershire	SK48601080	1966	1968	
ROC Post Markyate	Hertfordshire	TL05741562	1960	1991	
ROC Post Marlow	Buckinghamshire	SU85388695	1960	1968	
ROC Post Marshfield	Gloucestershire	ST77267294	1958	1991	
ROC Post Marston Magna	Somerset	ST59022548	1962	1991	
ROC Post Martham	Norfolk	TG42841666	1958	1968	
ROC Post Medstead	Hampshire	SU66373650	1963	1968	
ROC Post Meikleour	Perthshire	NO16523913	1958	1968	
ROC Post Melbourne	Derbyshire	SK36492497	1961	1968	1975-1991
ROC Post Mellor	Lancashire	SD65723132	1959	1968	
ROC Post Melton Constable	Norfolk	TF04123778	1958	1991	
ROC Post Melton Mowbray	Leicestershire	SK74202169	1959	1968	
ROC Post Melvich	Sutherland	NC875655	1959	1991	
ROC Post Mere	Wiltshire	ST80283506	1965	1991	
ROC Post Meriden	Warwickshire	SP26178245	1965	1991	
ROC Post Merthyr Tydfil	Glamorganshire	SO02810697	1959	1991	
ROC Post Methlick Master Post	Aberdeenshire	NJ87033778	1961	1991	
ROC Post Methven	Perthshire	NO01592652	1964	1991	
ROC Post Mevagissey	Cornwall	SX00684232	1958	1991	
ROC Post Middlesmoor	Yorkshire	SE08557534	1959	1991	
ROC Post Middleton	Norfolk	TF67341598	1960	1968	1989-1991
ROC Post Middleton on the Wolds	Yorkshire	SE94125045	1960	1968	
ROC Post Middleton Stoney	Oxfordshire	SP54182374	1959	1991	
ROC Post Middlewich	Cheshire	SJ70856629	1965	1991	
ROC Post Midhurst	Sussex	SU86571962	1960	1968	
ROC Post Milford	Surrey	SU94704310	1960	1968	
ROC Post Millbrook Master Post	Cornwall	SX43255152	1960	1991	
ROC Post Milfield	Northumberland	NT93043457	1960	1991	
ROC Post Millom	Cumberland	SD17687908	1964	1968	
ROC Post Milnathort	Kinross-shire	NO09690383	1960	1991	
ROC Post Milngavie	Dunbartonshire	NS553757	1961	1968	
ROC Post Milnthorpe	Westmorland	SD48508050	1965	1968	
ROC Post Minard	Argyllshire	NR97599658	1960	1991	
ROC Post Minehead	Somerset	SS94284741 (Possible)	1961	1968	
ROC Post Minster	Kent	TR31546568	1962	1991	
ROC Post Minsterley	Shropshire	SJ37190538	65	1991	
ROC Post Mitchell	Cornwall	SW84175368	1963	1991	
ROC Post Modbury Master Post	Devonshire	SX67665468	1959	1991	
ROC Post Mold	Flintshire	SJ24336191	1964	1968	
ROC Post Moniaive	Dumfriesshire	NX76969018	1962	1975	
ROC Post Montgomery	Montgomeryshire	SO21939660	1960	1968	
ROC Post Morebattle	Roxburghshire	NT77752480	1961	1991	
ROC Post Moretonhampstead	Devonshire	SX74128454	1959	1968	
ROC Post Mortlake	Surrey	TQ21117476	1966	1968	
ROC Post Moulton Chapel	Lincolnshire	TF32271772	1960	1968	
ROC Post Mountain Ash	Glamorganshire	ST05479669	1961	1991	
ROC Post Much Hadham	Hertfordshire	TL43591995	1962	1991	
ROC Post Much Wenlock	Shropshire	SO61399859	1961	1991	
ROC Post Muckhart	Perthshire	NO00740158	1960	1968	
ROC Post Muirkirk Master Post	Ayrshire	NS69292800	1959	1991	
ROC Post Mundesley	Norfolk	TG30173672	1960	1991	
ROC Post Mundford	Norfolk	TL80669516	1961	1991	
ROC Post Nairn	Nairn	NH898568	1961	1968	
ROC Post Nanpean	Cornwall	SW9745399	1959	1968	
ROC Post Nantglyn	Denbighshire	SJ00516299	1966	1968	
ROC Post Napton-on-the-Hill	Warwickshire	SP45926137	1959	1968	
ROC Post Narberth	Pembrokeshire	SN11121240	1960	1991	
ROC Post Narborough	Norfolk	TF74100728	1959	1991	
ROC Post Navenby	Lincolnshire	SK98345473	1958	1991	
ROC Post Nazeing	Essex	TL42250622	1960	1968	
ROC Post Nefyn	Caernarvonshire	SH27844074	1960	1991	
ROC Post Nesscliffe	Shropshire	SJ38851869	1965	1991	
ROC Post Neston	Cheshire	SJ31487962	1963	1991	
ROC Post New Buckenham	Norfolk	TM09639073	1960	1968	
ROC Post New Cumnock	Ayrshire	NS61671342	1964	1991	
ROC Post New Deer	Aberdeenshire	NJ88554656	1958	1968	
ROC Post New Luce	Wigtownshire	NX17746608	1959	1991	
ROC Post New Malden	Surrey	TQ21226967	1963	1968	
ROC Post New Mills / New Oakley	Fife	NT02778983	1965	Before 1977	
ROC Post New Milton	Hampshire	SZ23319306	1960	1968	
ROC Post New Radnor	Radnorshire	SO21736083	1962	1991	
ROC Post Newark-on-Trent	Nottinghamshire	SK75555714	1963	1991	
ROC Post Newbigging Master Post	Angus	NO51253767	1961	1991	
ROC Post Newborough	Anglesey	SH41836532	1960	1991	
ROC Post Newburgh, Aberdeenshire	Aberdeenshire	NJ99532524	1961	1968	
ROC Post Newburgh, Fife	Fife	NO24201844	1961	1991	
ROC Post Newbury	Berkshire	SU45146514	1958	1991	
ROC Post Newcastle Emlyn Master Post	Cardiganshire	SN31014182	1958	1991	
ROC Post Newhaven	Sussex	TQ44430005	1965	1968	
ROC Post Newick	Sussex	TQ41962271	1965	1968	
ROC Post Newport, Monmouthshire	Monmouthshire	ST28879023	1962	1991	
ROC Post Newport, Pembrokeshire	Pembrokeshire	SN04403899	1960	1968	
ROC Post Newport, Hampshire - 1	Hampshire	SZ496878	1961	1961	
ROC Post Newport, Hampshire - 2	Hampshire	SZ51838910	1962	1991	
ROC Post New Quay	Cardiganshire	SN38296010	1959	1991	
ROC Post Newquay	Cornwall	SW84966384	1961	1968	
ROC Post Newton Abbot	Devonshire	SX84346911	1962	1968	
ROC Post Newton Stewart	Wigtownshire	NX40406537	1963	1968	
ROC Post Newtown	Montgomeryshire	SO11429225	1961	1991	
ROC Post Newtownards	Down	IJ45917489	1961	1968	
ROC Post Newtownstewart	Tyrone	IH40318715	1957	1991	
ROC Post Newtyle	Angus	NO285417	1963	1958	
ROC Post Ninfield	Sussex	TQ69981278	1962	1991	
ROC Post Niton IOW	Hampshire	SZ50757612	1962	1991	
ROC Post Norham-on-Tweed	Northumberland	NT90684626	1960	1991	
ROC Post North Berwick	Lothian (East)	NT56108432	1959	1991	
ROC Post North Cerney	Gloucestershire	SP02990822	1962	1991	
ROC Post North Kelsey	Lincolnshire	TA05390130	1959	1991	
ROC Post North Somercotes	Lincolnshire	TF44749468	1964	1968	
ROC Post North Stainley	Yorkshire	SE27037636	1959	1991	
ROC Post North Walsham	Norfolk	TG24513253	1957	1968	
ROC Post Northallerton	Yorkshire	SE384912	1961	1991	
ROC Post Northiam	Sussex	TQ82482537	1961	1991	
ROC Post Northleach	Gloucestershire	SP09641467	1962	1968	
ROC Post Northolt	London & Middlesex	TQ09388505	1967	1991	
ROC Post Northwich	Cheshire	SJ67287225	1965	1968	
ROC Post Oakengates	Shropshire	SJ69351014	1961	1991	
ROC Post Oare	Kent	TR00196282	1961	1968	
ROC Post Oban	Argyllshire	NM907356	1960	1968	
ROC Post Odiham	Hampshire	SU744491	1961	1968	
ROC Post Offley	Hertfordshire	TL13582711	1959	1991	
ROC Post Ogbourne St George	Wiltshire	SU215756	1961	1968	
ROC Post Okehampton	Devonshire	SX53939398	1962	1968	
ROC Post Old Leake	Lincolnshire	TF44804887	1963	1968	
ROC Post Olney Master Post	Buckinghamshire	SP89154570	1964	1991	
ROC Post Omagh	Tyrone	IH46767423	Unknown	1968	
ROC Post Ombersley	Worcestershire	SO84746364	1961	1991	
ROC Post Onich	Inverness-shire	NN02556145	1963	1991	
ROC Post Orford	Suffolk	TM41064928	1961	1968	
ROC Post Orsett	Essex	TQ64408115	1959	1968	
ROC Post Osmotherley	Yorkshire	SE455977	1959	1968	
ROC Post Oswestry	Shropshire	SJ29672989	1961	1968	
ROC Post Otterburn	Northumberland	NY90949504	1963	1991	
ROC Post Otterham	Cornwall	SX14758845	1962	1991	
ROC Post Oundle	Northamptonshire	TL08708616	1964	1968	
ROC Post Out Newton	Yorkshire	TA36952430	1965	1968	
ROC Post Overton, Flintshire	Flintshire	SJ37374414	1965	1991	
ROC Post Overton, Hampshire	Hampshire	SU52074977	1960	1991	
ROC Post Oxshott	Surrey	TQ14636230	1962	1968	
ROC Post Oxton Master Post	Berwickshire	NT47745761	1963	1991	
ROC Post Padiham Master Post	Lancashire	SD79603461	1963	1991	
ROC Post Pagham	Sussex	SU89410034	1963	1968	
ROC Post Paignton	Devonshire	SX84666089	1963	1968	
ROC Post Pakefield	Suffolk	TM53578813	1957	1968	
ROC Post Par	Cornwall	SX10305554	1961	1991	
ROC Post Parbold	Lancashire	SD52751251	1962	1968	
ROC Post Parkgate	Dumfriesshire	NY04569090	1964	1991	
ROC Post Park Street Master Post	Hertfordshire	TL15390420	1961	1968	
ROC Post Parson Drove	Cambridgeshire	TF37920964	1960	1991	
ROC Post Parton	Kirkcudbrightshire	NX68867036	1960	1991	
ROC Post Pattingham	Shropshire	SO81789705	1963	1991	
ROC Post Pavenham	Bedfordshire	SP97145557	1964	1991	
ROC Post Peacehaven	Sussex	TQ41430062	Not underground	Not underground	
ROC Post Peat Inn	Fife	NO45990979	1960	1968	
ROC Post Peebles	Peebles-shire	NT24544102	1959	1991	
ROC Post Peel	Isle of Man	SC25648470	1968	1991	
ROC Post Pen-y-Groes	Caernarvonshire	SH47535343	1964	1991	
ROC Post Penarth	Glamorganshire	ST18586903	1962	1975	
ROC Post Pencader	Carmarthenshire	SN45133706	1961	1991	
ROC Post Penclawdd	Glamorganshire	SS53939537	1960	1991	
ROC Post Pencoed	Glamorganshire	SS96307913	1961	1991	
ROC Post Pencombe Master Post	Herefordshire	S061795314	1961	1991	
ROC Post Penhow	Monmouthshire	ST41409038	1961	1991	
ROC Post Penicuik	Lothian (Mid)	NT23405763	1961	1991	
ROC Post Penmachno	Caernarvonshire	SH79345056	1963	1968	
ROC Post Penmaen	Glamorganshire	SS53788852	1966	1968	
ROC Post Penrith Master Post	Cumberland	NY50412911	1960	1991	
ROC Post Penryn Master Post	Cornwall	SW75863530	1958	1991	
ROC Post Penshurst	Kent	TQ52614705	1965	1991	
ROC Post Pentrefoelas	Denbighshire	SH87075108	1958	1991	
ROC Post Pentyrch	Glamorganshire	ST09948245	1961	1968	
ROC Post Penyffordd	Flintshire	SJ30916217	1958	1968	
ROC Post Pershore	Worcestershire	SO94004653	1961	1968	
ROC Post Peterchurch Master Post	Herefordshire	SO36213934	1961	1991	
ROC Post Petworth	Sussex	SU95981592	1966	1968	
ROC Post Pevensey	Sussex	TQ64580275	1962	1991	
ROC Post Pickering	Yorkshire	SE79298444	1961	1991	
ROC Post Piercebridge	Durham	NZ23321525	1960	1968	
ROC Post Pinhoe Master Post	Devonshire	SX99689326	1962	1991	
ROC Post Pit House	Durham	NZ201399	1959	1968	
ROC Post Pitcaple	Aberdeenshire	NJ71812600	1961	1991	
ROC Post Pleasley Hill	Nottinghamshire	SK50856443	1961	1968	
ROC Post Pluckley	Kent	TQ92174593	1961	1991	
ROC Post Plympton	Devonshire	SX53095781	1958	1968	
ROC Post Plymstock	Devonshire	SX49945178	1964	1991	
ROC Post Pocklington	Yorkshire	SE84235080	1960	1991	
ROC Post Polesworth	Staffordshire	SK244022	1962	1983	
ROC Post Polperro	Cornwall	SX20985492	1960	1968	
ROC Post Pomeroy	Tyrone	IH70307178	Unknown	1968	
ROC Post Pontardulais	Glamorganshire	SN58130435	1962	1968	
ROC Post Ponteland	Northumberland	NZ15606954	1962	1991	
ROC Post Ponterwyd	Cardiganshire	SN75228203	1963	1991	
ROC Post Pontrilas	Herefordshire	S0 38772692	1961	1991	
ROC Post Pontypool	Monmouthshire	SO29370063	1961	1975	
ROC Post Pontypridd	Glamorganshire	ST06728873	1960	1968	
ROC Post Port Ellen	Argyllshire	NR 32395173	1965	1991	
ROC Post Port William	Wigtownshire	NX34274301	1961	1968	before 1987-1991
ROC Post Portadown Master Post	Armagh	IH96565760	1960	1968	
ROC Post Portaferry	Down	IJ60034918	1958	1968	
ROC Post Porthcawl	Glamorganshire	SS80807747	1961	1991	
ROC Post Portishead	Somerset	ST44837585	1964	1968	
ROC Post Portland Bill	Dorsetshire	SY68087119	1960	1991	
ROC Post Portlethen	Kincardineshire	NO92419615	1961	1991	
ROC Post Portmadoc	Caernarvonshire	SH55993726	1960	1968	
ROC Post Portobello	Mid Lothian	NT305705	1962	1968	
ROC Post Portpatrick	Wigtownshire	NX00465378	1957	1968	
ROC Post Portree	Isle of Skye	NG47204481	1966	1991	
ROC Post Portsoy	Banffshire	NJ60696611	1960	1968	
ROC Post Poulton	Gloucestershire	SP10050202	1962	1968	
ROC Post Powick	Worcestershire	SO82775194	1962	1991	
ROC Post Powrie Brae	Angus	NO42383489	1957	1968	
ROC Post Poynton	Cheshire	SJ93208262	1962	1991	
ROC Post Praze-An-Beeble	Cornwall	SW67323665	1961	1968	
ROC Post Prees	Shropshire	SJ560331	1965	1968	
ROC Post Prestatyn	Flintshire	SJ07918186	1961	1991	
ROC Post Preston	Dorsetshire	SY70868190	1961	1968	
ROC Post Preston on the Hill	Cheshire	SJ571819	1965	1968	
ROC Post Prestwich	Lancashire	SD83230475	1958	1991	
ROC Post Prestwick	Ayrshire	NS344251	1957	1958	
ROC Post Princes Risborough	Buckinghamshire	SP80200170	1964	1968	
ROC Post Prudhoe	Northumberland	NZ09186233	1962	1991	
ROC Post Pulborough	Sussex	TQ06431952	1968	1991	
ROC Post Puriton	Somerset	ST29144307	1963	1968	

== See also ==
- Commandant Royal Observer Corps
- Aircraft recognition
- Royal Observer Corps Monitoring Post
- Operational instruments of the Royal Observer Corps
- AWDREY
- Bomb Power Indicator
- Ground Zero Indicator
- Fixed Survey Meter
- United Kingdom Warning and Monitoring Organisation
- Four-minute warning
- Royal Observer Corps Medal
- Skywatch march
- RAF Bentley Priory
- Aircraft Identity Corps (Canada)
- Volunteer Air Observers Corps (Australia)
- Ground Observer Corps (USA)
- Civil Air Patrol (USA)
- List of ROC Group Headquarters and UKWMO Sector controls
