= List of Royal Observer Corps / United Kingdom Warning and Monitoring Organisation Posts (F–K) =

This is a list of Royal Observer Corps (ROC) nuclear monitoring posts incorporated into the United Kingdom Warning and Monitoring Organisation (UKWMO).

- List of Royal Observer Corps / United Kingdom Warning and Monitoring Organisation Posts (A–E)
- List of Royal Observer Corps / United Kingdom Warning and Monitoring Organisation Posts (F–K)
- List of Royal Observer Corps / United Kingdom Warning and Monitoring Organisation Posts (L–P)
- List of Royal Observer Corps / United Kingdom Warning and Monitoring Organisation Posts (Q–Z)

Notes:-

- 1. Many of these underground bunkers still exist under private ownership.
- 2. With a few exceptions the surviving bunkers are in varying states of dereliction and are unsafe.
- 3. Counties listed are contemporary which may differ from present counties.

data from:-

List
Post Location	County	Ordnance Survey National Grid reference	1st Opening	1st Closing	2nd Opening	2nd Closing
ROC Post Faddiley	Cheshire	SJ58735313	01/04/59	01/10/68		
ROC Post Fairlight	Sussex	TQ86141121	01/12/60	01/09/91		
ROC Post Fakenham	Norfolk	TF95622927	01/12/58	01/10/68		
ROC Post Falkland	Fife	NO25850753	01/04/63	01/10/68		
ROC Post Farnham	Surrey	SU83724942	01/05/57	01/09/91		
ROC Post Farningham	Kent	TQ53356700	01/05/63	01/10/68		
ROC Post Farnsfield	Nottinghamshire	SK63565848	01/09/61	01/09/91		
ROC Post Farway Common	Devon	SY172987	01/07/59	01/10/68		
ROC Post Fearn	Ross & Cromarty	NH86427602	01/08/59	01/09/91		
ROC Post Felixstowe	Suffolk	TM29313311	01/06/62	01/10/68		
ROC Post Fenham Hill	Northumberland	NU07594288	1 January 1964	01/10/68		
ROC Post Feniton	Devon	ST104404	01/06/59	01/10/68		
ROC Post Fern	Angus	NO48446212	01/04/60	01/10/58		
ROC Post Fernhurst	Sussex	SU89982837	01/09/59	01/09/91		
ROC Post Feughside	Kincardineshire	NO64219202	01/02/59	01/09/91		
ROC Post Fforest Fach	Glamorganshire	SS618942	01/10/62	01/10/68		
ROC Post Finchingfield	Essex	TL69563273	01/11/61	After 1976		
ROC Post Findhorn	Morayshire	NJ03856482	01/02/59	01/09/91		
ROC Post Fishguard	Pembrokeshire	SM95373585	01/07/63	01/10/68		
ROC Post Five Barrows	Devon	SS73253681 (probable)	01/09/59	01/10/68		
ROC Post Fivemiletown	Tyrone	IH40914768	01/08/57	01/10/68		
ROC Post Flamborough	Yorkshire	TA24437059	01/09/60	01/10/68		
ROC Post Fleckney	Leicestershire	SP63739306	01/10/60	01/09/91		
ROC Post Fleetwood	Lancashire	SD32584823	01/06/65	01/09/91		
ROC Post Fleggburgh	Norfolk	TG45891129	01/03/62	01/09/91		
ROC Post Flookburgh Master Post	Lancashire	SD36787519	01/06/65	01/09/91		
ROC Post Folkestone 1st Site	Kent	TR24103661	1961	1960s		
ROC Post Folkestone 2nd Site Master Post	Kent	TR20533826	1960s	01/09/91		
ROC Post Fontmell Magna	Dorsetshire	ST86381811	01/02/1962	01/09/91		
ROC Post Fordham	Cambridgeshire	TL60117738	01/04/1961	01/09/91		
ROC Post Fordingbridge Master Post	Hampshire	SU16731415	1 January 1962	01/09/91		
ROC Post Forfar	Angus	NO459491	01/04/63	01/10/58		
ROC Post Formby	Lancashire	SD27740553	01/07/62	ca1966 to 1968		
ROC Post Fort Augustus	Inverness-shire	NH37410804	01/09/62	01/09/91		
ROC Post Fort William Master Post	Inverness-shire	NN10977563	01/09/60	01/09/91		
ROC Post Forth Master Post	Lanarkshire	NS93345532	01/10/59	01/09/91		
ROC Post Forton	Lancashire	SD49635040	01/06/65	01/09/91		
ROC Post Fortrose	Ross & Cromarty	NH74665577	01/05/61	01/09/91		
ROC Post Fosdyke	Lincolnshire	TF30533488	01/10/64	01/10/68		
ROC Post Foulness (L2)	Essex	TR00459293	01/06/60	01/10/68	1 January 1971	01/09/91
ROC Post Fownhope	Herefordshire	SO59223402	01/11/61	01/10/68		
ROC Post Framfield	Sussex	TQ50982037	01/03/60	01/10/68		
ROC Post Framingham Earl	Norfolk	TG25030242	01/06/60	01/10/68		
ROC Post Frankley	Worcestershire	SP00242792	01/08/60	01/09/91		
ROC Post Frant	Sussex	TQ59073577	01/10/61	01/09/91		
ROC Post Freethorpe	Norfolk	TG41360544	01/12/59	01/10/68		
ROC Post Freshwater Master Post	Hampshire	SZ35278575	1 January 1959	01/09/91		
ROC Post Friockheim	Angus	NO610495	1 January 1962	01/10/58		
ROC Post Friskney	Lincolnshire	TF49425424	1 January 1965	01/10/68		
ROC Post Frome	Somerset	ST76424854	01/05/62	01/09/91		
ROC Post Froxfield Green Master Post	Hampshire	SU72762580	01/04/59	01/09/91		
ROC Post Fulford Site 1	Yorkshire	SE61144811	01/10/61	01/12/73		
ROC Post Fulford Site 2	Yorkshire	SE61784980	01/12/73	01/09/91		
ROC Post Fulstow	Lincolnshire	TF340971	01/03/61	01/09/91		
ROC Post Fyvie	Aberdeenshire	NJ77243785	01/06/59	01/09/91		
ROC Post Gainsborough	Lincolnshire	SK82068913	01/12/61	01/10/68		
ROC Post Gairloch	Ross & Cromarty	NG79747795	01/12/64	01/09/91		
ROC Post Galashiels	Selkirkshire	NT50243666	01/11/59	01/10/68		
ROC Post Gara Bridge	Devon	SX76255325	1960	01/10/68		
ROC Post Garboldisham	Norfolk	TM01488160	01/08/61	01/09/91		
ROC Post Gardenstown	Banffshire	NJ80376447	01/04/60	01/10/68		
ROC Post Garelochhead	Dunbartonshire	NS23669270	01/06/59	01/10/68		
ROC Post Gargrave	Yorkshire	SD937529	01/05/62	01/09/91		
ROC Post Garlieston	Wigtownshire	NX46544665	1 January 1963	Before 1987		
ROC Post Garvald	East Lothian	NT57907038	01/05/63	01/09/91		
ROC Post Garve	Ross & Cromarty	NH39226276	01/10/65	01/09/91		
ROC Post Gatehouse of Fleet	Kirkcudbrightshire	NX60815634	01/08/59	01/10/68		
ROC Post Gauldry	Fife	NO36412392	01/02/58	01/10/68		
ROC Post Gilberdyke	Yorkshire	SE83822755	01/12/58	01/09/91		
ROC Post Gilbertfield	Lanarkshire	NS65385806	01/03/66	01/09/91		
ROC Post Gilsland	Northumberland	NY63926597	01/10/61	01/09/91		
ROC Post Girvan	Ayrshire	NX18969496	01/09/65	01/09/91		
ROC Post Glamis	Angus	NO37114704	01/04/60	01/09/91		
ROC Post Glasgow	Lanarkshire	NS53176539	01/08/60	01/09/91		
ROC Post Glastonbury	Somerset	ST49213815	01/09/59	01/10/68		
ROC Post Glenarm	Antrim	ID33231375	1 January 1961	01/10/68		
ROC Post Glenbarr	Argyllshire	NR67123711	01/12/60	01/10/68		
ROC Post Glenferness	Nairn	NH96364467	01/06/61	01/09/91		
ROC Post Glenfinnan	Inverness-shire	NM900805	01/03/63	01/09/91		
ROC Post Glenisla	Angus	NO221605	01/12/57	01/10/68		
ROC Post Glossop	Derbyshire	SK04409459	01/06/65	01/09/91		
ROC Post Gnosall	Staffordshire	SJ84152107	01/10/58	01/09/91		
ROC Post Goathland	Yorkshire	NZ83920136	01/05/63	01/09/91		
ROC Post Goldthorpe	Yorkshire	SE45240437	01/05/61	01/10/68		
ROC Post Good Easter	Essex	TL62901170	01/10/59	01/10/68	1975	01/09/91
ROC Post Gordon Master Post	Berwickshire	NT68804363	01/05/63	01/09/91		
ROC Post Gorebridge	Mid Lothian	NT377583	01/12/59	01/10/68		
ROC Post Gorthleck	Inverness-shire	NH489155	1963	01/09/91		
ROC Post Gourock	Renfrewshire	NS23827713	01/05/60	01/09/91		
ROC Post Grange	Banffshire	NJ52125275	01/06/60	01/09/91		
ROC Post Grantham	Lincolnshire	SK90193299	01/08/58	01/09/91		
ROC Post Grantown-on-Spey	Morayshire	NJ03902821	01/11/62	01/09/91		
ROC Post Grantshouse	Berwickshire	NT816649	01/05/61	01/10/68		
ROC Post Grasmere	Westmorland	NY33161075	01/12/64	01/09/91		
ROC Post Grassington	Yorkshire	SD99406367	01/06/62	01/09/91		
ROC Post Grateley	Hampshire	SU26834083	01/06/61	01/09/91		
ROC Post Great Ayton	Yorkshire	NZ54351215	01/11/65	01/09/91		
ROC Post Great Baddow	Essex	TL74020552	01/11/61	01/10/68		
ROC Post Great Bedwyn	Wiltshire	SU28286528	01/08/61	01/09/91		
ROC Post Great Bolas	Shropshire	SJ63002105	01/05/65	01/09/91		
ROC Post Great Crosby	Lancashire	SD29970067	1960	01/10/68		
ROC Post Great Dunmow	Essex	TL64532445	1 January 1959	01/09/91		
ROC Post Great Hockham	Norfolk	TL95609300	01/08/59	01/10/68		
ROC Post Great Missenden	Buckinghamshire	SP92350212	01/12/61	01/09/91		
ROC Post Great Offley Master Post	Hertfordshire	TL13582711	01/07/59	01/09/91		
ROC Post Great Shefford	Berkshire	SU37617392	01/07/60	01/10/68		
ROC Post Great Torrington	Devon	SS53062405	1960	1991		
ROC Post Great Wakering	Essex	TQ95568843	01/09/61	01/10/68		
ROC Post Great Whittington	Northumberland	NZ00817144	01/06/62	01/09/91		
ROC Post Greenfield	Berwickshire	NT94775839	01/02/60	01/09/91		
ROC Post Greenhithe	Kent	TQ60837340	01/12/65	1989		
ROC Post Greenhow Hill	Yorkshire	SE124638	01/06/62	01/10/68		
ROC Post Greg Ness	Kincardineshire	NJ95270261	01/09/60	01/10/68		
ROC Post Gressenhall	Norfolk	TF95521878	01/09/59	01/09/91		
ROC Post Greystoke	Cumberland	NY44713097	01/11/60	01/10/68		
ROC Post Groomsport Master Post	Down	IJ52788364	01/05/61	01/09/91		
ROC Post Grundisburgh	Suffolk	TM23065137	01/04/60	01/10/68		
ROC Post Guiseley	Yorkshire	SE20064424	01/07/58	01/09/91		
ROC Post Guist	Norfolk	TG00452730	01/12/58	01/10/68		
ROC Post Hackthorn	Lincolnshire	SK99687894	Unknown	01/09/91		
ROC Post Hadleigh	Suffolk	TM035425	01/04/61	01/09/91		
ROC Post Hailey	Oxfordshire	SP34781297	01/06/59	01/09/91		
ROC Post Halesworth	Suffolk	TM40117883	01/09/60	01/10/68		
ROC Post Halkirk	Caithness	ND13255770	01/06/61	01/10/68		
ROC Post Hallen	Gloucestershire	ST55208004	01/09/60	01/09/91		
ROC Post Hambledon	Hampshire	SU64971472	01/04/59	01/09/91		
ROC Post Hamstreet	Kent	TR00683331	01/11/61	01/09/91		
ROC Post Sixpenny Handley	Dorsetshire	ST99591749	01/10/60	01/10/68		
ROC Post Harbottle	Northumberland	NT93640575	01/12/60	01/09/91		
ROC Post Harbury	Warwickshire	SP36005968	01/10/60	01/10/68		
ROC Post Harby	Leicestershire	SK74553065	01/02/60	01/09/91		
ROC Post Harewood	Yorkshire	SE32734525	01/05/58	01/10/68		
ROC Post Harewood End	Herefordshire	SO52842738	01/07/61	01/09/91		
ROC Post Harlaston	Staffordshire	SK19640978	1961	01/09/91		
ROC Post Harleston	Norfolk	TM25628262	01/03/58	01/10/68		
ROC Post Harold Wood	Essex	TQ52489269	01/10/60	01/10/68		
ROC Post Harris	Ross & Cromarty	NB15440017	Unknown	01/09/91		
ROC Post Harston	Cambridgeshire	TL43224998	Unknown	01/10/68		
ROC Post Hartburn	Northumberland	NZ09858557	01/08/60	01/09/91		
ROC Post Hartest	Suffolk	TL83955224	1 January 1960	01/10/68		
ROC Post Hartfield	Sussex	TQ47883451	01/05/60	01/10/68		
ROC Post Hart Heugh	Northumberland	NT98542526	01/02/64	01/09/91		
ROC Post Hartington	Derbyshire	SK12945995	1 January 1958	01/09/91		
ROC Post Hartlepool	Durham	NZ48533368	01/05/62	01/09/91		
ROC Post Haseley Knob	Warwickshire	SP25887105	01/11/64	01/09/91		
ROC Post Hastings Hill	Durham	NZ35295442	01/06/59	ca1975		
ROC Post Hatch Beauchamp	Somerset	ST31192175	01/10/62	01/10/68		
ROC Post Hatfield Broad Oak	Essex	TL54271568	01/02/60	01/10/68		
ROC Post Hatfield Peverel	Essex	TL80121253	01/07/59	01/10/68		
ROC Post Hatherleigh	Devon	SS54410712	01/11/61	01/10/68		
ROC Post Havant	Hampshire	SU68540649	1 January 1968	01/09/91		
ROC Post Haverfordwest	Pembrokeshire	SN01361554	01/07/62	01/09/91		
ROC Post Haverhill	Suffolk	TL67644619	01/09/59	01/10/68		
ROC Post Hawes	Yorkshire	SD86858973	01/05/63	01/09/91		
ROC Post Hawkshead	Lancashire	SD35169793	01/10/65	01/09/91		
ROC Post Hay-on-Wye	Breconshire	SO22444321	01/04/59	01/09/91		
ROC Post Haydon Bridge	Northumberland	NY83886598	1 January 1961	01/09/91		
ROC Post Hayling Island	Hampshire	SU73280059	1 January 1964	01/10/68		
ROC Post Headcorn	Kent	TQ82964461	01/11/61	01/10/68		
ROC Post Headley	Surrey	TQ20475402	01/04/66	01/10/68		
ROC Post Heckington	Lincolnshire	TF18534534	01/02/63	01/10/68		
ROC Post Heckmondwike	Yorkshire	SE21362522	01/10/59	01/09/91		
ROC Post Hellesdon	Norfolk	TG20111119	01/12/59	01/09/91		
ROC Post Helmsley	Yorkshire	SE57428131	01/05/58	01/10/68		
ROC Post Helsby Master Post	Cheshire	SJ49247544	01/10/62	01/09/91		
ROC Post Helston	Cornwall	SW64862727	01/04/58	01/09/91		
ROC Post Henfield	Sussex	TQ22291624	01/07/64	01/10/68		
ROC Post Henham	Essex	TL54812811	01/11/61	01/09/91		
ROC Post Henley-in-Arden	Warwickshire	SP15486607	1960	01/10/68		
ROC Post Herne Bay Master Post	Kent	TR17136498	01/09/65	01/10/68	1976	01/09/91
ROC Post Herriard	Hampshire	SU67254454	01/03/59	01/09/91		
ROC Post Herstmonceux	Sussex	TQ61961183	1 January 1962	01/10/68		
ROC Post Hertford	Hertfordshire	TL29321459	1 January 1961	01/09/91		
ROC Post Heysham	Lancashire	SD40896013	01/11/61	01/09/91		
ROC Post High Bentham	Yorkshire	SD68816927	01/06/65	01/09/91		
ROC Post High Bickington	Devon	SS603203	01/04/61	01/10/68		
ROC Post Highworth	Wiltshire	SU19429237	01/09/59	01/10/68		
ROC Post Hill	Gloucestershire	ST643953	01/12/62	01/10/68		
ROC Post Hill Head	Hampshire	SU52730283	01/08/61	01/10/68		
ROC Post Hillsborough Master Post	Down	IJ23645570	Unknown	Unknown	by 1982	01/09/91
ROC Post Hinderwell	Yorkshire	NZ79311781	01/06/60	01/09/91		
ROC Post Hingham	Norfolk	TG03840193	01/12/57	01/10/68		
ROC Post Hirwaun	Glamorganshire	SN95110609	01/10/59	01/10/68		
ROC Post Hoar Cross	Staffordshire	SK14402312	01/06/59	01/10/68		
ROC Post Hog's Back	Surrey	SU975486	01/08/57	01/10/68		
ROC Post Holbeach	Lincolnshire	TF36452635	01/10/64	01/09/91		
ROC Post Holbeton	Devon	SX60354883	01/08/63	01/10/68		
ROC Post Holford	Somerset	ST16194286	01/06/62	01/09/91		
ROC Post Holme-on-Spalding-Moor	Yorkshire	SE82213868	01/05/60	01/09/91		
ROC Post Holmfirth	Yorkshire	SE15660429	1 January 1964	01/09/91		
ROC Post Holmwood	Surrey	TQ17204550	1 January 1960	01/09/91		
ROC Post Holsworthy	Devon	SS34990386	01/06/60	01/09/91		
ROC Post Holywell	Flintshire	SJ18537504	01/04/64	01/09/91		
ROC Post Holywood	Down	IJ41487764	01/06/61	01/10/68		
ROC Post Honingham	Norfolk	TG09231020	01/03/62	01/09/91		
ROC Post Honington, Lincs	Lincolnshire	SK92744502	01/04/65	01/10/68		
ROC Post Honington, Suffolk	Suffolk	TL947729	01/06/61	01/10/68		
ROC Post Hoo Master Post	Kent	TQ77837344	01/10/60	01/09/91		
ROC Post Hope	Derbyshire	SK13997964	01/12/62	01/10/68		
ROC Post Hopton	Suffolk	TG53729898	1961	01/10/68		
ROC Post Horden	Durham	NZ45483900 (probable)	01/04/62	01/10/68		
ROC Post Horns Cross	Devon	SS37532361	01/06/60	01/10/68		
ROC Post Hornsea	Yorkshire	TA203493	01/12/58	01/10/68		
ROC Post Horsham	Sussex	TQ17882979	01/12/61	01/09/91		
ROC Post Horsmonden	Kent	TQ69823851	01/05/60	01/10/68		
ROC Post Horton-in-Ribblesdale	Yorkshire	SD81037230	01/06/65	01/09/91		
ROC Post Hounslow	London & Middlesex	TQ089749	01/07/66	01/10/68		
ROC Post Hovingham	Yorkshire	SE66677489	01/04/59	01/10/68		
ROC Post Howden	Yorkshire	SE77022772	01/05/63	01/10/68		
ROC Post Hucknall	Nottinghamshire	SK51494908	01/03/64	01/09/91		
ROC Post Hulland	Derbyshire	SK27964642	01/11/59	01/10/68		
ROC Post Humberston	Lincolnshire	TA32630576	01/09/63	01/10/68		
ROC Post Humbie	East Lothian	NT45736324	1 January 1961	01/10/68		
ROC Post Hunmanby	Yorkshire	TA06557878	Unknown	01/10/68		
ROC Post Hunslet	Yorkshire	SE31892785 (probable)	01/06/62	01/10/68		
ROC Post Hunstanton	Norfolk	TF67584201	01/11/57	01/10/68		
ROC Post Huntly	Aberdeenshire	NJ54553859	01/03/58	01/09/91		
ROC Post Hurstbourne Tarrant	Hampshire	SU37535257	Unknown	01/09/91		
ROC Post Hyde	Cheshire	SJ95789260	01/12/62	01/10/68		
ROC Post Ickleton	Essex	TL47594154	01/07/59	Before 1991		
ROC Post Ingoldsby	Lincolnshire	TF01122956	1959	01/10/68		
ROC Post Inkberrow	Worcestershire	SP01095696	01/12/62	01/09/91		
ROC Post Inverallochy	Aberdeenshire	NK02726456	01/02/61	01/10/68		
ROC Post Inveraray	Argyllshire	NN081070	01/10/60	01/10/58		
ROC Post Inverbervie	Kincardineshire	NO824727	01/09/61	01/10/68		
ROC Post Invergarry	Inverness-shire	NN29899839	01/09/60	01/09/91		
ROC Post Invergordon	Ross & Cromarty	NH68276916	01/05/65	01/09/91		
ROC Post Inverkeilor	Angus	NO68425013	01/04/60	01/09/91		
ROC Post Inverkeithing	Fife	NT132809	01/06/59	01/10/68		
ROC Post Inverness	Inverness-shire	NH67234692	01/05/61	01/10/68		
ROC Post Ipstones	Staffordshire	SK01625012	01/11/58	01/09/91		
ROC Post Irvinestown	Fermanagh	IH24516125	Unknown	01/10/68		
ROC Post Isleham	Suffolk	TL69047543	01/08/59	01/10/68		
ROC Post Jedburgh	Roxburghshire	NT63521956	01/09/61	01/09/91		
ROC Post Jerretts Pass	Down	IJ073322	01/12/57	01/09/91		
ROC Post John o' Groats	Caithness	ND40557325	01/09/59	01/09/91		
ROC Post Joppa Master Post	Ayrshire	NS41891953	01/03/61	01/09/91		
ROC Post Keighley	Yorkshire	SE03664237	01/05/62	01/09/91		
ROC Post Kelso	Roxburghshire	NT74393738	01/04/60	01/09/91		
ROC Post Kelty Master Post	Fife	NT14989145	01/04/63	01/09/91		
ROC Post Kelvedon	Essex	TL85581913	01/05/60	01/10/68		
ROC Post Kemble	Wiltshire	ST96729643	01/03/62	01/09/91		
ROC Post Kendal	Westmorland	SD52509164	01/05/65	01/09/91		
ROC Post Kennethmont	Aberdeenshire	NJ54922869	01/06/59	01/10/68		
ROC Post Kentford	Suffolk	TL71516540	01/08/59	01/10/68	1975	01/09/91
ROC Post Kentisbeare	Devon	ST05220700	01/06/62	01/09/91		
ROC Post Kenton	Northumberland	NZ21496748	01/02/62	01/10/68		
ROC Post Kesh	Fermanagh	IH18176728	01/09/57	01/09/91		
ROC Post Kessingland	Suffolk	TM52818404	01/06/61	01/10/68		
ROC Post Kettering	Northamptonshire	SP86137523	Unknown	01/09/91		
ROC Post Keyingham	Yorkshire	TA25402443	01/11/65	01/09/91		
ROC Post Keynsham	Somerset	ST66756586	01/12/57	01/10/68		
ROC Post Kidlington	Oxfordshire	SP49871316	01/06/59	01/10/68		
ROC Post Kidwelly Master Post	Carmarthenshire	SN41590641	01/06/60	01/09/91		
ROC Post Kielder	Northumberland	NY63109186	01/03/61	01/09/91		
ROC Post Kilchattan Bay Master Post	Buteshire	NS08215611	01/09/61	01/09/91		
ROC Post Kildonan Master Post	Buteshire	NS03922193	01/12/62	01/09/91		
ROC Post Kildrummy	Aberdeenshire	NJ467179	01/04/60	01/10/68		
ROC Post Kilkeel	Down	IJ325148	01/09/59	Mid 1980s		
ROC Post Kilkhampton Master Post	Cornwall	SS25811340	01/10/61	01/09/91		
ROC Post Killearn	Stirlingshire	NS52958657	01/03/60	01/09/91		
ROC Post Killin	Perthshire	NN57613308	01/08/60	01/09/91		
ROC Post Kilmarnock Master Post	Ayrshire	NS45153966	01/03/61	01/09/91		
ROC Post Kilnsea	Yorkshire	TA415160	Unknown	01/10/68		
ROC Post Kilrea	Londonderry	IC89251277	01/02/62	01/09/91		
ROC Post Kilskerry	Tyrone	IH29625536	01/08/57	01/10/68		
ROC Post Kilwinning	Ayrshire	NS323421	01/08/65	01/10/58		
ROC Post Kimpton	Hertfordshire	TL18171786	01/11/58	01/10/68		
ROC Post Kinbrace	Sutherland	NC85593117	01/11/59	01/09/91		
ROC Post King's Lynn	Norfolk	TF60272274	01/10/60	ca1989		
ROC Post Kinghorn	Fife	NT26618669 (possible)	1 January 1959	01/10/68		
ROC Post Kings Langley Master Post	Hertfordshire	TL06570187	01/11/59	01/09/91		
ROC Post Kings Worthy	Hampshire	SU49453361	01/10/60	01/09/91		
ROC Post Kingsclere	Hampshire	SU52795839	01/06/60	01/10/68		
ROC Post Kingsdown	Kent	TR37604918	01/12/66	01/09/91		
ROC Post Kingsgate	Kent	TR39517092	01/06/61	01/10/68	Unknown	01/09/91
ROC Post Kingston St. Mary	Somerset	ST23173039	01/04/62	01/09/91		
ROC Post Kingussie	Inverness-shire	NH77280115	01/04/61	01/09/91		
ROC Post Kinlochewe	Perthshire	NN66015794	01/10/60	01/09/91		
ROC Post Kinloch Rannoch	Ross & Cromarty	NH030616	01/05/61	01/10/68		
ROC Post Kintore Master Post	Aberdeenshire	NJ79681554	01/06/61	01/10/68	ca1977	01/09/91
ROC Post Kippen	Stirlingshire	NS63519423	01/05/61	?		
ROC Post Kirby Hill	Yorkshire	SE37346960	01/07/58	01/09/91		
ROC Post Kirby Moorside	Yorkshire	SE66779102	01/05/58	01/09/91		
ROC Post Kirkbean	Kirkcudbrightshire	NX97535995	01/10/59	01/09/91		
ROC Post Kirkbride	Cumberland	NY22845828	01/05/62	1973		
ROC Post Kirkby Lonsdale	Westmorland	SD60257878	01/06/65	01/09/91		
ROC Post Kirkby Stephen	Westmorland	NY77809088	01/11/62	01/09/91		
ROC Post Kirkcowan	Wigtownshire	NX32196125	01/11/59	01/09/91		
ROC Post Kirkcudbright Master Post	Kirkcudbrightshire	NX704517	1 January 1964	01/09/91		
ROC Post Kirkgunzeon	Kirkcudbrightshire	NX869671	01/12/61	01/10/68		
ROC Post Kirkintilloch	Stirlingshire	NS67097573	01/04/63	01/09/91		
ROC Post Kirkliston	West Lothian	NT111743	01/12/63	01/10/68		
ROC Post Kirkmichael	Perthshire	NO09025962	01/10/62	01/09/91		
ROC Post Kirkwall	Orkney	HY41071159	01/06/60	01/09/91		
ROC Post Kirtlebridge	Dumfriesshire	NY21747301	01/10/61	01/09/91		
ROC Post Knaresborough	Yorkshire	SE361594	01/05/60	01/10/68		
ROC Post Knighton	Radnorshire	SO29997161	01/10/62	01/09/91		
ROC Post Knockholt	Unknown	Unknown	Unknown	Unknown	Unknown	Unknown
ROC Post Knutsford	Cheshire	SJ74847945	01/11/59	01/09/91		
ROC Post Kyle of Lochalsh-1	Ross & Cromarty	NG781314	01/09/60	01/08/62		
ROC Post Kyle of Lochalsh-2	Ross & Cromarty	NG77933090	01/03/64	01/09/91		

== See also ==
- Aircraft recognition
- Operational instruments of the Royal Observer Corps
- AWDREY
- Bomb Power Indicator
- Ground Zero Indicator
- Fixed Survey Meter
- Four-minute warning
- Royal Observer Corps Medal
- Skywatch march
- RAF Bentley Priory
- Volunteer Air Observers Corps (Australia)
- List of ROC Group Headquarters and UKWMO Sector controls
