= List of ROC Group Headquarters and UKWMO Sector controls =

This is a list of the locations for former Royal Observer Corps (ROC) Group Headquarters and the United Kingdom Warning and Monitoring Organisation (UKWMO) sector controls that received information from ROC posts by dedicated GPO/BT landlines. Clusters of posts also had VHF radio communications with HQs and sector controls, in case of land-line failure, from the cluster Master Posts.

The Royal Observer Corps was a civil defence organisation operating in the United Kingdom between 29 October 1925 and 31 December 1995, when the Corps' civilian volunteers were stood down. (ROC headquarters staff at RAF Bentley Priory stood down on 31 March 1996). Composed mainly of civilian spare-time volunteers, ROC personnel wore a Royal Air Force (RAF) style uniform and latterly came under the administrative control of RAF Strike Command and the operational control of the Home Office. Civilian volunteers were trained and administered by a small cadre of professional full-time officers under the command of the Commandant Royal Observer Corps; latterly a serving RAF Air Commodore.

== ROC Group Headquarters ==
- ROC Group No. 1 - Maidstone
- ROC Group No. 2 - Horsham
- ROC Group No. 3 - Oxford
- ROC Group No. 4 - Colchester
- ROC Group No. 5 - Watford
- ROC Group No. 6 - Norwich
- ROC Group No. 7 - Bedford
- ROC Group No. 8 - Coventry
- ROC Group No. 9 - Yeovil
- ROC Group No. 10 - Exeter
- ROC Group No. 11 - Truro
- ROC Group No. 12 - Bristol
- ROC Group No. 13 - South Wales
- ROC Group No. 14 - Winchester
- ROC Group No. 15 - Lincoln - (RAF Fiskerton)
- ROC Group No. 16 - Shrewsbury
- ROC Group No. 17 - North Wales (RAF Wrexham)
- ROC Group No. 18 - Leeds
- ROC Group No. 19 - Manchester
- ROC Group No. 20 - York
- ROC Group No. 21 - Preston (Goosnargh)
- ROC Group No. 22 - Carlisle (RAF Carlisle)
- ROC Group No. 23 - Durham
- ROC Group No. 24 - Edinburgh (RAF Turnhouse)
  - 1953 - 1964 Barnton Quarry
- ROC Group No. 25 - Ayr
- ROC Group No. 27 - Oban
- ROC Group No. 28 - Dundee
- ROC Group No. 29 - Aberdeen
- ROC Group No. 30 - Inverness
- ROC Group No. 31 - Belfast (Thiepval Barracks)
  - 1954-1959 Castlereagh, Belfast

== UKWMO Sectors and groups ==
Metropolitan sector

- 1 Group - Maidstone (group headquarters at Ashmore House, Maidstone)
- 2 Group - Horsham (sector headquarters)
- 3 Group - Oxford (peacetime national headquarters)
- 4 Group - Colchester
- 14 Group - Winchester

Midlands sector

- 6 Group - Norwich (group headquarters at Old Catton)
- 7 Group - Bedford
- 8 Group - Coventry (group headquarters at Lawford Heath)
- 15 Group - Lincoln (group and sector headquarters at RAF Fiskerton)
- 20 Group - York (group headquarters at Acomb)

Southern sector

- 9 Group - Yeovil
- 10 Group - Exeter (group headquarters at Poltimore Park)
- 12 Group - Bristol (group and sector headquarters at Lansdown, Bath)
- 13 Group - Carmarthen

Western sector

- 16 Group - Shrewsbury
- 17 Group - Wrexham (group headquarters at RAF Wrexham)
- 21 Group - Preston (sector headquarters - wartime national headquarters)
- 22 Group - Carlisle (group headquarters at RAF Carlisle)
- 31 Group - Belfast (group headquarters at Thiepval Barracks)

Caledonian sector

- 24 Group - Edinburgh (group headquarters at RAF Turnhouse)
- 25 Group - Ayr
- 28 Group - Dundee (group headquarters at Craigiebarns)
  - 1964 - 1976 School Hill, Aberdeenshire
- 29 Group - Aberdeen (group headquarters at Northfield)
- 30 Group - Inverness (group headquarters at Raigmore)

== Map of ROC Group Headquarters and UKWMO Sector Controls ==
Map of the United Kingdom showing former ROC Group Headquarters and United Kingdom Warning and Monitoring Organisation Sector and Group Controls.

ROC Group Headquarters and UKWMO Sector Headquarters
ROC Group Headquarters

== See also ==
- Commandant Royal Observer Corps
- Aircraft recognition
- Royal Observer Corps Monitoring Post
- Operational instruments of the Royal Observer Corps
- AWDREY
- Bomb Power Indicator
- Ground Zero Indicator
- Fixed Survey Meter
- United Kingdom Warning and Monitoring Organisation
- Four-minute warning
- Royal Observer Corps Medal
- Skywatch march
- RAF Bentley Priory
- List of Royal Observer Corps / United Kingdom Warning and Monitoring Organisation Posts (A-E)
- List of Royal Observer Corps / United Kingdom Warning and Monitoring Organisation Posts (F-K)
- List of Royal Observer Corps / United Kingdom Warning and Monitoring Organisation Posts (L-P)
- List of Royal Observer Corps / United Kingdom Warning and Monitoring Organisation Posts (Q-Z)
