= List of Royal Observer Corps / United Kingdom Warning and Monitoring Organisation Posts (A–E) =

This is a list of Royal Observer Corps (ROC) nuclear monitoring posts incorporated into the United Kingdom Warning and Monitoring Organisation (UKWMO).

- List of Royal Observer Corps / United Kingdom Warning and Monitoring Organisation Posts (A–E)
- List of Royal Observer Corps / United Kingdom Warning and Monitoring Organisation Posts (F–K)
- List of Royal Observer Corps / United Kingdom Warning and Monitoring Organisation Posts (L–P)
- List of Royal Observer Corps / United Kingdom Warning and Monitoring Organisation Posts (Q–Z)

Notes:-

- 1. Many of these underground bunkers still exist under private ownership, permission of the owner is paramount before attempting to locate them.
- 2. With a few exceptions, the surviving bunkers are in varying states of dereliction and should be considered unsafe.
- 3. Counties listed are contemporary which may differ from present counties.

List
Post Location	OS National Grid reference	County	1st Opening	1st Closing	2nd Opening	2nd Closing
ROC Post Abbots Ripton	TL191773	Huntingdonshire	Unknown	1968		
ROC Post Abbotsbury	SY56028624	Dorsetshire	1959	1968		
ROC Post Aberangell	SH85381053	Montgomeryshire	1966	1991		
ROC Post Aberchirder	NJ61955635	Banffshire	1960	1991		
ROC Post Abercrave	SN81371282	Breconshire	1965	1991		
ROC Post Aberdaron	SH16722647	Caernarvonshire	1960	1991		
ROC Post Aberdovey	SN61119619	Merionethshire	1964	1968		
ROC Post Aberfeldy	NN85714894	Perthshire	1960	1991		
ROC Post Aberfoyle	NN52010145	Perthshire	1959	1968		
ROC Post Abergavenny	SO32331445	Monmouthshire	1964	1968	1973	1991
ROC Post Abergwesyn	SN85945312	Breconshire	1961	1968		
ROC Post Aberlady	NT47478272	East Lothian	1959	1968		
ROC Post Aberlemno	NO52525491	Angus	1961	1968		
ROC Post Abernyte	NO25683216	Perthshire	1961	1991		
ROC Post Aberporth	SN22605052	Cardiganshire	1960	1968		
ROC Post Abersoch	SH30182893	Caernarvonshire	1960	1968		
ROC Post Aberystwyth	SN59618290	Cardiganshire	1966	1968		
ROC Post Abington	NS92172510	Lanarkshire	1964	1991		
ROC Post Achnasheen	NH17625890	Ross & Cromarty	1961	1991		
ROC Post Acton	TQ16038185	London & Middlesex	1961	1968		
ROC Post Airdrie	NS77756691	Lanarkshire	1959	1991		
ROC Post Aldbrough	TA26403863	Yorkshire	1958	1975		
ROC Post Aldeburgh	TM476607	Suffolk	1959	1968		
ROC Post Aldeby	TM43389320	Norfolk	1959	1968		
ROC Post Alderbury	SU207248	Wiltshire	1961	1991		
ROC Post Alderminster	SP252443	Warwickshire	1963	1968		
ROC Post Alderton	TM34744089	Suffolk	1960	1991		
ROC Post Aldford	SJ41725862	Cheshire	1960	1991		
ROC Post Alexandria Master Post	NS40527994	Dunbartonshire	1961	1991		
ROC Post Alford	NJ56541639	Aberdeenshire	1962	1991		
ROC Post Alford	TF41017412	Lincolnshire	1961	1991		
ROC Post Allhallows	TQ83257773	Kent	1961	1968		
ROC Post Alloa	NS88539394 (approx)	Clackmannanshire	1962	1971		
ROC Post Allonby Master Post	NY08594298	Cumberland	1960	1991		
ROC Post Alston	NY72284621	Cumberland	1961	1991		
ROC Post Altnaharra	NC56993580	Sutherland	1960	1991		
ROC Post Altrincham	SJ71478879	Cheshire	1965	1991		
ROC Post Alyth	NO234475	Perthshire	1960	1991		
ROC Post Ambergate Master Post	SK35425108	Derbyshire	By 1982	1991		
ROC Post Amesbury	SU15983863	Wiltshire	1964	1991		
ROC Post Amlwch	SH43919317	Anglesey	1959	1968	1981	1991
ROC Post River Amman	SN69891207	Glamorganshire	1959	1991		
ROC Post Ampthill	TL02803787	Bedfordshire	1963	1991		
ROC Post Andoversford	SP04902195	Gloucestershire	1963	1991		
ROC Post Appin Master Post	NM91004573	Argyllshire	1960	1991		
ROC Post Appleby-in-Westmorland	NY67452002	Westmorland	1960	1991		
ROC Post Arborfield	SU75856626	Berkshire	1961	1968		
ROC Post Arbroath	NO62113983	Angus	1958	1991		
ROC Post Ardgay	NH59309071	Ross & Cromarty	1959	1991		
ROC Post Ardglass	IJ53003495	Down	1957	1968	by 1987	1991
ROC Post Arduaine Master Post	NM82290647	Argyllshire	1960	1991		
ROC Post Ardvasar	NG655069	Isle of Skye	1961	1991		
ROC Post Arisaig	NM64238790	Inverness-shire	1963	1968		
ROC Post Upper Arley	SO793800	Worcestershire	1961	1968		
ROC Post Armagh	IH91064596	Armagh	1957	1991		
ROC Post Armathwaite	NY48614626	Cumberland	1965	1968		
ROC Post Arrington	TL32115021	Cambridgeshire	1961	1991		
ROC Post Arrochar	NN29700528	Dunbartonshire	1960	1991		
ROC Post Ascot	SU92286947	Berkshire	1962	1968		
ROC Post Ash	TR29915814	Kent	1962	1968		
ROC Post Ashburton	SX75376826	Devonshire	1963	1991		
ROC Post Ashbury Master Post	SU27128458	Berkshire	1960	1991		
ROC Post Ashkirk	NT50341995	Roxburghshire	1959	1991		
ROC Post Ashover Master Post	SK35846366	Derbyshire	1959	1991		
ROC Post Ashwell	TL26943877	Hertfordshire	1960	1991		
ROC Post Askern	SE57331445	Yorkshire	1961	1968		
ROC Post Athelstaneford	NT51457608	East Lothian	1965	1968		
ROC Post Atherton	SD69090435	Lancashire	1959	1991		
ROC Post Auchenblae	NO72837859	Kincardineshire	1962	1991		
ROC Post Auchenmalg	NX22735179	Wigtownshire	1959	1968		
ROC Post Audlem	SJ66104485	Cheshire	1965	1991		
ROC Post Auldgirth	NX916873	Dumfriesshire	1959	1968	1975	1991
ROC Post Aultbea	NG865892	Ross & Cromarty	1959	1968		
ROC Post Avebury	SU10386922	Wiltshire	1961	1991		
ROC Post Aviemore	NH89841360	Inverness-shire	1968	1991		
ROC Post Axminster	ST28790014	Devonshire	1962	1968		
ROC Post Aycliffe Village	NZ291211	Durham	1963	1968		
ROC Post Aylsham	TG18682532	Norfolk	1961	1991		
ROC Post Aysgarth	SE00618792	Yorkshire	1965	1991		
ROC Post Backbarrow	SD36038335	Lancashire	1965	1968		
ROC Post Bacton	TM06236666	Suffolk	1958	1991		
ROC Post Bacup Master Post	SD86442281	Lancashire	1965	1991		
ROC Post Badingham	TM31826774	Suffolk	1959	1968		
ROC Post Bala	SH916359	Merionethshire	1963	1981		
ROC Post Balerno	NT16446523	Mid Lothian	1961	1968		
ROC Post Ballantrae	NX08458147	Ayrshire	1963	1968	1974	1991
ROC Post Ballater	NO36429534	Aberdeenshire	1959	1991		
ROC Post Ballycastle	ID07594285	Antrim	1957	1991		
ROC Post Ballyclare	IJ288922	Antrim	1957	1968		
ROC Post Ballymena Master Post	ID09660568	Antrim	1957	1991		
ROC Post Ballymoney	IC98092359	Antrim	1957	1968		
ROC Post Ballynahinch	IJ34244927	Down	1957	1991		
ROC Post Ballywalter	IJ63446597	Down	1957	1991		
ROC Post Bamburgh	NU16573496	Northumberland	1963	1991		
ROC Post Bampton	NY52091748	Westmorland	1963	1991		
ROC Post Bampton	SS97371875	Devonshire	1961	1991		
ROC Post Banbridge	IJ15044842	Down	1957	1991		
ROC Post Bangor	SH57937114	Caernarvonshire	1959	1991		
ROC Post Bankfoot	NO080348	Perthshire	1960	1968		
ROC Post Bannockburn	NS81968995	Stirlingshire	1961	1991		
ROC Post Bardney	TF12416898	Lincolnshire	1960	1991		
ROC Post Barford	SP28615991	Warwickshire	1959	1968	1969	1991
ROC Post Bargoed	ST13799925	Glamorganshire	1963	1968		
ROC Post Bargrennan	NX34797726	Wigtownshire	1964	1991		
ROC Post Barham	TR21695096	Kent	1960	1991		
ROC Post Barkston Ash	SE486362	Yorkshire	1957	1989		
ROC Post Barmouth	SH60171806	Merionethshire	1965	1968		
ROC Post Barnby	TM46258783	Suffolk	1960	1991		
ROC Post Barningham (Note: village transferred from North Riding of Yorkshire to Country Durham on 1 April 1974)	NZ07811157	Yorkshire	1962	1968		
ROC Post Barnstaple	SS58232957	Devonshire	1959	1968		
ROC Post Barnwood	SO87501493	Gloucestershire	1959	1970		
ROC Post Barr	NX27409306	Ayrshire	1963	1968		
ROC Post Barrhead	NS49305932	Renfrewshire	1965	1991		
ROC Post Barrhill	NX22148158	Ayrshire	1959	1974		
ROC Post Barrock Master Post	ND20527645	Caithness	1959	1991		
ROC Post Barrow-in-Furness Master Post	SD17386894	Lancashire	Unknown	1991		
ROC Post Barton-upon-Humber	TA02982028	Lincolnshire	1959	1968		
ROC Post Barwick-in-Elmet	SE38793658	Yorkshire	1962	1991		
ROC Post Baslow	SK24037226	Derbyshire	1963	1968		
ROC Post Bassenthwaite	NY22913283	Cumberland	1961	1991		
ROC Post Bathgate	NS988688	West Lothian	1959	1968		
ROC Post Baumber	TF22887337	Lincolnshire	1961	1991		
ROC Post Beaconsfield	SU92458934	Buckinghamshire	1958	1991		
ROC Post Bearsted	TQ79545598	Kent	1962	1968		
ROC Post Beattock	NT08480335	Dumfriesshire	1964	1991		
ROC Post Beauchief	SK32618126	Yorkshire	1959	1991		
ROC Post Beauly Master Post	NH51784718	Inverness-shire	1961	1991		
ROC Post Bedale	SE27118874	Yorkshire	1959	1991		
ROC Post Beddgelert	SH58274868	Caernarvonshire	1963	1991		
ROC Post Bedworth	SP379856	Warwickshire	Unknown	1991		
ROC Post Beith	NS34075503	Ayrshire	1960	1968		
ROC Post Bellingham	NY84718381	Northumberland	1961	1991		
ROC Post Benefield	SP96048991	Northamptonshire	1958	1991		
ROC Post Bentpath	NY29569002	Dumfriesshire	1959	1968		
ROC Post Benwick	TL338888	Cambridgeshire	1960	1968		
ROC Post Beragh	IH51236664	Tyrone	1957	1991		
ROC Post Bere Alston	SX45496522	Devonshire	1961	1991		
ROC Post Bere Regis	SY85729470	Dorsetshire	1963	1991		
ROC Post Berkhamsted	SP98810911	Hertfordshire	1960	1968		
ROC Post Berwick-upon-Tweed	NT979548	Berwickshire	1964	1968		
ROC Post Bethersden	TQ92934058	Kent	1962	1968		
ROC Post Bettyhill	NC700627	Sutherland	1959	1968		
ROC Post Beverley	TA00923854	Yorkshire	1964	1991		
ROC Post Bewerley	SE05975223	Yorkshire	1963	1968		
ROC Post Beyton	TL94216272	Suffolk	1958	1991		
ROC Post Bidford-on-Avon	SP11125207	Warwickshire	1960	1991		
ROC Post Billericay	TQ669915	Essex	1963	1991		
ROC Post Billesdon	SK71610206	Leicestershire	1959	1968		
ROC Post Billingborough	TF10663345	Lincolnshire	1963	1991		
ROC Post Billinge Hill	SD52510141	Lancashire	1960	1968		
ROC Post Billinghay	TF13445602	Lincolnshire	1961	1991		
ROC Post Billingshurst	TQ09652583	Sussex	1958	1968		
ROC Post Binbrook	TF22379401	Lincolnshire	1959	1968		
ROC Post Birchington	TR28036934	Kent	1968	1968		
ROC Post Birdsall	SE86136736	Yorkshire	1962	1991		
ROC Post Birstall	SK58961077	Leicestershire	1964	1991		
ROC Post Bishop Norton	SK98169211	Lincolnshire	1959	1968		
ROC Post Blackford	NN89700959	Perthshire	Unknown	1968		
ROC Post Blaenau Ffestiniog	SH69004513	Merionethshire	1961	1968		
ROC Post Blair Atholl	NN86926652	Perthshire	1960	1991		
ROC Post Blakeney	SO66790604	Gloucestershire	1961	1968		
ROC Post Blakesley	SP62645157	Northamptonshire	Unknown	1968		
ROC Post Blandford Forum	ST87260525	Dorsetshire	1962	1968		
ROC Post Bleadon	ST34525790	Somerset	1959	1991		
ROC Post Blean	TR09656170	Kent	1966	1976		
ROC Post Bletchley	SP877323	Buckinghamshire	1960	1968		
ROC Post Bloxham	SP45163430	Oxfordshire	1960	1991		
ROC Post Blyth	NZ322785	Northumberland	1961	1968		
ROC Post Blyth	SK63488609	Nottinghamshire	1964	1991		
ROC Post Boars Hill	SP48610286	Oxfordshire	1960	1991		
ROC Post Bobbington	SO81199100	Staffordshire	1965	1968		
ROC Post Boddam	NK115430	Aberdeenshire	1961	1968		
ROC Post Bodfari	SJ09647177	Flintshire	1960	1968		
ROC Post Bodmin	SX06776632	Cornwall	1961	1991		
ROC Post Bolton-by-Bowland	SD77655012	Yorkshire	ca1960	1991		
ROC Post Bomere Heath	SJ48492006	Shropshire	1965	1991		
ROC Post Bo'ness	NT004794	West Lothian	1963	1991		
ROC Post Bonnybridge	NS81658076	Stirlingshire	1961	1991		
ROC Post Bootle	SD10448927	Cumberland	1965	1968		
ROC Post Bordon	SU79553391	Hampshire	1963	1991		
ROC Post Boreland	NY18319182	Dumfriesshire	1964	1968		
ROC Post Borough Green	TQ61295727	Kent	1960	1991		
ROC Post Boscobel	SJ83020891	Shropshire	1966	1968		
ROC Post Boston	TF33044861	Lincolnshire	1963	1991		
ROC Post Boston Spa	SE44804257	Yorkshire	1959	1968		
ROC Post Botesdale	TM05377428	Suffolk	1958	1968		
ROC Post Botley Master Post	SU49761169	Hampshire	1962	1991		
ROC Post Bottesford	SK81253971	Leicestershire	1960	1968		
ROC Post Bottisham	TL56006229	Cambridgeshire	1962	1991		
ROC Post Bourne	TF09622267	Lincolnshire	1961	1991		
ROC Post Bow	SS73460276	Devonshire	1963	1968	Unknown	1991
ROC Post Bowes Park	TQ30069035	London & Middlesex	1964	1991		
ROC Post Brackley	SP58423734	Northamptonshire	Unknown	1991		
ROC Post Braco	NN82750890	Perthshire	1968	1991		
ROC Post Bradfield	SU60277124	Berkshire	1968	1991		
ROC Post Bradford-on-Avon	ST824613	Wiltshire	1961	1991		
ROC Post Bradwell-on-Sea (L1)	TM01130732	Essex	1960	1991		
ROC Post Braemar	NO14359102	Aberdeenshire	1962	1991		
ROC Post Braintree	TL78752377	Essex	1959	1968		
ROC Post Bramley	SE23703508	Yorkshire	1962	1968		
ROC Post Brampton	NY53016030	Cumberland	1959	1991		
ROC Post Brancaster	TF77294290	Norfolk	1960	1991		
ROC Post Brandesburton	TA12644800	Yorkshire	1962	1968		
ROC Post Brandsby	SE57297205	Yorkshire	1964	1991		
ROC Post Brassington	SK22795523	Derbyshire	1964	1991		
ROC Post Brasted	TQ46975664	Kent	1962	1968		
ROC Post Bratton	ST92055098	Wiltshire	1961	1991		
ROC Post Brechin	NO58866087	Angus	1959	1968		
ROC Post Brecon	SO04622708	Breconshire	1962	1991		
ROC Post Brent Pelham	TL42513158	Hertfordshire	1961	1991		
ROC Post Bridge of Earn	NO145178	Perthshire	1964	1968		
ROC Post Bridge of Orchy	NN29964186	Argyllshire	1960	1991		
ROC Post Bridge of Weir	NS37756539	Renfrewshire	1965	1991		
ROC Post Bridgnorth	SO73469318	Shropshire	1961	1968		
ROC Post Bridlington	TA16527124	Yorkshire	1959	1991		
ROC Post Brierley Hill	SO91638958	Staffordshire	1965	1991		
ROC Post Brightlingsea	TM06461871	Essex	1959	1968		
ROC Post Brighton	TQ32990451	Sussex	1962	1991		
ROC Post Brill	SP64021512	Oxfordshire	1958	1968		
ROC Post Brinscall Master Post	SD59302294	Lancashire	1962	1991		
ROC Post Briton Ferry	SS73679407	Glamorganshire	1964	1968		
ROC Post Brixham	SX94465653	Devonshire	1960	1991		
ROC Post Brixworth Master Post	SP75637103	Northamptonshire	1960	1991		
ROC Post Broad Chalke	SU02852545	Wiltshire	Unknown	1991		
ROC Post Broadford Master Post	HG64662333	Isle of Skye	1959	1991		
ROC Post Broad Haven	SM85971314	Pembrokeshire	1960	1991		
ROC Post Broadway	SP11583635	Worcestershire	1960	1991		
ROC Post Brodick	NS03403531	Buteshire	1962	1991		
ROC Post Bromsgrove	SO98207109	Worcestershire	1961	1968		
ROC Post Brookland	TQ98802547	Kent	1962	1968		
ROC Post Brora	NC886022	Sutherland	1959	1991		
ROC Post Broughton-in-Furness Master Post	SD21878892	Lancashire	1965	1991		
ROC Post Brundall	TG34330827	Norfolk	1961	1991		
ROC Post Brusselton	NZ203724988	Durham	1961	1968		
ROC Post Bruton	ST68393443	Somerset	1959	1968		
ROC Post Brymbo	SJ28475320	Denbighshire	1960	1991		
ROC Post Brynmawr	SO18341250	Breconshire	1962	1973		
ROC Post Bubwith	SE71333658	Yorkshire	1961	1968		
ROC Post Buckden	TL19986860	Huntingdonshire	1968	1968		
ROC Post Buckden	SD93647823	Yorkshire	1963	1991		
ROC Post Buckie	NJ40876496	Banffshire	1960	1991		
ROC Post Buckingham	SP703323	Buckinghamshire	1968	1991		
ROC Post Buckland Newton Master Post	ST68000499	Dorsetshire	1958	1991		
ROC Post Buckminster	SK87102206	Leicestershire	1961	1991		
ROC Post Bucksburn	NJ89920945	Aberdeenshire	1960	1968		
ROC Post Builth Wells	SO04825054	Breconshire	1959	1968		
ROC Post Bungay	TM32128650	Suffolk	1962	1991		
ROC Post Burgh-on-Bain	TF21468407	Lincolnshire	1959	1991		
ROC Post Burghill Master Post	SO48344512	Herefordshire	1961	1991		
ROC Post Burscough Master Post	SD42611053	Lancashire	1962	1991		
ROC Post Burton Agnes	TA09466558	Yorkshire	1962	1968		
ROC Post Burton Bradstock	SY47989071	Dorsetshire	1964	1991		
ROC Post Burton Joyce	SK64334483	Nottinghamshire	1961	1991		
ROC Post Burton Pidsea	TA23153149	Yorkshire	1962	1968		
ROC Post Bury St. Edmunds	TL82996245	Suffolk	1962	1991		
ROC Post Bushmills	IC91274115	Antrim	1957	1968		
ROC Post Buxton Master Post	SK08777564	Derbyshire	1959	1991		
ROC Post Byrness	NT78220313	Northumberland	1965	1991		
ROC Post Cabrach	NJ37963098	Banffshire	1960	1991		
ROC Post Caister	TG50601164	Norfolk	1959	1968		
ROC Post Caldbeck	NY33823915	Cumberland	1962	1991		
ROC Post Caldy	SJ23918775	Cheshire	1961	1968		
ROC Post Caledon	IH77384316	Tyrone	1957	1968		
ROC Post Callander	NN63910861	Perthshire	1963	1991		
ROC Post Callington	SX36816912	Cornwall	1960	1991		
ROC Post Camberley	SU91085916	Surrey	1963	1991		
ROC Post Camblesforth	SE64892647	Yorkshire	1961	1991		
ROC Post Canford Cliffs	SZ055889	Dorsetshire	1960	1968		
ROC Post Cannich	NH33803143	Inverness-shire	1962	1991		
ROC Post Canobie	NY402779	Dumfriesshire	1961	1968		
ROC Post Canterbury	TR16445838	Kent	1961	1968		
ROC Post Canvey Island	TQ77268363	Essex	1962	1968		
ROC Post Canwick	TF00226977	Lincolnshire	1962	1968		
ROC Post Capel Curig	SH72045829	Caernarvonshire	1963	1991		
ROC Post Cardigan	SN16544428	Cardiganshire	1960	1991		
ROC Post Carlisle	NY38375920	Cumberland	1961	1991		
ROC Post Carluke	NS86624874	Lanarkshire	1961	1991		
ROC Post Carmarthen	SN41082125	Carmarthenshire	1960	1991		
ROC Post Carno	SN956670	Montgomeryshire	1961	1991		
ROC Post Carnoustie	NO56703595	Angus	1959	1968		
ROC Post Carradale	NR81403894	Argyllshire	1962	1991		
ROC Post Carron	NJ23674412	Morayshire	1962	1991		
ROC Post Carryduff	IJ38306263	Down	1957	1991		
ROC Post Carsphairn Master Post	NX56099335	Kirkcudbrightshire	1962	1991		
ROC Post Carterton	SP25110722	Oxfordshire	1961	1991		
ROC Post Castle Bytham	SK98861760	Lincolnshire	1961	1968		
ROC Post Castledawson	IH90299304	Londonderry	Unknown	1991		
ROC Post Castlederg	IH26758565	Tyrone	Unknown	1968		
ROC Post Castle Douglas	NX768624	Kirkcudbrightshire	1961	1991		
ROC Post Castle Hedingham	TL78933554	Essex	1961	1968		
ROC Post Castleside	NZ08604837	Durham	1962	1991		
ROC Post Castleton	NZ68080750	Yorkshire	1959	1991		
ROC Post Castletown	SC29156917	Isle of Man	1968	1991		
ROC Post Castor	TL13539940	Northamptonshire	1962	1968		
ROC Post Catforth	SD45523682	Lancashire	1963	1991		
ROC Post Caton	SD541649	Lancashire	1962	1968		
ROC Post Catrine	NS526257	Ayrshire	1961	1968		
ROC Post Cawdor	NH86595102	Nairn	1960	1991		
ROC Post Cawood	SE58053894	Yorkshire	1961	Ca1982/3		
ROC Post Caxton	TL30095919	Cambridgeshire	1961	1968		
ROC Post Cerrigydrudion	SH96204929	Denbighshire	1963	1968		
ROC Post Ceunant	SH52996084	Caernarvonshire	1958	1968		
ROC Post Chandlers Ford	SU41301961	Hampshire	1964	1968		
ROC Post Chapel St. Leonards	TF56117347	Lincolnshire	1961	1968		
ROC Post Chard	ST30890913	Somerset	Unknown	1991		
ROC Post Chatton	NU05522868 (probable)	Northumberland	1960	1968		
ROC Post Checkendon	SU66918617	Oxfordshire	1961	1968		
ROC Post Cheddington	SP91451700	Buckinghamshire	1960	1991		
ROC Post Chepstow	ST52849177	Monmouthshire	1962	1968		
ROC Post Cheriton	SU58192809	Hampshire	1959	1991		
ROC Post Cherry Hinton	TL49265458	Cambridgeshire	1961	1991		
ROC Post Cheslyn Hay	SJ96900810	Staffordshire	1960	1991		
ROC Post Cheveley	TL69316249	Suffolk	1962	1974		
ROC Post Chichester / Apuldram / Dell Quay	SU84040274	Sussex	Unknown	1968		
ROC Post Chiddingly	TQ54951337	Sussex	1962	1991		
ROC Post Chigwell	TQ43549478	Essex	1961	1991		
ROC Post Chilton Polden	ST38653817	Somerset	1959	1991		
ROC Post Chinley	SK03648121 (Probable)	Derbyshire	1960	1968		
ROC Post Chippenham	ST90257175	Wiltshire	1958	1991		
ROC Post Chipping Ongar Master Post	TL55980578	Essex	1959	1991		
ROC Post Chipping Warden	SP50515188	Northamptonshire	1962	1991		
ROC Post Chirnside	NT878572	Berwickshire	1960	1968		
ROC Post Chop Gate	SE55769990	Yorkshire	1963	1991		
ROC Post Chorleywood	TQ03169458	Hertfordshire	1959	1968		
ROC Post Chorlton-cum-Hardy	SJ830931	Lancashire	1961	1968		
ROC Post Christchurch	SZ14409515	Hampshire	1959	1991		
ROC Post Christow	SX82928297	Devonshire	1960	1991		
ROC Post Church Gresley	SK27931787	Derbyshire	1959	1991		
ROC Post Church Stretton	SO46489290	Shropshire	1965	1991		
ROC Post Chwilog	SH43953884	Caernarvonshire	1957	1991		
ROC Post Clachan	NR761568	Argyllshire	1962	1958		
ROC Post Clacton	TM16141338	Essex	1961	1968		
ROC Post Clandon	TQ05225071	Surrey	1959	1991		
ROC Post Clarborough	SK74798307	Nottinghamshire	1960	1968		
ROC Post Clare	TL77054385	Essex	1959	1991		
ROC Post Claudy	IC55960963	Londonderry	1957	1968		
ROC Post Claydon	TM13484939	Suffolk	1959	1968		
ROC Post Claypole	SK85044868	Lincolnshire	1960	1991		
ROC Post Clevedon	ST40767195	Somerset	1959	1991		
ROC Post Cley-next-the-Sea	TF06164407	Norfolk	1958	1968		
ROC Post Cliffe	TQ73237653	Kent	1961	1968		
ROC Post Clifton	SK53973366	Nottinghamshire	Unknown	1991		
ROC Post Clipston	SP70248268	Northamptonshire	1959	1991		
ROC Post Clogher	IH547546	Tyrone	1957	1991		
ROC Post Cloughmills Master Post	ID05931976	Antrim	1957	1991		
ROC Post Cloughton	TA00919510	Yorkshire	1962	1968		
ROC Post Clova	NO34147164	Angus	1960	1991		
ROC Post Clows Top	SO71677174	Worcestershire	1959	1968		
ROC Post Clun	SO294810 (probable)	Shropshire	1959	1968		
ROC Post Clutton Master Post	ST64266002	Somerset	1959	1991		
ROC Post Clydach	SN67610055	Glamorganshire	1962	1991		
ROC Post Coad's Green	SX30027685	Cornwall	1960	1968		
ROC Post Cockburnspath Master Post	NT74757249	Berwickshire	1963	1991		
ROC Post Cockermouth	NY11983281	Cumberland	1960	1968		
ROC Post Cockshutt	SJ43232885	Shropshire	1965	1968		
ROC Post Cogenhoe	SP81835726	Northamptonshire	Unknown	1968		
ROC Post Cold Ash	SU51936934	Berkshire	1959	1968		
ROC Post Cold Overton	SK80620968	Leicestershire	1959	1991		
ROC Post Coldstream	NT83854073	Berwickshire	1959	1968		
ROC Post Coleorton	SK38771635	Leicestershire	1959	1968		
ROC Post Coleraine	IC82513376	Londonderry	1957	1991		
ROC Post Colindale	TQ19848813	London & Middlesex	1961	1968		
ROC Post Collingbourne Ducis	SU22635367	Wiltshire	1961	1968		
ROC Post Collingham	SK83816288	Nottinghamshire	1960	1968		
ROC Post Coltishall	TG26111881	Norfolk	1957	1968		
ROC Post Combe Martin	SS628446	Devonshire	1964	1968		
ROC Post Compton	SU79451496	Sussex	1962	1968		
ROC Post Comrie	NN76922020	Perthshire	1960	1991		
ROC Post Coningsby	TF25935634	Lincolnshire	1963	1991		
ROC Post Constantine	SW71892985	Cornwall	1959	1968		
ROC Post Cynwyl Elfed (Convill)	SN34822744	Carmarthenshire	1960	1968		
ROC Post Cooden	TQ75920769	Sussex	1963	1968		
ROC Post Cookstown	IH81267965	Tyrone	1960	1991		
ROC Post Coombes	TM04325702	Suffolk	1964	1968		
ROC Post Copythorne	SU329174	Hampshire	1964	1968		
ROC Post Corby	SP85178964	Northamptonshire	Unknown	1968		
ROC Post Cortachy	NO38436010	Angus	1957	1991		
ROC Post Corwen	SJ05194532	Merionethshire	1965	1991		
ROC Post Cotgrave	SK63053402	Nottinghamshire	1961	1968		
ROC Post Cotherstone	NY99651770	Yorkshire	1965	1991		
ROC Post Cowling	SD98594289	Yorkshire	1963	1968		
ROC Post Crail Master Post	NO60640774	Fife	1959	1968		
ROC Post Cranbrook	TQ76283546	Kent	1968	1991		
ROC Post Cranleigh	TQ01823580	Surrey	1961	1991		
ROC Post Craven Arms	SO42018362	Shropshire	1965	1968		
ROC Post Crawley	TQ25983996	Sussex	1962	1968		
ROC Post Creetown	NX48135675	Kirkcudbrightshire	1959	1968		
ROC Post Crewe	SJ72215208	Cheshire	1964	1968		
ROC Post Crewkerne	ST42900713	Somerset	1961	1991		
ROC Post Crianlarich	NN38272467	Perthshire	1960	1991		
ROC Post Crick	SP57917320	Northamptonshire	Unknown	1968		
ROC Post Cricklade	SU07139182	Wiltshire	1962	1991		
ROC Post Croes-goch	SM82133016	Pembrokeshire	1960	1991		
ROC Post Croft-on-Tees	NZ30880703	Yorkshire	1961	1991		
ROC Post Cromarty	NH80626693	Ross & Cromarty	1961	1968		
ROC Post Cromer	TG23124155	Norfolk	1958	1968		
ROC Post Crossland Moor	SE10601386	Yorkshire	1961	1968		
ROC Post Crowborough	TQ50502947	Sussex	1960	1991		
ROC Post Crowfield	TM15895612	Suffolk	1965	1991		
ROC Post Crowland	TF23130926	Lincolnshire	1962	1968		
ROC Post Crowle	SO91755696	Worcestershire	1960	1968		
ROC Post Crowthorne	SU84496442	Berkshire	1960	1968		
ROC Post Croyde	SS43683830	Devonshire	1961	1991		
ROC Post Cruden Bay Master Post	NK09753555	Aberdeenshire	1959	1991		Master Post
ROC Post Crymmych	SN17943406	Pembrokeshire	1962	1968		
ROC Post Cuckfield	TQ30522439	Sussex	1962	1968	1970	1991
ROC Post Cuckmere Haven	TV49689834	Sussex	1958	1991		
ROC Post Culford	TL84987084	Suffolk	1960	1968		
ROC Post Culgaith	NY61412948	Cumberland	1960	1991		
ROC Post Culham	SU51209494	Oxfordshire	1960	1968		
ROC Post Cummertrees Master Post	NY14456608	Dumfriesshire	1966	1991		
ROC Post Cupar	NO38411495	Fife	1959	1991		
ROC Post Curdworth	SP166932	Warwickshire	1965	1968		
ROC Post Cushendall	ID24473054	Antrim	1958	1991		
ROC Post Dalavich	NM967125	Argyllshire	1960	1968		
ROC Post Dale	SM80222042	Pembrokeshire	1962	1968		
ROC Post Dalkeith	NT36016660	Mid Lothian	1963	1991		
ROC Post Dallas	NJ12595305	Morayshire	1962	1968		
ROC Post Dalmally	NN142277	Argyllshire	1960	1969		
ROC Post Dalmellington	NS46060701	Ayrshire	1966	1968		
ROC Post St. John's Town of Dalry	NX63258140	Kirkcudbrightshire	1964	1991		
ROC Post Dalston	NY38004839	Cumberland	1962	1991		
ROC Post Dalwhinnie	NN63638621	Inverness-shire	1961	1991		
ROC Post Darley	SE21795871	Yorkshire	1960	1991		
ROC Post Darton	SE31891211	Yorkshire	1964	1991		
ROC Post Darvel	NS57253788	Ayrshire	1959	1991		
ROC Post Daventry	SP58786254	Northamptonshire	Unknown	1991		
ROC Post Debenham	TM16946400	Suffolk	1958	1968		
ROC Post Deepdale	TA04738575	Yorkshire	1964	1968		
ROC Post Deerness	HY56910743	Orkney	1960	1991		
ROC Post Dent	SD76498769	Yorkshire	1965	1991		
ROC Post Dersingham	TF69493181	Norfolk	1959	1991		
ROC Post Devizes	SU03296013	Wiltshire	1961	1991		
ROC Post Dingwall	NH555603	Ross & Cromarty	1964	1991		
ROC Post Diss	TM11458085	Norfolk	1960	1991		
ROC Post Ditchling	TQ32341562	Sussex	1962	1970		
ROC Post Ditton Priors	SO60608925	Shropshire	1965	1968		
ROC Post Docking	TF75413689	Norfolk	1961	1968		
ROC Post Dolgellau	SH72861854	Merionethshire	1965	1991		
ROC Post Dorchester	SY68059108	Dorsetshire	Unknown	1991		
ROC Post Dornoch	NH816921	Sutherland	1959	1968		
ROC Post Dorrington	SJ74370278	Shropshire	1961	1968		
ROC Post Douglas	SC405781	Isle of Man	1968	1991		
ROC Post Douglas	NS84423139	Lanarkshire	1964	1991		
ROC Post Doune	NN724024	Perthshire	1962	1968		
ROC Post Dover	TR33784318	Kent	1962	1968		
ROC Post Downderry	SX31445470	Cornwall	1961	1991		
ROC Post Downham Market	TF60070350	Norfolk	1960	1991		
ROC Post Downpatrick	IJ49954773	Down	1960	By 1987		
ROC Post Draperstown	IH76259257	Londonderry	1957	Late 1987		
ROC Post Drewsteignton	SX71219091	Devonshire	1960	1991		
ROC Post Driffield	TA02615887	Yorkshire	1957	1968		
ROC Post Drumadoon	NR89472921	Buteshire	Unknown	1968		
ROC Post Drumbo	IJ30346372	Down	Unknown	1968		
ROC Post Drummuir Master Post	NJ38174438	Banffshire	1960	1991		
ROC Post Drumnadrochit	NH50512927	Inverness-shire	1961	1991		
ROC Post Drumoak	NO78309947	Aberdeenshire	1960	1968		
ROC Post Drumquin	IH33317418	Tyrone	1957	1991		
ROC Post Dryslwyn Master Post	SN54252162	Carmarthenshire	ca1960	1991		
ROC Post Duddington	SK99320064	Northamptonshire	1961	1991		
ROC Post Dulverton	SS88022720	Somerset	1963	1968		
ROC Post Dulwich	TQ31092502	London & Middlesex	1965	1991		
ROC Post Dumfries	NX98307517	Dumfriesshire	1965	1991		
ROC Post Dunbar	NT677761	East Lothian	1963	1968		
ROC Post Dunbeath Master Post	ND12412364	Caithness	1959	1991		
ROC Post Dundrod	IJ24467398	Antrim	1957	ca1984		
ROC Post Dundrum	IJ385355	Down	1959	1968		
ROC Post Dungannon	IH80496387	Tyrone	1957	1991		
ROC Post Dungeness	TR02571997	Kent	1965	1991		
ROC Post Dungiven	IC68400714	Londonderry	1957	1991		
ROC Post Dunham-on-Trent	SK82197391	Lincolnshire	1961	1991		
ROC Post Dunkeld	NO03444327	Perthshire	1961	1991		
ROC Post Dunlop	NS40214942	Ayrshire	1958	1968		
ROC Post Dunning	NO01871403	Perthshire	1960	1991		
ROC Post Duns Master Post	NT75275163	Berwickshire	1964	1991		
ROC Post Dunsop Bridge	SD66084965	Yorkshire	1965	1991		
ROC Post Dunster	ST00534441	Somerset	1962	1991		
ROC Post Dunsyre	NT03524551	Lanarkshire	1965	1968		
ROC Post Dunure	NS26291624	Ayrshire	1958	1968		
ROC Post Dunvegan	NG27584800	Isle of Skye	1962	1968		
ROC Post Durness	NC39426775	Sutherland	1959	1991		
ROC Post Dursley	ST733996	Gloucestershire	1961	1991		
ROC Post Duston	SP71286043	Northamptonshire	1962	1991		
ROC Post Dymchurch	TR10443160	Kent	1962	1991		
ROC Post Dysart	NT292955	Fife	1961	1991		
ROC Post Eaglesham	NS55855187	Renfrewshire	1960	1968		
ROC Post Earls Barton	SP87056471	Northamptonshire	Unknown	1991		
ROC Post Earls Colne	TL85622833	Essex	1960	1991		
ROC Post Easington	NZ42974684	Durham	1962	1991		
ROC Post East Carlton	SP835887	Northamptonshire	Not opened			
ROC Post East Dereham	TF99910949	Norfolk	1958	1968		
ROC Post East Haddon	SP67196787	Northamptonshire	Unknown	1968		
ROC Post East Ilsley	SU48328072	Berkshire	1959	1968		
ROC Post East Kirkby	TF32906321	Lincolnshire	Unknown	1968		
ROC Post East Markham	SK72707363	Nottinghamshire	1961	1991		
ROC Post East Stour	ST77152363	Dorsetshire	1963	1968		
ROC Post Eastchurch	TQ99327091	Kent	1961	1991		
ROC Post Eastoft	SE80521553	Lincolnshire	1965	1991		
ROC Post Eaton Socon	TL16313595	Huntingdonshire	Unknown	1968		
ROC Post Ecclesfield-Hoyland	SK379979	Yorkshire	1965	1968		
ROC Post Echt Master Post	NJ74130526	Aberdeenshire	1959	1991		
ROC Post Edenbridge	TQ45934637	Kent	1960	1968		
ROC Post Edge Hill	SP37404688	Warwickshire	1963	1991		
ROC Post Edwinstowe	SK62406494	Nottinghamshire	1963	1968		
ROC Post Edzell Master Post	NO59376901	Angus	1957	1991		
ROC Post Egglescliffe	NZ43521205 (probable)	Yorkshire	1964	1968		
ROC Post Eglwysfach	SN67679463	Cardiganshire	1965	1968		
ROC Post Elgin	NJ19476073	Morayshire	1962	1991		
ROC Post Elie	NO48300025	Fife	1960	1991		
ROC Post Ellington	NZ28559252	Northumberland	1962	1991		
ROC Post Elloughton	SE95292802	Yorkshire	1958	1968		
ROC Post Elphin	NC21711188	Sutherland	1962	1991		
ROC Post Elstree	TQ18079489	Hertfordshire	1959	1991		
ROC Post Eltham	TQ44207187	Kent	1965	1968		
ROC Post Embleton	NU22642244	Northumberland	1964	1991		
ROC Post Empingham	SK94620946	Rutland	1961	1968		
ROC Post Endon	SJ90815419	Staffordshire	1962	1968		
ROC Post Enfield	TQ28909976	London & Middlesex	1960	1968		
ROC Post Enford	SU13695147	Wiltshire	1959	1968		
ROC Post Enniskillen Master Post	IH26384842	Fermanagh	1957	1991		
ROC Post Enstone	SP37292383	Oxfordshire	1959	1991		
ROC Post Epworth	SE78920440	Lincolnshire	1961	1968		
ROC Post Erdington	SP102917	Warwickshire	1960	1991		
ROC Post Ervie	NX00717121	Wigtownshire	1964	1991		
ROC Post Erwood	SO09424286	Breconshire	1963	1991		
ROC Post Eskdale	SD13520011	Cumberland	1965	1991		
ROC Post Eskdalemuir	NY25049803	Dumfriesshire	1959	1991		
ROC Post Eston	NZ55831769	Yorkshire	1963	1968		
ROC Post Etwall	SK28263217	Derbyshire	1961	1975		
ROC Post Evershot	ST609027	Dorsetshire	1962	1968		
ROC Post Evesham	SP019408	Worcestershire	1963	1968		
ROC Post Exford	SS84023798	Somerset	1961	1991		
ROC Post Exminster	SX910843	Devonshire	1964	1968		
ROC Post Exmouth	SY045813	Devonshire	1960	1968		
ROC Post Eyemouth	NT93016454	Berwickshire	1962	1968		
ROC Post Eythorne	TR29294925	Kent	1960	1968	Unknown	1991

== See also ==
- Commandant Royal Observer Corps
- Aircraft recognition
- Royal Observer Corps Monitoring Post
- Operational instruments of the Royal Observer Corps
- AWDREY
- Bomb Power Indicator
- Ground Zero Indicator
- Fixed Survey Meter
- United Kingdom Warning and Monitoring Organisation
- Four-minute warning
- Royal Observer Corps Medal
- Skywatch march
- RAF Bentley Priory
- Aircraft Identity Corps (Canada)
- Volunteer Air Observers Corps (Australia)
- Ground Observer Corps (USA)
- Civil Air Patrol (USA)
- List of ROC Group Headquarters and UKWMO Sector controls
