= List of Royal Observer Corps / United Kingdom Warning and Monitoring Organisation Posts (Q–Z) =

This is a list of Royal Observer Corps (ROC) nuclear monitoring posts incorporated into the United Kingdom Warning and Monitoring Organisation (UKWMO).

- List of Royal Observer Corps / United Kingdom Warning and Monitoring Organisation Posts (A–E)
- List of Royal Observer Corps / United Kingdom Warning and Monitoring Organisation Posts (F–K)
- List of Royal Observer Corps / United Kingdom Warning and Monitoring Organisation Posts (L–P)

Notes:-

- 1. Many of these underground bunkers still exist under private ownership, permission of the owner is paramount before attempting to locate them.
- 2. With a few exceptions the surviving bunkers are in varying states of dereliction and are unsafe.
- 3. Counties listed are contemporary which may differ from present counties.

data from:- and

Post Location	County	OS National Grid reference	1st Opening	1st Closing	2nd Opening	2nd Closing
ROC Post Quadring Eaudyke	Lincolnshire	TF23553341	1963	1991		
ROC Post Radstock	Somerset	ST68895435	1959	1968		
ROC Post Rainham, Essex	Essex	TQ54948298	Unknown	1991		
ROC Post Rainham, Kent Master Post	Kent	TQ81936456	1961	1968		
ROC Post Ramsey, Cambridgeshire Master Post	Huntingdonshire	TL27418491	1960	1991		
ROC Post Ramsey, Isle of Man	Isle of Man	SC45079692	1968	1991		
ROC Post Randalstown	Antrim	IJ03959389	1958	1991		
ROC Post Rathfriland	Down	IJ18373501	1957	1968		
ROC Post Raunds	Northamptonshire	SP98867438	1961	Before 1991		
ROC Post Ravensden	Bedfordshire	TL08355333	Unknown	1968		
ROC Post Rearsby	Leicestershire	SK66411373	1961	1991		
ROC Post Redcar	Yorkshire	NZ58912518	1959	1991		
ROC Post Redditch	Worcestershire	SP03396897	1963	1968		
ROC Post Redhill	Surrey	TQ29434793	1965	1991		
ROC Post Redrow	Northumberland	NU270004	1961	1968		
ROC Post Reepham	Norfolk	TG08621898	1962	1968		
ROC Post Reeth	Yorkshire	SE04899849	1965	1991		
ROC Post Resolven	Glamorganshire	SN834029	1964	1968		
ROC Post Rhayader	Radnorshire	SN96396740	1963	1968		
ROC Post Rhoose	Glamorganshire	ST06416793	1960	1968	1975	1990
ROC Post Rhosneigr	Anglesey	SH32297369	1960	1968		
ROC Post Rhossilli	Glamorganshire	SS41858832	1962	1968		
ROC Post Richmond	Yorkshire	NZ17050197	1962	1991		
ROC Post Ridgway Cross	Herefordshire	SO722473	1959	1968		
ROC Post Ringwood	Hampshire	SU17470221	1962	1968		
ROC Post Ripley Site 1	Derbyshire	SK40935067 (Probable)	1964	1966		
ROC Post Ripley Site 2	Derbyshire	SK386505	1966	1976		
ROC Post Riseley	Bedfordshire	TL04716260	1964	1991		
ROC Post Roade	Northamptonshire	SP74985156	Unknown	1968		
ROC Post Roadhead Master Post	Cumberland	NY51957481	1961	1991		
ROC Post Robertsbridge	Sussex	TQ74272576	1961	1968		
ROC Post Robin Hood's Bay	Yorkshire	NZ94390620	1961	1968		
ROC Post Rochford	Essex	TQ87739345	1962	1968		
ROC Post Rockcliffe	Kirkcudbrightshire	NX858539	1964	1991		
ROC Post Rodmersham Green	Kent	TQ89886132	1962	1991		
ROC Post Rogate	Sussex	SU80572342	1962	1968		
ROC Post Rosedale	Yorkshire	SE72109460	1962	1968		
ROC Post Rosehearty	Aberdeenshire	NJ93816746	1959	1968		
ROC Post Rossington	Yorkshire	SK62589695	1963	1991		
ROC Post Rothbury	Northumberland	NZ06669907 (probable)	1963	1968		
ROC Post Rotherfield	Sussex	TQ59042672	1963	1968		
ROC Post Roxton	Lincolnshire	TA18341178	1961	1991		
ROC Post Rugeley	Staffordshire	SK06141875	1962	1991		
ROC Post Rushlake Green	Sussex	TQ61432085	1959	1991		
ROC Post Rushton Spencer	Staffordshire	SJ94046315	Unknown	1991		
ROC Post Ruthin	Denbighshire	SJ11195994	1965	1991		
ROC Post Rye Harbour	Sussex	TQ90561965	1961	1968		
ROC Post Sacriston Master Post	County Durham	NX22244798	ca1960	1991		
ROC Post Sadberge	County Durham	NZ33821658	1961	1991		
ROC Post Salen	Argyllshire	NM68736743	1964	1991		
ROC Post Saltash	Cornwall	SX39775870	1959	1968		
ROC Post Saltburn	Yorkshire	NZ65392042	1960	1968		
ROC Post Saltend	Yorkshire	TA18272491	1962	1968		
ROC Post Sambrook	Shropshire	SJ71432435	1965	1968		
ROC Post Sandbach	Cheshire	SJ76386208	1963	1968		
ROC Post Sandhead	Wigtownshire	NX07955282	1964	1991		
ROC Post Sandholme Bank	Yorkshire	TF38083913	1960	1968		
ROC Post Sandown, IOW	Hampshire	SZ61628528	1962	1968		
ROC Post Sandy	Bedfordshire	TL15144968	1964	1991		
ROC Post Sanquhar Master Post	Dumfriesshire	NS78291048	1959	1991		
ROC Post Saughall	Cheshire	SJ36656931	1959	1981		
ROC Post Saundersfoot	Pembrokeshire	SN14320396	1961	1968		
ROC Post Sawley	Yorkshire	SE23756790	1959	1968		
ROC Post Sawtry	Huntingdonshire	TL15828368	1958	1991		
ROC Post Saxmundham	Suffolk	TM39236339	1960	1968		
ROC Post Saxthorpe	Norfolk	TG11572913	1957	1968		
ROC Post Scarborough	Yorkshire	TA04988932	ca1960	1968		
ROC Post Scarinish, Tiree	Argyllshire	NL99514472	1966	1991		
ROC Post Scawby	Lincolnshire	SE95340515	1961	1991		
ROC Post Scone	Perthshire	NO14142706	1958	1991		
ROC Post Scotter	Lincolnshire	SE89630090	1961	1991		
ROC Post Scourie	Sutherland	NC149448	1960	1991		
ROC Post Seascale	Cumberland	NY03590173	1959	1968		
ROC Post Seaton	Devon	SY23389116	1960	1991		
ROC Post Seaton Carew	County Durham	NZ52695855	1960	1968		
ROC Post Seaview	Hampshire	SZ61559216	1962	1968		
ROC Post Sedbergh	Yorkshire (Cumbria)	SD66199229	1965	1968		
ROC Post Sedgefield	County Durham	NZ36473017	1960	1991		
ROC Post Sedlescombe	Sussex	TQ78151857	1961	1968		
ROC Post Seil Island	Argyllshire	NM76871688	1960	1991		
ROC Post Selbourne	Hampshire	SU74733349	1960	1968		
ROC Post Selsey	Sussex	SZ84879483	1963	1991		
ROC Post Sennen	Cornwall	SW35892552	1963	1968		
ROC Post Sennybridge	Breconshire	SN92322865	1959	1968		
ROC Post Settle	Yorkshire	SD81396295	1965	1991		
ROC Post Sevington	Kent	TR04194053	1961	1968		
ROC Post Sharpitor	Devon	SX55657003	1963	1991		
ROC Post Shaw	Greater Manchester	SD92391039	1960	1968		
ROC Post Sheerness	Kent	TQ92677191	1962	1968		
ROC Post Shefford	Bedfordshire	TL15783846	1961	1968		
ROC Post Sheldwich Lees	Kent	TR01585766	1962	1968		
ROC Post Shenstone	Staffordshire	SK11520526	1960	1968	1983	1991
ROC Post Shepshed	Leicestershire	SK49492187	1960	1991		
ROC Post Shepton Mallet	Somerset	ST60384276	1959	1991		
ROC Post Sherburn	Yorkshire	SE96327688	1959	1968		
ROC Post Sherburn Hill	County Durham	NZ33264179	1959	1968		
ROC Post Shilbottle	Northumberland	NU191081	1961	1991		
ROC Post Shiplake	Oxfordshire	SU75997782	1959	1991		
ROC Post Shipton-under-Wychwood	Oxfordshire	SP28711932	1959	1968		
ROC Post Shirley	Warwickshire	SP12907666	1961	1991		
ROC Post Shirwell	Devon	SS56544033	1959	1991		
ROC Post Shotts	Lanarkshire	NS885612	1960	1968		
ROC Post Shrewton	Wiltshire	SU05204473	1963	1968		
ROC Post Shurlock Row	Berkshire	SU81887473	1961	1968		
ROC Post Sidmouth	Devon	SY10968680 (probable)	1962	1991		
ROC Post Silloth	Cumberland	NY10785322	1960	1968		
ROC Post Silverdale	Staffordshire	SJ81414772	1962	1991		
ROC Post Singleton	Sussex	SU88081263	1961	1991		
ROC Post Skegness	Lincolnshire	TF55506559	1964	1991		
ROC Post Skelmorlie	Ayrshire	NS19576494	1965	1991		
ROC Post Skipsea	Yorkshire	TA17565479	1959	1991		
ROC Post Skirlaugh	Yorkshire	TA13604008	1959	1991		
ROC Post Slaley	Northumberland	NY97225798	1961	1991		
ROC Post Slamannan	Stirlingshire	NS86047314	1961	1991		
ROC Post Sleaford	Lincolnshire	TF07654897	1961	1968		
ROC Post Smailholme	Roxburghshire	NT669359	1963	1968		
ROC Post Snodland	Kent	TQ69546106	1962	1968		
ROC Post South Creake	Norfolk	TF85093507	1961	1991		
ROC Post Southery	Norfolk	TL61729460	1959	1991		Southery
ROC Post Southminster	Essex	TQ96359923	1959	1991		
ROC Post South Molton	Devon	SS71262454	1959	1968		
ROC Post Southport	Lancashire	SD32401664	1960	1968		
ROC Post Southsea	Hampshire	SZ63249915	1961	1968		
ROC Post Southwick	Sussex	TQ24000712	1962	1968		
ROC Post Southwold	Suffolk	TM51327755	1961	1968		
ROC Post Sowerby Bridge	Yorkshire	SE05622107	1962	1991		
ROC Post Spalding	Lincolnshire	TF26932127	1964	1968		
ROC Post Spean Bridge	Inverness-shire	NN20938232	1960	1968		
ROC Post Speke	Lancashire	SJ42138326	1959	1968		
ROC Post Spondon	Derbyshire	SK40873789	1963	1968		
ROC Post Springfield	Fermanagh	IH16705056	Unknown	1968		
ROC Post Springwell	County Durham	NZ28565901	1959	1968		
ROC Post St. Abbs Head Master Post	Berwickshire	NT87286828	1963	1991		
ROC Post St. Agnes	Cornwall	SW72734865	1961	1991		
ROC Post St. Andrews	Fife	NO526155	1958	1991		
ROC Post St Anthony-in-Meneage	Cornwall	SW85923251	1960	1968		
ROC Post St. Asaph	Flintshire	SJ02017517	1964	1968		
ROC Post St. Breward Master Post	Cornwall	SX09747753	1960	1991		
ROC Post St. Briavels	Gloucestershire	SO55980395	1961	1991		
ROC Post St. Columb Major Master Post	Cornwall	SW92336232	1964	1991		
ROC Post St. Cyrus	Kincardineshire	NO75186464	1960	1991		
ROC Post St. Fergus	Aberdeenshire	NK10085074	1962	1991		
ROC Post St. Helens	Lancashire	SJ48849444	1965	1991		
ROC Post St. Ives, Cornwall	Cornwall	SW52253799	1962	1968		
ROC Post St. Ives, Huntingdonshire	Huntingdonshire	TL27916883	1959	1991		
ROC Post St. Twynnells	Pembrokeshire	SR94159751	1960	1991		
ROC Post Stadhampton	Oxfordshire	SU62599779	1958	1968		
ROC Post Stalham	Norfolk	TG39162514	1959	1991		
ROC Post Stamford Bridge	Yorkshire	SE68965614	1964	1968		
ROC Post Standon	Staffordshire	SJ81803440	1965	1991		
ROC Post Stanhope	County Durham	NY99104057	1960	1991		
ROC Post Stannington	Northumberland	NZ21248012	1961	1991		
ROC Post Start Point	Devon	SX815379	1957	1968		
ROC Post Staveley	Derbyshire	SK43587591	1964	1968		
ROC Post Staylittle	Montgomeryshire	SN88849218	1960	1968		
ROC Post Steele Road	Roxburghshire	NY51829346	1961	1991		
ROC Post Stepps	Lanarkshire	NS659695	1960	1968		
ROC Post Steyning	Sussex	TQ17381032	1959	1991		
ROC Post Stockbridge Master Post	Hampshire	SU38133528	1962	1968	ca1975 to 1983	1991
ROC Post Stocksbridge	Yorkshire	SK25249708	1964	1991		
ROC Post Stockleigh Pomeroy Master Post	Devon	SS88530313	1959	1991		
ROC Post Stoer	Sutherland	NC04182752	1960	1991		
ROC Post Stoke Ferry	Norfolk	TF69880058	1961	1968		
ROC Post Stoke Golding Master Post	Leicestershire	SP39849667	1960	1991		
ROC Post Stoke Orchard	Gloucestershire	SO93362772	1964	1968		
ROC Post Stoke-under-Ham Also Known As Hamhill	Somerset	ST47811726	1959	1968		
ROC Post Stone Point	Hampshire	SZ45649852	1962	1991		
ROC Post Stonehaven Master Post	Kincardineshire	NO86878287	1962	1991		
ROC Post Stony Stratford	Buckinghamshire	SP775413	1966	1968		
ROC Post Stornoway, Isle of Lewis	Ross & Cromarty	NB44983245	1963	1991		
ROC Post Stottesdon	Shropshire	SO68428262	1965	1991		
ROC Post Stow of Wedale	Mid Lothian	NT46814514	1961	1968		
ROC Post Stow-on-the-Wold	Gloucestershire	SP19182660	1960	1991		
ROC Post Strabane	Tyrone	IH36279724	Unknown	1968		
ROC Post Stradbroke	Suffolk	TM23847415	1959	1991		
ROC Post Straiton Master Post	Ayrshire	NS38200446	1963	1991		
ROC Post Stratfield Turgis Master Post	Hampshire	SU70175902	1960	1991		
ROC Post Stratford	London & Middlesex	TQ41598242	1961	1991		
ROC Post Strathaven Master Post	Lanarkshire	NS708442	1959	1991		
ROC Post Strathdon	ROC Post Aberdeenshire	NJ35091320	1959	1991		
ROC Post Strathyre	Perthshire	NN56342007	1963	1991		
ROC Post Streatley Master Post	Berkshire	SU57428002	1959	1991		
ROC Post Strensall	Yorkshire	SE63696009	1968	1991		
ROC Post Strete	Devon	SX83594693	1959	1991		
ROC Post Stretham	Cambridgeshire	TL51227493	1962	1968		
ROC Post Strichen	Aberdeenshire	NJ94855607	1958	1991		
ROC Post Stromness	Orkney	HY23120999	1960	1991		
ROC Post Strontian	Argyllshire	NM80746242	1958	1963		
ROC Post Stroud	Gloucestershire	SO83030865	1963	1968	1970	1991
ROC Post Sturminster Newton	Dorsetshire	ST79061277	1959	1968		
ROC Post Sturton by Stow	Lincolnshire	SK88507923	1960	1968		
ROC Post Sudbury	Suffolk	TL88594345	1960	1991		
ROC Post Sumburgh Head	Shetland	HU39081268	1961	1991		
ROC Post Sunk Island	Yorkshire	TA29581713	1962	1968		
ROC Post Sutton Master Post	Cambridgeshire	TL44117799	1960	1991		
ROC Post Sutton Bassett	Northamptonshire	SP77669062	1959	1991		
ROC Post Sutton Veney	Wiltshire	ST89784181	1959	1968		
ROC Post Swalcliffe	Oxfordshire	SP37313790	1962	1968		
ROC Post Swaffham	Norfolk	TF82041143	1957	1968		
ROC Post Swallow	Lincolnshire	TA17720252	1959	1968		
ROC Post Sway	Hampshire	SZ29359812	1963	1968		
ROC Post Swindon	Wiltshire	SU11988343	1961	1967		
ROC Post Tain	Ross & Cromarty	NH79328173	1959	1991		
ROC Post Talgarth	Breconshire	SO15903342	1962	1968		
ROC Post Talley	Carmarthenshire	SN63663265	1961	1991		
ROC Post Talybont-on-Usk	Breconshire	SO11022305	1962	1968		
ROC Post Tantobie	County Durham	NZ16785462	1962	By 1977		
ROC Post Tarbert	Argyllshire	NR854681	1962	1991		
ROC Post Tarfside	Angus	NO49208008	1957	1991		
ROC Post Tarland Master Post	Aberdeenshire	NJ48590344	1960	1991		
ROC Post Tarporley	Cheshire	SJ53966386	1965	1991		
ROC Post Tavistock	Devon	SX47537724	1962	1968		
ROC Post Taynuilt Master Post	Argyllshire	NN00123018	1960	1991		
ROC Post Tayport	Fife	NO45442880	1957	1968		
ROC Post Tebay	Westmorland	NY61960467	1962	1991		
ROC Post Teignmouth	Devon	SX91767515	1959	1968		
ROC Post Templecombe	Somerset	ST70042163	1961	1991		
ROC Post Templepatrick Master Post	Antrim	IJ21058846	1957	1991		
ROC Post Tenbury Wells	Shropshire	SO58806929	1962	1968		
ROC Post Tendring	Essex	TM14402464	1959	1991		
ROC Post Tenterden	Kent	TQ87323481	1959	1968		
ROC Post Tetford	Lincolnshire	TF33067629	1960	1968		
ROC Post Teviotdale	Roxburghshire	NT39470426	Unknown	1991		
ROC Post Thame	Oxfordshire	SP72060592	1959	1991		
ROC Post Thankerton	Lanarkshire	NS97173768	1959	1991		
ROC Post The Lizard	Cornwall	SW71231207	1961	1991		
ROC Post Thetford	Norfolk	TL86458540	1961	1991		
ROC Post Thirsk	Yorkshire	SE42098038	1962	1968		
ROC Post Thornbury	Gloucestershire	ST64688894	1962	1968		
ROC Post Thorne	Yorkshire	SE680155	1962	1968		
ROC Post Thornhill	Dumfriesshire	NX88409403	1968	1991		
ROC Post Thornton	Yorkshire	SE09133332	1958	1991		
ROC Post Threlkeld	Cumberland	NY30832439	1961	1991		
ROC Post Thurlaston	Leicestershire	SP49739990	1959	1968		
ROC Post Ticehurst	Sussex	TQ67622855	1959	1968	Unknown	1991
ROC Post Tighnabruaich	Argyllshire	NR96707127	1963	1989		
ROC Post Tintagel	Cornwall	SX05048843	1960	1968		
ROC Post Tirley	Gloucestershire	SO802279	1959	1968		
ROC Post Tisbury	Wiltshire	ST94062873	1960	1968		
ROC Post Tiverton	Devon	SS92881162	1960	1968		
ROC Post Tobermory, Isle of Mull	Argyllshire	NM524529	1964	1991		
ROC Post Tockwith	Yorkshire	SE45195223	1959	1991		
ROC Post Toddington	Bedfordshire	TL00922639	Unknown	1968		
ROC Post Todmorden	Yorkshire	SD93222739	1961	1968		
ROC Post Tollerton	Yorkshire	SE51676343	1959	1968		
ROC Post Tolleshunt d'Arcy	Essex	TL92261149	1959	1968		
ROC Post Tomatin	Inverness-shire	NH79822992	1963	1991		
ROC Post Tomintoul	Banffshire	NJ164182	Unknown	1991		
ROC Post Tongue	Sutherland	NC598563	1962	1991		
ROC Post Topcliffe	Yorkshire	SE41397560	1964	1968		
ROC Post Torquay	Devon	SX913643	1961	1991		
ROC Post Great Torrington	Devon	SS53062405	1960	1991		
ROC Post Tow Law Master Post	County Durham	NZ13423844	1958	1991		
ROC Post Tranent	East Lothian	NT41857265	1959	1968		
ROC Post Traquair	Peebles-shire	NT32703436	1962	1991		
ROC Post Trawsfynydd	Merionethshire	SH71193578	ca1960	1991		
ROC Post Trawsgoed Master Post	Cardiganshire	SN67937222	1959	1991		
ROC Post Trebetherick	Cornwall	SW94448008	1960	1968		
ROC Post Tregaron	Cardiganshire	SN67695981	1961	1991		
ROC Post Trefor	Caernarvonshire	SH37664655	1962	1968		
ROC Post Trumpet Master Post	Herefordshire	S068013720	1963	1991		
ROC Post Truro	Cornwall	SW82394367	1961	1968		
ROC Post Tulloch	Inverness-shire	NN37438120	1960	1991		
ROC Post Tunstall	Yorkshire	TA31183197	1959	1991		
ROC Post Turnberry Master Post	Ayrshire	NS21070586	1963	1991		
ROC Post Turnhouse	Mid Lothian	NT17747351	1958	1991		
ROC Post Turriff	Aberdeenshire	NJ73015044	1959	1991		
ROC Post Turton	Lancashire	SD72361433	1965	1991		
ROC Post Tweedsmuir	Peebles-shire	NT09302425	1959	1991		
ROC Post Twycross	Leicestershire	SK32850611	1960	1968		
ROC Post Tyn-y-Groes	Caernarvonshire	SH77367178	Unknown	1968		
ROC Post Tywyn	Merionethshire	SH59230421	1966	1991		
ROC Post Udny Station Master Post	Aberdeenshire	NJ91152443	1959	1991		
ROC Post Uig	Isle of Skye	NG40006345	1961	1991		
ROC Post Ullapool	Ross & Cromarty	NH124939	1960	1991		
ROC Post Upham	Hampshire	SU54182101	1959	1968		
ROC Post Upper Sapey	Worcestershire	SO70946250	1962	1991		
ROC Post Uppingham	Rutland	SP85039904	1960	1968		
ROC Post Upsall	Yorkshire	SE45358727	1961	1968		
ROC Post Upstreet	Kent	TR23356354	1961	1968		
ROC Post Upton	Yorkshire	SE45771474	1964	1991		
ROC Post Upton Magna	Shropshire	SJ54931253	1965	1991		
ROC Post Upton-on-Severn	Worcestershire	SO87383825	1961	1991		
ROC Post Upwell	Norfolk	TF50470220	1959	1991		
ROC Post Usk	Monmouthshire	ST41249907	1966	1968	1975	1991
ROC Post Uttoxeter Master Post	Derbyshire	SK11173604	1962	1991		
ROC Post Vange	Essex	TQ71748736	1958	1968		
ROC Post Verwood	Dorsetshire	SU09090973	1958	1968		
ROC Post Veryan	Cornwall	SW92033739	1963	1991		
ROC Post Voe	Shetland	HU44007268	1961	1991		
ROC Post Wadebridge	Cornwall	SX94827178	1961	1968		
ROC Post Walcott	Norfolk	TG37443175	1960	1968		
ROC Post Walkern	Hertfordshire	TL30212597	1958	1968		
ROC Post Wallington	Surrey	TQ28766213	1960	1991		
ROC Post Walls	Shetland	HU23734922	1961	1991		
ROC Post Walsall	Staffordshire	SJ98230010	1963	1968		
ROC Post Walton-on-the-Naze	Essex	TM25132127	1962	1968		
ROC Post Wansford	Northamptonshire	TL08199770	1962	1968		
ROC Post Wantage	Berkshire	SU40308714	1959	1991		
ROC Post Wareham	Dorsetshire	SY93008631	1959	1968		
ROC Post Warrington	Lancashire	SJ61929124	1959	1968		
ROC Post Wateringbury	Kent	TQ67625238	1959	1968		
ROC Post Watlington	Oxfordshire	SU71029357	1959	1991		
ROC Post Watten	Caithness	ND24775423	1959	1991		
ROC Post Watton	Norfolk	TF92810398	1959	1991		
ROC Post Wearhead	County Durham	NZ85443875	1961	1991		
ROC Post Week St. Mary	Cornwall	SX23419836	1960	1968		
ROC Post Weeton	Lancashire	SD37843558	1966	1968		
ROC Post Wellington	Somerset	ST15212338	1958	1991		
ROC Post Wells-next-the-Sea	Norfolk	TF91674209	1958	1968		
ROC Post Welshpool	Montgomeryshire	SJ22630871	1958	1991		
ROC Post Welwyn	Hertfordshire	TL20681117	1958	1991		
ROC Post West Beckham	Norfolk	TG14053880	1960	1991		
ROC Post West Calder	West Lothian	NT02956239	1959	1991		
ROC Post West Harptree	Somerset	ST54495611	1961	1991		
ROC Post West Hoathly	Sussex	TQ36333257	1962	1991		
ROC Post West Kilbride	Ayrshire	NS20654889	1961	1991		
ROC Post West Linton	Peebles-shire	NT13805253	1959	1991		
ROC Post West Lulworth	Dorsetshire	SY81907995	1959	1991		
ROC Post West Mersea	Essex	TM02211239	1960	1968		
ROC Post West Raynham	Norfolk	TF85592466	1959	1968		
ROC Post West Walton	Norfolk	TF47991415	1960	1968		
ROC Post West Wickham	Kent	TQ39656142(Probable)	1959	1968		
ROC Post Westbury-on-Severn	Gloucestershire	SO73051452	1963	1968		
ROC Post Westbury-sub-Mendip	Somerset	ST50015080	1961	1968		
ROC Post Westerton	County Durham	NZ24493122	1960	1991		
ROC Post Westleton	Suffolk	TM44486911	1958	1991		
ROC Post Weston Turville	Buckinghamshire	SP85221200	1959	1968		
ROC Post Weston-on-Trent	Staffordshire	SJ98132790	1960	1991		
ROC Post Westruther	Berwickshire	NT643496	1959	1968		
ROC Post Wetwang	Yorkshire	SE927589				
ROC Post Weybridge	Surrey	TQ08136602	1963	1991		
ROC Post Whitburn	County Durham	NZ40676264	1959	1968		
ROC Post Whitby	Yorkshire	NZ905113	1959	1968		
ROC Post Whitchurch, Buckinghamshire	Buckinghamshire	SP79432103	1957	1991		
ROC Post Whitchurch, Herefordshire	Herefordshire	S054231802	1961	1968		
ROC Post Whitchurch, Shropshire	Shropshire	SJ55534206	1960	1968		
ROC Post Whitehaven	Cumberland	NX98611888	1961	1991		
ROC Post Whitehead	Antrim	IJ45559192	1962	1968		
ROC Post Whitestone	Devon		1959	1968	Unknown	1991
ROC Post Whitfield	Northumberland	NY77915758	1960	1991		
ROC Post Whitley Bay	Northumberland	NZ35167127	1964	1991		
ROC Post Whitley Bridge	Yorkshire	SE559241	Unknown	1968		
ROC Post Whittingham	Northumberland	NU07431146	1962	1991		
ROC Post Whittlesey	Cambridgeshire	TL28509812	1958	1991		
ROC Post Whitwell	Derbyshire	SK52937695	1959	1991		
ROC Post Wick	Caithness	ND36525396	1959	1968		
ROC Post Wickersley	Yorkshire	SK47149149	Unknown	1991		
ROC Post Wickham Bishops	Essex	TL85521261	1959	1991		
ROC Post Wickham Market	Suffolk	TM30555503	1961	1991		
ROC Post Wickhambrook	Suffolk	TL75035412	1959	1991		
ROC Post Wiggenhall St Germans	Norfolk	TF57931279	1959	1968		
ROC Post Witchampton	Dorsetshire	SU00430565	1963	1991		
ROC Post Wigmore	Herefordshire	S042896949	1961	1968		
ROC Post Wigton	Cumberland	NY25114922	1962	1968	1973	1991
ROC Post Willingham	Cambridgeshire	TL41166505	1961	1991		
ROC Post Wilsthorpe	Yorkshire	TA16986419	Unknown	1968		
ROC Post Windermere	Westmorland	SD42659883 (Probable)	1963	1968		
ROC Post Windsor	Berkshire	SU972771	Unknown	1991		
ROC Post Winkleigh Master Post	Devon	SS62000943	1962	1991		
ROC Post Winscombe	Somerset	ST44605707 (Probable)	1960	1968		
ROC Post Winterton	Lincolnshire	SE93291894	1959	1991		
ROC Post Winterton Ness	Norfolk	TG49841955	1963	1968		
ROC Post Wiseton	Nottinghamshire	SK75589170	1964	1991		
ROC Post Witheridge	Devon	SS76731133	1959	1991		
ROC Post Wolston	Warwickshire	SP41947463	1960	1991		
ROC Post Wolviston	County Durham	NZ44682393	1960	1968		
ROC Post Woodham Ferrers (K1)	Essex	TQ79829883	1959	1991		
ROC Post Woodland	County Durham	NZ05012440	1960	1991		
ROC Post Woodvale	Lancashire	SD30480941	1968	1991		
ROC Post Woolacombe	Devon	SS48464262	1962	1968		
ROC Post Woolverstone	Suffolk	TM19493732	1961	1991		
ROC Wootton	Lincolnshire	TA07581518	1961	1991		
ROC Post Workington	Cumberland	NY01052961	1962	1991		
ROC Post Wormley	Surrey	SU94863465	1959	1968		
ROC Post Worth Matravers	Dorsetshire	SY98437837	1962	1991		
ROC Post Wroughton	Wiltshire	SU14117950	1968	1991		
ROC Post Wye	Kent	TR05474606	1959	1991		
ROC Post Wykeham	Yorkshire	SE96218439	1959	1991		
ROC Post Wylye	Wiltshire	SU00703690	1961	1991		
ROC Post Wymeswold	Leicestershire	SK61372351	1961	1968		
ROC Post Wymondham	Norfolk	TM12579878	1959	1991		
ROC Post Yarrow	Selkirkshire	NT30242476	1961	1991		
ROC Post Yetminster Master Post	Dorsetshire	ST59981025	1961	1991		
ROC Post Ynysddu	Monmouthshire	ST19709435	1963	1968	1969	1991

== See also ==
- Commandant Royal Observer Corps
- Aircraft recognition
- Royal Observer Corps Monitoring Post
- Operational instruments of the Royal Observer Corps
- AWDREY
- Bomb Power Indicator
- Ground Zero Indicator
- Fixed Survey Meter
- United Kingdom Warning and Monitoring Organisation
- Four-minute warning
- Royal Observer Corps Medal
- Skywatch march
- RAF Bentley Priory
- Aircraft Identity Corps (Canada)
- Volunteer Air Observers Corps (Australia)
- Ground Observer Corps (USA)
- Civil Air Patrol (USA)
- List of ROC Group Headquarters and UKWMO Sector controls
