= Skywatch march =

Skywatch is the official regimental march of the Royal Observer Corps.

The march was composed and scored in 1972 by Wing Commander Roy R C Davies RAF, at the time leader and conductor of the Central Band of the Royal Air Force. The tune is reminiscent of the march of the RAF and has been played on many formal occasions, including two Royal Garden Parties in the presence of Queen Elizabeth II at RAF Bentley Priory and at the Festival of Remembrance in the Royal Albert Hall.

In 1994 Davies donated the original score of Skywatch for inclusion in the book "Forewarned is Forearmed - a tribute to the Royal Observer Corps".

Skywatch continues to feature on musical collections released by the Central Band of the Royal Air Force.
