= Atomic Weapons Detection Recognition and Estimation of Yield =

Instrument to detect nuclear explosions

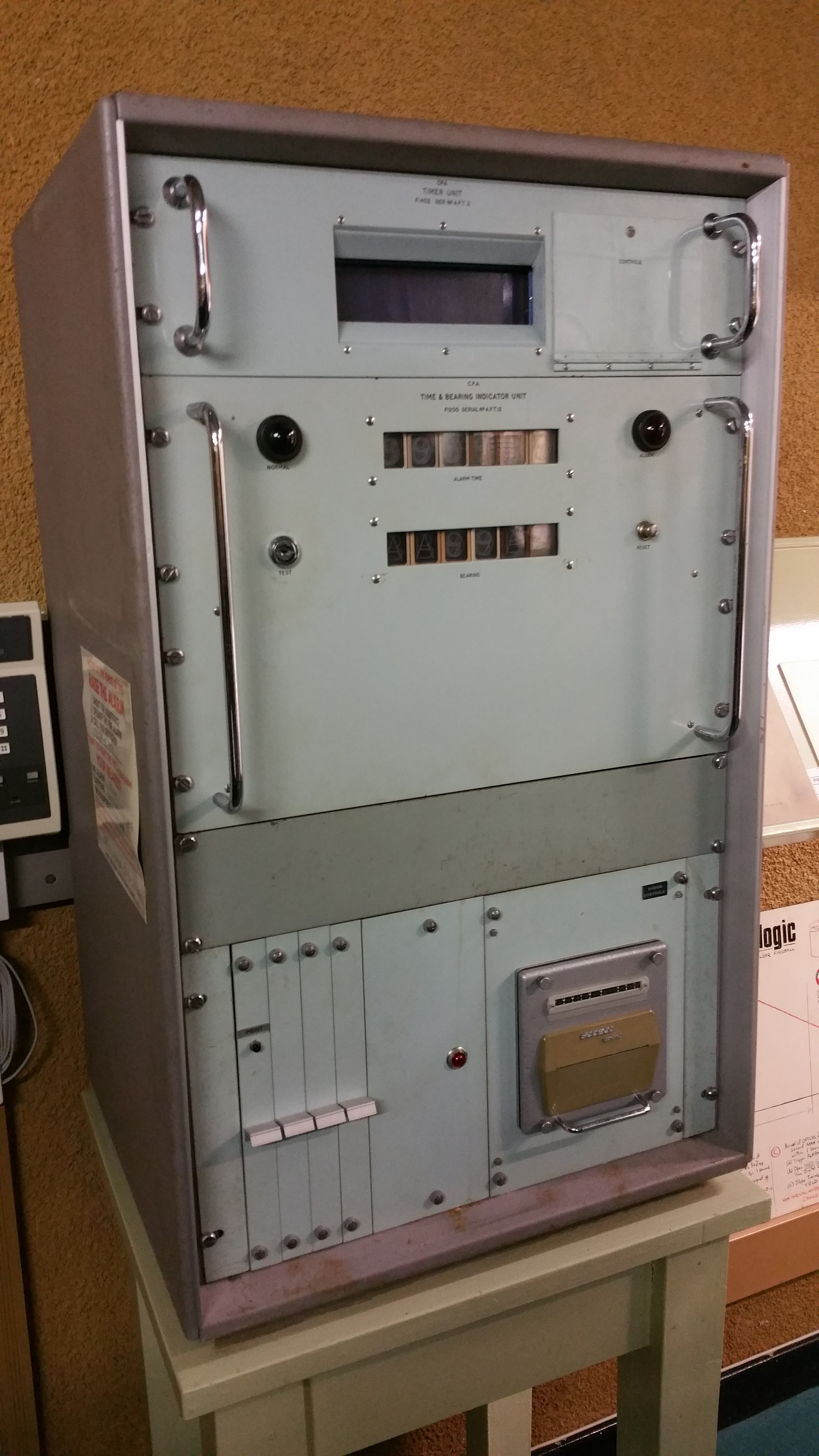
A photograph of an AWDREY display unit taken in situ at the York Cold War Bunker

Atomic Weapons Detection Recognition and Estimation of Yield known by the acronym AWDREY was a desk-mounted automatic detection instrument, located at 13 of the 25 Royal Observer Corps (ROC) controls, across the United Kingdom, during the Cold War. The instruments would have detected any nuclear explosions and indicated the estimated size in megatons.

With the display unit mounted in a 3-foot-high (0.91 m) steel cabinet, the system used two sets of five photo-sensitive cells within the detection head to record the intense flash of light produced by the detonation of the weapon followed, within a second, by a second intense flash. This double flash is characteristic of a nuclear explosion and measurement of the short gap between the two flashes enabled the weapon's power to be estimated, and the bearing to be indicated. It had a range of 150 miles (240 km) in good visibility. From 1974 AWDREY units were used together with a device known as DIADEM (Direction Indicator of Atomic Detonation by Electronic Means) which measured the electromagnetic pulse (EMP) generated by an explosion. The instruments were in constant operation (state of readiness) between 1968 and 1992 and tested daily by full-time ROC officers.

== Operations ==
AWDREY was designed, built and maintained by the Atomic Weapons Establishment at Aldermaston. The design was tested for performance and accuracy using real nuclear explosions at the 1957 Kiritimati (or Christmas Island) nuclear weapon trials, after being mounted on board a ship. Although a single AWDREY unit could not differentiate between a nuclear explosion and a lightning strike, the units were installed sufficiently far apart that a lightning strike would not simultaneously register on two adjacent AWDREYs.

The first two primary responsibilities of the United Kingdom Warning and Monitoring Organisation (UKWMO), for whom the ROC provided the field force were:

- Warning the public of any air attack (see four-minute warning)
- Providing confirmation of nuclear strike on the UK

AWDREY was the principal method by which the UKWMO would achieve its second responsibility. Simultaneous responses on two or more AWDREY units would identify the explosion as a nuclear strike.

ROC post bomb detection instruments (see Bomb Power Indicator) operated by recording the peak overpressure of the blast wave from any nearby nuclear explosion. Any ultra-high-altitude nuclear explosion, designed to knock out the UK's communications and electronic equipment would not produce a detectable blast wave, and the AWDREY system was therefore the only method of identifying these bursts.

== Installation ==
The AWDREY installation consisted of three separate elements: the sensor, the detection unit and the display cabinet (timer). The sensor was mounted on the roof of the building. The detection unit was installed in a special room that was enclosed inside a Faraday cage; in the case of the Royal Observer Corps controls, this was the "Radio Room" that already protected the sensitive radio equipment from the effects of EMP.

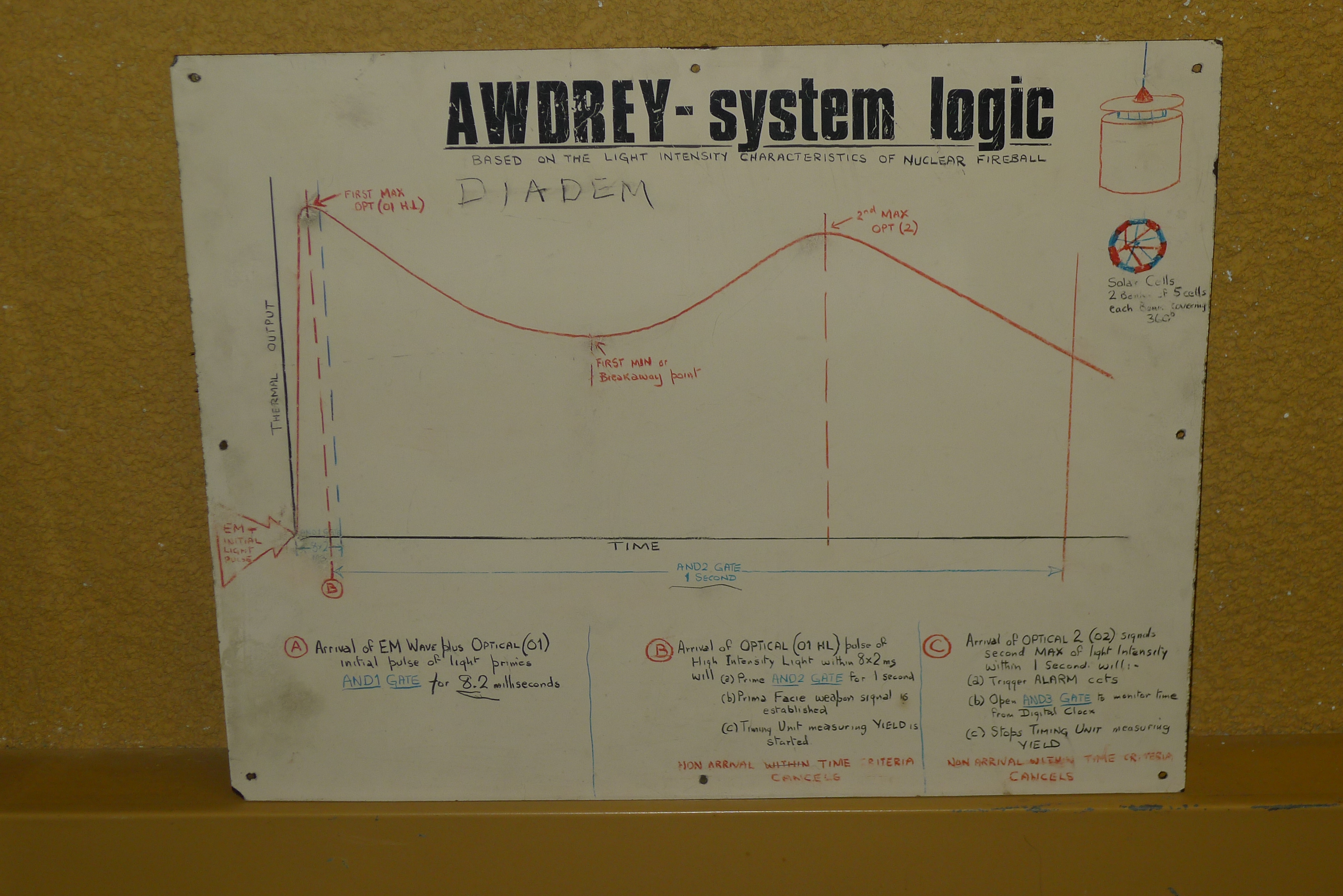
Awdrey Timing and Logic on display in York

The display unit (timer) (shown in the photograph above) could be mounted anywhere in the building – at ROC controls this was usually on the balcony adjacent to the Triangulation Team. The three elements of the installation were connected by EMP-shielded and heavy duty cabling.

During the early phase of operations, a spare observer was required to stand next to the display unit and monitor it constantly to identify initial responses. Once a nuclear strike on the UK had been confirmed by the Director UKWMO (or his deputy), readings from AWDREY were ignored during subsequent nuclear bursts within the attack, and the readings from ROC posts became the main method of detecting and identifying any subsequent near ground bursts.

The 13 ROC AWDREY units were located at the group controls in Exeter, Oxford, Horsham, Bristol, Colchester, Carmarthen, Coventry, Carlisle, York, Dundee, Oban, Inverness and Belfast. This siting pattern provided sufficient detectors that the entire UK was covered, but the units were far enough apart that a lightning storm would be unlikely to trigger simultaneous AWDREY responses at two sites.

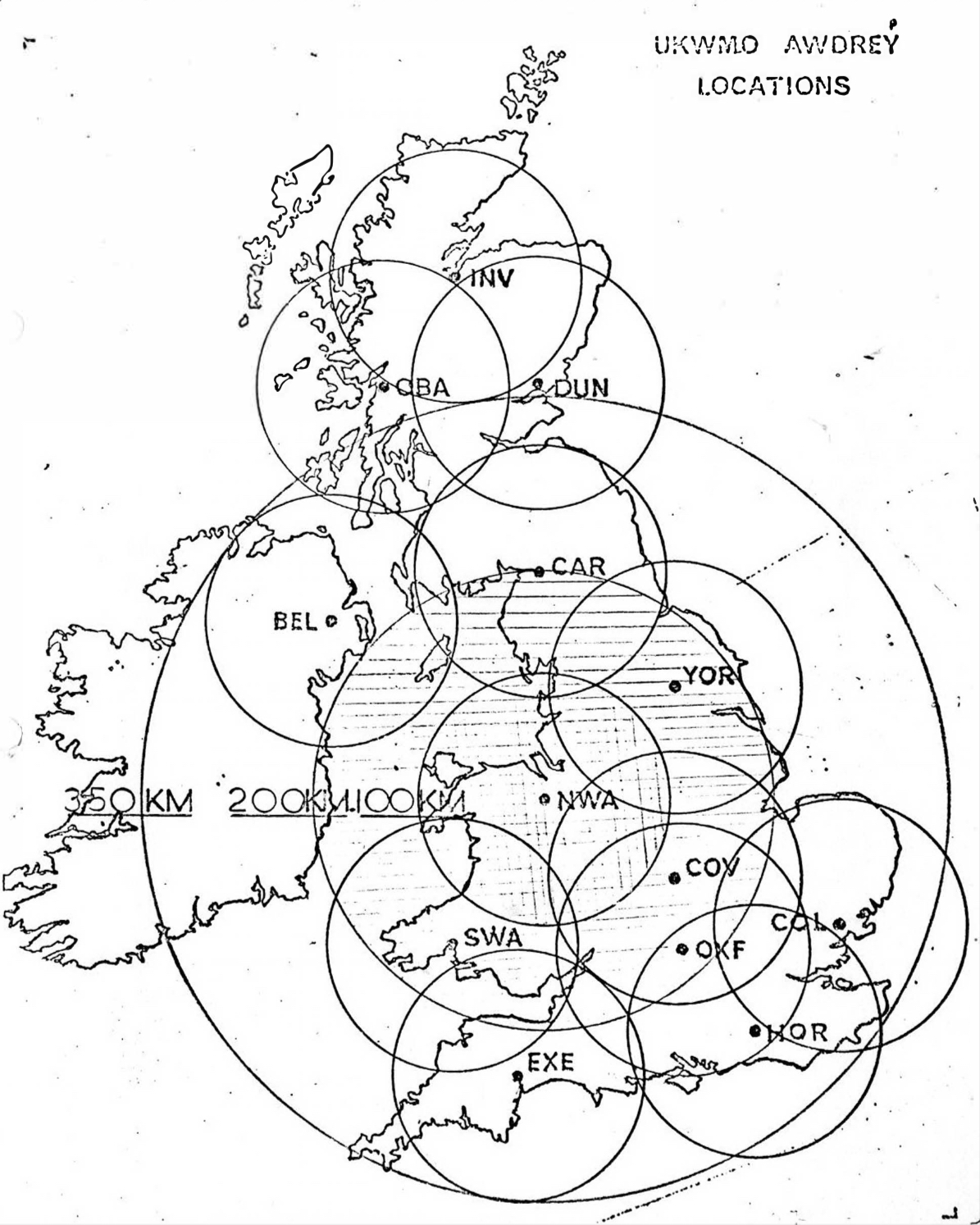
AWDREY Locations in the United Kingdom

== Codeword ==
Royal Observer Corps reports following a reading on AWDREY were prefixed with the codeword "TOCSIN BANG". The message would also include the three-letter group identifier, followed by the time and yield reading from the AWDREY printout. E.g. "TOCSIN BANG – CAR – 11.06 (hours) – 3 megatons" (with CAR relating to Carlisle control).

== See also ==
- Royal Observer Corps
- Operational instruments of the Royal Observer Corps
- United Kingdom Warning and Monitoring Organisation
- Nuclear MASINT - US equivalent
- York Cold War Bunker
