= National Register of Historic Places listings in Caribou County, Idaho =

Location of Caribou County in Idaho

This is a list of the National Register of Historic Places listings in Caribou County, Idaho.

This is intended to be a complete list of the properties and districts on the National Register of Historic Places in Caribou County, Idaho, United States. Latitude and longitude coordinates are provided for many National Register properties and districts; these locations may be seen together in a map.

There are 8 properties and districts listed on the National Register in the county. More may be added; properties and districts nationwide are added to the Register weekly.

This National Park Service list is complete through NPS recent listings posted May 1, 2026.

== Current listings ==
	Name on the Register	Image	Date listed	Location	City or town	Description
1	Caribou County Courthouse	Caribou County Courthouse	September 22, 1987 (#87001582)	159 S. Main; 42°39′21″N 111°36′08″W	Soda Springs	
2	Chesterfield Historic District	Chesterfield Historic District	December 4, 1980 (#80001297)	Town of Chesterfield; 42°52′01″N 111°54′22″W	Chesterfield	
3	Enders Hotel	Enders Hotel	May 14, 1993 (#93000384)	76 S. Main St. 42°39′27″N 111°36′12″W	Soda Springs	
4	Grace Pegram Truss Railroad Bridge	Grace Pegram Truss Railroad Bridge	July 25, 1997 (#97000758)	Over the Bear River 0.5 miles (0.80 km) north-northwest of the junction of State Highway 34 and Turner Rd. 42°35′06″N 111°44′05″W	Grace vicinity	
5	William Hopkins House	William Hopkins House	January 8, 1979 (#79000787)	351 E. Hooper Ave. 42°39′33″N 111°35′33″W	Soda Springs	
6	Lander Road		April 24, 1975 (#75000627)	Northeast of Soda Springs in the Caribou National Forest, south of State Highway 34; 42°52′55″N 111°11′07″W	Soda Springs	
7	Edgar Walter Largilliere Sr. House	Edgar Walter Largilliere Sr. House	December 23, 1991 (#91001870)	30 W. 2nd, S. St. 42°39′18″N 111°36′13″W	Soda Springs	
8	Soda Springs City Hall	Soda Springs City Hall	May 14, 1993 (#93000385)	109 S. Main St. 42°39′24″N 111°36′08″W	Soda Springs	

== See also ==
- List of National Historic Landmarks in Idaho
- National Register of Historic Places listings in Idaho
