= Aircraft Identity Corps =

- Active: 1940–1945
- Country: Canada
- Branch: Royal Canadian Air Force
- Type: Civil defence organisation.
- Role: Aircraft recognition and reporting (1940–1943)
- Size: 1945 - circa 30,000 personnel
- Engagements: World War II

The Aircraft Identity Corps was a Canadian civil defence organization operating between 1940 and 1945. The corps' mission was to report suspicious aircraft and guard against German, Japanese, and Italian attack. The use of observers was deemed important because radar was not yet in widespread use. It was rebuilt as the Long Range Air Raid Warning System in 1950.

The Aircraft Identity Corps was formed in 1940 by Air Vice Marshal George Croil for service during World War II. By the war's end in 1945 it had over 30,000 members.

Among the corps' responsibilities was a system of 266 observation posts extending from the Sault Ste. Marie locks in northern Michigan to Hudson Bay, to protect the strategically important locks against a possible long-range German air attack. The joint US and Canadian defence of these locks was coordinated by the US Army's Central Defense Command.

In the then-separate Dominion of Newfoundland, there was an Aircraft Detection Corps Newfoundland. At the behest of the Royal Canadian Air Force (RCAF), the Commissioner of Defence for Newfoundland, L. E. Emerson, amalgamated the Aircraft Detection Corps Newfoundland with the Canadian Aircraft Detection Corps. On March 15, 1942, Emerson circulated a communiqué stating the "Aircraft Detection Corps Newfoundland" would be organized by the RCAF as a unit of the Canadian Aircraft Identity Corps. One of the letter's recipients was Newfoundland public figure P. W. Crummey, an Aircraft Detection Corps Newfoundland volunteer. Attached to the communique was a letter from Flight Lieutenant H. H. Graham, commanding officer of Torbay Airport, No. 1 Group RCAF, St. John's; glossaries of airplanes and ships; an identity card; and procedural instructions.

At war's end, Aircraft Identity Corps volunteers in Canada and the Dominion of Newfoundland received a brass Volunteer Aircraft Observer button and certificate of thanks from Canada's Department of National Defence. Some Aircraft Detection Corps Newfoundland volunteers qualified for the United Kingdom's Defence Medal.

== See also ==
- Aircraft recognition
- Ground Observer Corps (United States)
- Volunteer Air Observers Corps (Australia)
- Royal Observer Corps (United Kingdom)
