= NORAD =

Bi-national military alliance

North American Aerospace Defense Command
- Commandement de la défense aérospatiale de l'Amérique du Nord
- Crest of North American Aerospace Defense Command
- Founded: 12 September 1957 (69 years, 1 month)
- Countries: Canada; United States
- Type: Bi-national command
- Role: Conducting aerospace warning, aerospace control and maritime warning in the defense of North America.
- Headquarters: Peterson Space Force Base, Colorado Springs, Colorado, U.S.
- Motto: We Have the Watch
- Emblem Colors: Blue; turquoise; yellow
- Website: norad.mil

Commanders
- Commander: Gen Gregory Guillot, USAF
- Deputy Commander: LGen Iain S. Huddleston, RCAF
- Vice Commander, U.S. Element: LTG Joseph Jarrard, USA
- Command Senior Enlisted Leader: CMSgt John G. Storms, USAF

The North American Aerospace Defense Command (commonly abbreviated to NORAD /ˈnɔːræd/ NΟR-ad; French: Commandement de la défense aérospatiale de l'Amérique du Nord; CDAAN) is a bi-national mutual defense organization in Canada and the United States. Established 12 September 1957 as the North American Air Defense Command, NORAD is headquartered at Peterson Space Force Base in Colorado, which also serves as the headquarters of United States Northern Command (USNORTHCOM).

During World War II, Canada contacted the United States for protection from German aggression. Later, during the beginning of the Cold War, the U.S. and Canada formed a permanent military alliance.

NORAD has three regions: the Alaskan region, the Canadian region, and the American Continental region. The administrative offices are located in New Mexico and Arizona. NORAD has an alternate command center called Cheyenne Mountain Complex in Colorado. NORAD has a total of 1,000 soldiers, personnel and military dependents.

== Structure ==
=== Divisions ===
NORAD has administratively divided the North American landmass into The North American Aerospace Defence Command, Alaskan Region (ANR), Canadian Region (CANR), and the continental United States (CONR–AFNORTH).

The structure includes:

- The 1st Canadian Air Division (French: 1re Division aérienne du Canada), in the Canadian Region.
- The Eleventh Air Force (11 AF), in the Alaskan Region.
- The First Air Force (1 AF), in the American Continental Region.

=== Command structure ===
The North American Aerospace Command maintains a headquarters located at Peterson Space Force Base near Colorado Springs, Colorado. The NORAD and USNORTHCOM Command Center at Peterson serves as both a central collection and coordination facility for a worldwide system of sensors designed to provide the commander and the leadership of Canada and the U.S. with an accurate picture of any active aerospace or maritime threat.

Command structure by order of authority:

- Commanding officer
- Executive officer
- Chief of staff
- Commander senior enlisted leader

== Regions ==
Map showing the location of NORAD headquarters
Main Headquarters, Regional Headquarters, Sector Headquarters

=== Alaska, United States ===
The Alaskan NORAD Region (ANR) maintains continuous capability to detect, validate and warn off any atmospheric threat in its area of operations from its Regional Operations Control Center (ROCC) at Joint Base Elmendorf–Richardson, Alaska.

ANR maintains the readiness to conduct a continuum of aerospace control missions, which include daily air sovereignty in peacetime, contingency and deterrence in time of tension, and active air defense against crewed and uncrewed air-breathing atmospheric vehicles in times of crisis.

ANR is supported by both active duty and reserve units. Active duty forces are provided by 11 AF and the Canadian Armed Forces (CAF), and reserve forces provided by the Alaska Air National Guard. Both 11 AF and the CAF provide active duty personnel to the ROCC to maintain continuous surveillance of Alaskan airspace.

=== Canada ===
Canadian NORAD Region Headquarters is at CFB Winnipeg, Manitoba. It was established on 22 April 1983 at CFB North Bay in Ontario. It is responsible for providing surveillance and control of Canadian airspace. The Royal Canadian Air Force provides alert assets to NORAD. In 1996, CANR was renamed 1 Canadian Air Division and moved to CFB Winnipeg.

Canadian air defense forces assigned to NORAD include 409 Tactical Fighter Squadron at CFB Cold Lake, Alberta and 425 Tactical Fighter Squadron at CFB Bagotville, Quebec. All squadrons fly the McDonnell Douglas CF-18 Hornet fighter aircraft.

To monitor for drug trafficking, the Canadian NORAD Region monitors all air traffic approaching the coast of Canada, in cooperation with the Royal Canadian Mounted Police and the United States drug law enforcement agencies. Any aircraft that has not filed a flight plan may be directed to land and be inspected by RCMP and Canada Border Services Agency.

In June 2026, Canada signed agreements with Australia to acquire long-range over-the-horizon radar technology for its Arctic Over-the-Horizon Radar (A-OTHR) program, aimed at improving threat detection in the Arctic and supporting NORAD modernization. The agreements, signed in Canberra by Canadian and Australian officials, formalized the partnership and moved the project from planning into the delivery phase.

=== Continental U.S. ===
The Continental NORAD Region (CONR) is the component of NORAD that provides airspace surveillance and control and directs air sovereignty activities for the Contiguous United States (CONUS). Since the terrorist attacks of September 11, 2001, CONR has been the lead agency for Operation Noble Eagle, an ongoing mission to protect the continental United States from airborne attacks.

CONR is the NORAD designation of the United States Air Force First Air Force/AFNORTH. Its headquarters is located at Tyndall Air Force Base, Florida. The First Air Force (1 AF) became responsible for the USAF air defense mission in September 1990. AFNORTH is the United States Air Force component of United States Northern Command (NORTHCOM).

1 AF/CONR-AFNORTH comprises Air National Guard Fighter Wings assigned an air defense mission to 1 AF/CONR-AFNORTH on federal orders, made up primarily of citizen Airmen. The primary weapons systems are the McDonnell Douglas F-15 Eagle and General Dynamics F-16 Fighting Falcon aircraft.

It plans, conducts, controls, coordinates and ensures air sovereignty and provides for the unilateral defense of the United States. A combined First Air Force command post is at Tyndall Air Force Base. The US East ROCC (Eastern Air Defense Sector), Sector Operations Control Center (SOCC) is at Rome, New York. The US West ROCC (Western Air Defense Sector) control center is at McChord Field, Washington. Both maintain continuous surveillance of CONUS airspace.

In its role as the CONUS NORAD Region, 1 AF/CONR-AFNORTH also performs counter-drug surveillance operations.

== History ==
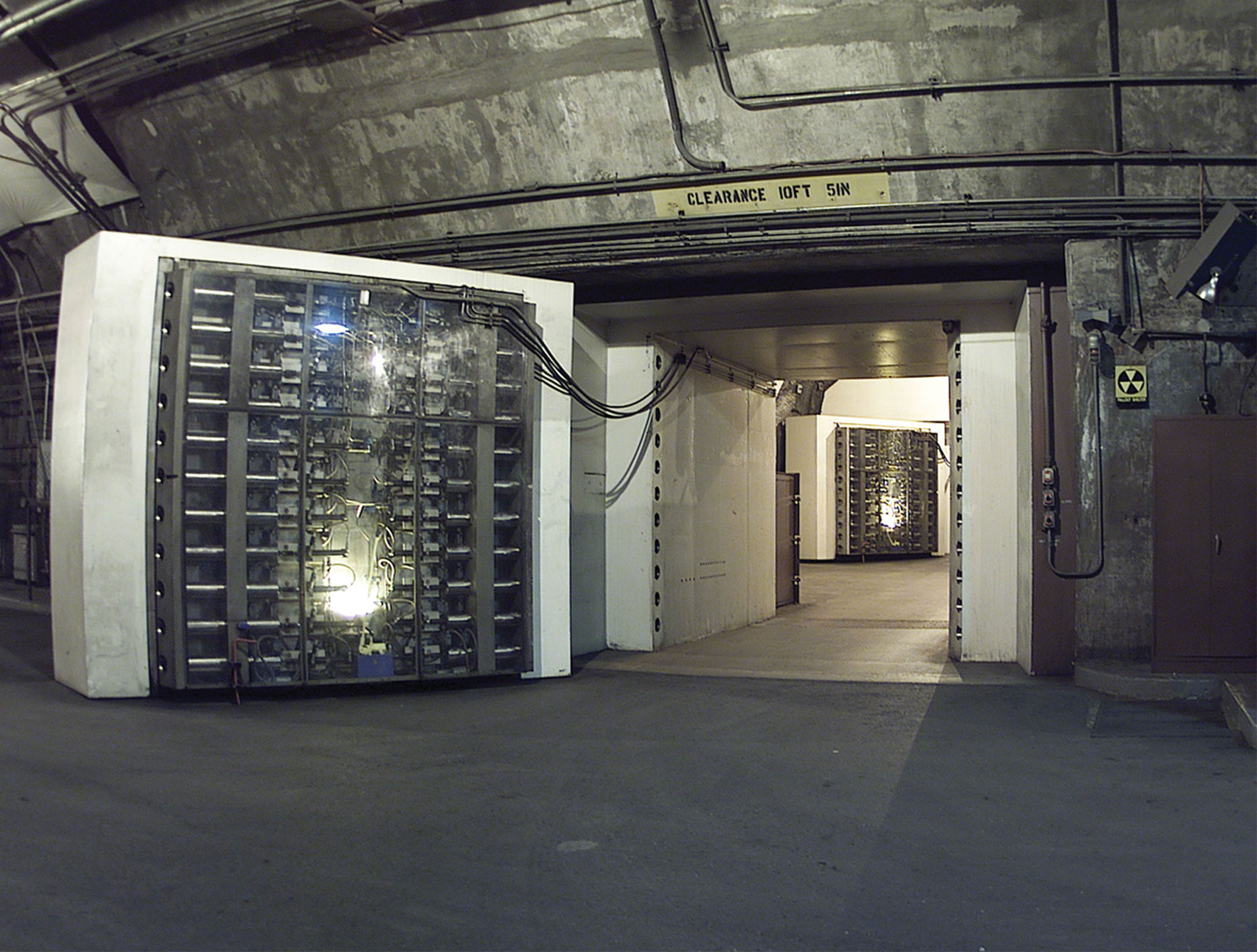
The 25-ton North blast door in the Cheyenne Mountain nuclear bunker is the main entrance to another blast door in the background, beyond which the side tunnel branches into access tunnels to the main chambers.

The North American Air Defense Command was recommended by the Joint Canadian–U.S. Military Group in late 1956, approved by the U.S. Joint Chiefs of Staff in February 1957, and announced in August 1957. NORAD's command headquarters was established on 12 September 1957 at Ent Air Force Base's 1954 blockhouse. In 1958, Canada and the United States agreed that the NORAD commander would always be a United States officer, with a Canadian vice commander. Canada "agreed the command's primary purpose would be ... early warning and defense for the Strategic Air Command's (SAC)'s retaliatory forces".

In late 1958, Canada and the United States started the Continental Air Defense Integration North (CADIN) for the Semi-Automatic Ground Environment air defense network. The initial CADIN cost-sharing agreement between the two countries was signed in January 1959. Two December 1958 plans submitted by NORAD had "average yearly expenditure of around five and one half billions", including "cost of the accelerated Nike Zeus program" and three Ballistic Missile Early Warning System (BMEWS) sites.

Canada's NORAD bunker at CFB North Bay with a SAGE AN/FSQ-7 Combat Direction Central computer was constructed from 1959 to 1963. Each of the USAF's eight smaller AN/FSQ-8 Combat Control Central systems provided NORAD with data and could command the entire United States air defense. The RCAF's 1950 "ground observer system, the Long Range Air Raid Warning System", was discontinued. In January 1959, the United States Ground Observer Corps was deactivated.

The Cheyenne Mountain nuclear bunker's planned mission was expanded in August 1960 to "a hardened center from which CINCNORAD would supervise and direct operations against space attack as well as air attack". In October 1960, the Secretary of Defense assigned, "operational command of all space surveillance to Continental Air Defense Command (CONAD) and operational control to North American Air Defense Command (NORAD)".

In December 1960, the Joint Chiefs of Staff (JCS) placed the Ent Air Force Base Space Detection and Tracking System (496L System with Philco 2000 Model 212 computer) "under the operational control of CINCNORAD ", during the Cheyenne Mountain nuclear bunker excavation, and the joint SAC-NORAD exercise "Sky Shield II". In September 1962—"Sky Shield III" were conducted for mock penetration of NORAD sectors.

In 1963, NORAD command center operations moved from Ent Air Force Base to the partially underground "Combined Operations Center" for Aerospace Defense Command and NORAD at the Chidlaw Building. President John F. Kennedy visited "NORAD headquarters" after the 5 June 1963 United States Air Force Academy graduation. On 30 October 1964, "NORAD began manning" the Combat Operations Center in the Cheyenne Mountain Complex.

In 1965, about 250,000 United States and Canadian personnel were involved in the operation of NORAD. On 1 January 1966, Air Force Systems Command turned the COC over to NORAD. The NORAD Cheyenne Mountain Complex was accepted on 8 February 1966.

=== 1968 reorganization ===
United States Department of Defense (Note: The current administration styles the Department as the "Department of War.".) realignments for the NORAD command organization began on 15 November 1968 (e.g., Army Air Defense Command (ARADCOM)). By 1972, there were eight NORAD "regional areas ... for all air defense". The NORAD Cheyenne Mountain Complex Improvements Program (427M System) became operational in 1979.

=== False alarms ===
On at least three occasions, NORAD systems failed, such as on 9 November 1979, when a technician in NORAD loaded a test tape, but failed to switch the system status to "test", causing a stream of constant false warnings to spread to two "continuity of government" bunkers as well as command posts worldwide. On 3 June 1980, and again on 6 June 1980, a computer communications device failure caused warning messages to sporadically flash in U.S. Air Force command posts around the world that a nuclear attack was taking place.

During these incidents, Pacific Air Forces (PACAF) properly had their planes loaded with nuclear bombs in the air. Strategic Air Command (SAC) did not and received criticism, because they did not follow procedure, even though the SAC command knew these were almost certainly false alarms, as did PACAF. Both command posts had recently begun receiving and processing direct reports from the various radar, satellite, and other missile attack detection systems, and those direct reports simply did not match the erroneous data received from NORAD.

=== 1980 reorganization ===
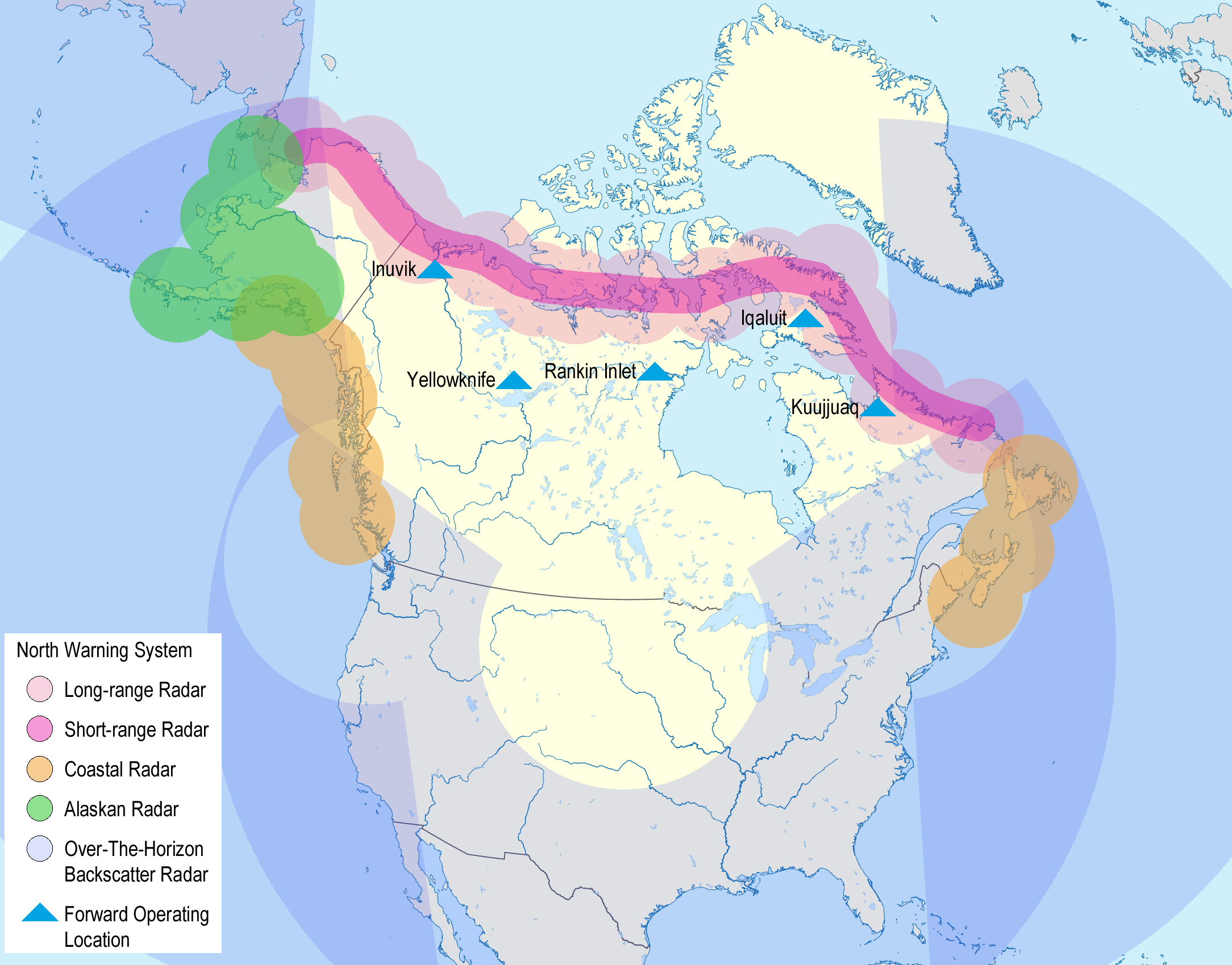
The North Warning System as envisioned by Canada and the US in 1987

Following the 1979 Joint US-Canada Air Defense Study, the command structure for aerospace defense was changed, e.g., "SAC assumed control of ballistic missile warning and space surveillance facilities" on 1 December 1979 from ADCOM. The Aerospace Defense Command major command ended 31 March 1980. Its organizations in Cheyenne Mountain became the "ADCOM" specified command under the same commander as NORAD, e.g., HQ NORAD/ADCOM J31 staffed the Space Surveillance Center.

In 1982, a NORAD Off-site Test Facility called the Test and Development Facility (TDF) was located at Peterson AFB. The DEW Line was to be replaced with the North Warning System (NWS), the Over-the-Horizon Backscatter (OTH-B) radar was to be deployed, more advanced fighters were deployed, and E-3 Sentry AWACS aircraft were planned for greater use. These recommendations were accepted by the governments in 1985. The United States Space Command was formed in September 1985 as an adjunct, but not a component of NORAD.

NORAD was renamed North American Aerospace Defense Command in March 1981.

=== Post–Cold War ===
In 1989, NORAD operations expanded to cover counter-drug operations, for example, tracking of small aircraft entering and operating within the United States and Canada. DEW line sites were replaced between 1986 and 1995 by the North Warning System. The Cheyenne Mountain site was upgraded.

After the September 11 2001 attacks, the NORAD Air Warning Center's mission included the interior airspace of North America.

The Cheyenne Mountain Realignment was announced in July 2006, to consolidate NORAD's day-to-day operations at Peterson Air Force Base. In January 2026, U.S. Ambassador to Canada Pete Hoekstra warned that PM Mark Carney’s decision to scale back or cancel Canada's planned purchase of 88 F-35 fighter jets would require changes to the NORAD agreement, with the United States likely sending its aircraft into Canadian airspace if the detail didn't go through.

Former NORAD Regions/Sectors
	1966	1967	1968	1969	1970–1983	1984	1985–1986	1987	1988–1990	1991–1992	1993–1995	1996–2005	2006–2009
20th Air Division	1966–1967			1969–1983									
21st Air Division	1966–1967			1969–1983									
22nd Air Division	1966–1987												
23rd Air Division				1969–1987									
24th Air Division				1969–1990									
25th Air Division	1966–1990												
26th Air Division	1966–1990												
27th Air Division	1966–1969												
28th Air Division	1966–1969						1985–1992						
29th Air Division	1966–1969												
30th Air Division	1966–1968												
31st Air Division	1966–1969												
32nd Air Division	1966–1969												
34th Air Division	1966–1969												
35th Air Division	1966–1969												
36th Air Division	1966–1969												
Western Air Defense Sector (WADS)								1987–1995					
Eastern Air Defense Sector (EADS)								1987–2009					
Southeast Air Defense Sector (SEADS)								1987–2005					
Southwest Air Defense Sector (SWADS)								1987–1995					

== In popular culture ==
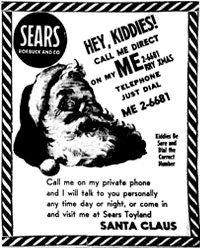
A 1955 Sears ad with the misprinted telephone number that led to the NORAD Tracks Santa Program. NORAD Tracks Santa follows Santa Claus' Christmas Eve journey around the world. The service has expanded to various internet platforms and can be accessed seasonally by phone at: 1-877-HI-NORAD (multilingual)

=== In film and television ===
The NORAD command center located under Cheyenne Mountain, Colorado is a setting of the 1983 film WarGames and the television series Jeremiah and Stargate SG-1. In the 2014 film Interstellar, NORAD dissolves and its headquarters is converted for use by NASA. The 1970 film Colossus: The Forbin Project is largely based on NORAD.

In the South Park episode "Back to the Cold War", Mr. Mackey hacks into NORAD using late-1980s computer hardware.

=== Santa tracker ===
As a publicity move on 24 December 1955, NORAD's predecessor, the Continental Air Defense Command (CONAD), informed the press that CONAD was tracking Santa Claus's sleigh, adding that "CONAD, Army, Navy and Marine Air Forces will continue to track and guard Santa and his sleigh on his trip to and from the U.S. against possible attack from those who do not believe in Christmas". A Christmas Eve tradition was born, known as the "NORAD Tracks Santa" program. Every year on Christmas Eve, "NORAD Tracks Santa" purports to track Santa Claus as he leaves the North Pole and delivers presents to children around the world. Today, NORAD relies on volunteers to make the program possible.

== See also ==
- 154th Wing
- Air Forces Northern National Security Emergency Preparedness Directorate
- Commander of the North American Aerospace Defense Command
- Joint Surveillance System, (of USAF & FAA), replaces SAGE
- Main Centre for Missile Attack Warning, a Soviet/Russian equivalent.
