= Aircraft Detection Corps Newfoundland =

- The Defense Medal awarded for service in the Aircraft Detection Corps (Newfoundland).
- Active: 1940–1943
- Country: Newfoundland
- Type: Civil defence organisation.
- Role: Aircraft recognition and reporting (1940–1943)
- Engagements: World War II

The Aircraft Detection Corps Newfoundland was created by the Commission of Government of the Dominion of Newfoundland.

Aircraft Detection Corps Newfoundland was an all-volunteer civilian unit meant to observe for suspicious planes and ships. Some participants have qualified for the Defence Medal.

The Commissioner of Defence for Newfoundland was L. E. Emerson. In 1942 he amalgamated the Newfoundland Aircraft Detection Corps with the Canadian Aircraft Identity Corps.

In the spring of 1942, the Aircraft Detection Corps volunteers received manila envelopes with a letter from L. E. Emerson, Commissioner of Defence for Newfoundland stating that "Aircraft Identity Corps Newfoundland" would be reorganized as an instrument of the Royal Canadian Air Force. In the same package was a letter from Flight Lieutenant H. H. Graham, who was the commanding officer of Torbay Airport (No. 1 Group R.C.A.F. St. John's). The envelope had glossaries of airplanes and ships; an Aircraft Identity Corps identity card and instructions. At war's end, the volunteers also received a brass Volunteer Aircraft Observers button for his lapel pin and certificate of thanks from Canada's Department of National Defence.

== See also ==
- Aircraft recognition
- Ground Observer Corps (USA)
- Volunteer Air Observers Corps (Australia)
- Royal Observer Corps (UK)
