= Russell Brockbank =

- Born: 15 April 1913; Niagara Falls
- Died: 14 May 1979 (aged 66); Mendip Hospital
- Occupation: Cartoonist

Russell Partridge Brockbank (1913–1979) was a cartoonist, best known for his motoring, motor racing and aviation cartoons.

He was born in the Municipal Hospital, Niagara Falls, Ontario on 15 April 1913 to Caroline (née Partridge) and Clarence Brockbank. The family moved to England in 1929.

Brockbank studied at Chelsea Art School. His work was published in numerous magazines and journals, including Lilliput, Motor and Punch.

During World War II undertook convoy duties in the Royal Navy Volunteer Reserve, with the rank of lieutenant. His cartoon technique was used to more serious effect to help with wartime aircraft recognition, being published in the British training journal Aircraft Recognition.

His association with Punch lasted over 30 years, and he was art editor from 1949 to 1960.

Brockbank's cartoons were characterised by a high degree of draughtsmanship and he often went to great lengths to ensure that the cars and aircraft in his cartoons were as true-to-life as possible.

He died in the Mendip Hospital, Wells, on 14 May 1979 from bronchopneumonia and emphysema. The Russell Brockbank Partnership was set up by his family to commemorate his life and works.

== Books ==
- Round the Bend (1948?)
- Up the Straight (1955)
- Over the Line (1955)
- Bees Under my Bonnet (with Ronald Collier) (1955)
- Motoring Abroad (with Rodney Walkerley)
- More Motoring Abroad (with Rodney Walkerley)
- The Brockbank Omnibus (1957)
- Manifold Pressures (1958)
- Move Over! (1962)
- Motoring Through Punch (1970)
- Brockbank's Grand Prix (1973)
- The Best of Brockbank (1975)
