= Michael Cummings =

British cartoonist (1919–1997)

- Born: 1 June 1919
- Died: 9 October 1997 (aged 78)
- Education: Hall in Hampstead, Gresham's School in Norfolk, and the Chelsea School of Art in London
- Father: A. J. Cummings

Arthur Stuart Michael Cummings OBE (born Leeds, Yorkshire, 1 June 1919, died London, 9 October 1997) was a British newspaper cartoonist. He was known as Michael Cummings and signed his work simply Cummings.

== Early life ==
Cummings's mother was an artist, while his father, A. J. Cummings, was political editor of the Liberal News Chronicle daily newspaper of London. He was educated at The Hall, Hampstead, London, Gresham's School, in Norfolk, then at the Chelsea School of Art, London.

During the Second World War, he worked for the Air Ministry and became a major contributor to the training journal Aircraft Recognition.

== Work ==
Cummings was initially a supporter of the Labour Party and contributed illustrations for the pro-Labour magazine Tribune. He later joined the Daily Express; he would subsequently draw most of his work for that newspaper and The Sunday Express. His move to these publications also coincided with Cummings's moving to the political right. In a discussion of Cummings's political views, Robert Allen and John Frost described him as a Conservative. They added that Cummings "obviously reveres Mrs Thatcher, intensely dislikes Tony Benn (and takes credit for being the first cartoonist to note his wild stare), has no time at all for Ted Heath, and so on". Cummings saw himself as "a rude little boy speaking out at the awkward moment", but to many of his critics he was a reactionary. Common targets of Cumming's pen were the Labour Party, left-leaning town councils, trade unions, student activists, and immigration. Cummings was also opposed to communism, and his cartoons frequently satirized both the Soviet Union and Maoist China.

== Controversy ==
In 1965, Cummings drew a cartoon depicting Lyndon B. Johnson being entangled in a thorn tree with the head of a black man, while a British politician wearing blinkers watered a plant with the head of a black child. The tree carried three labels on its branches marked "Little Rock", "Malcolm X" and "Harlem Riots". The cartoon was an expression of Cummings's opposition to allowing black people to immigrate to Britain, believing such immigration would cause US-style race riots. This cartoon drew complaints from a group of Oxford students. They made an unsuccessful complaint to the British Press Council, stating that the cartoon distorted "historical, political and social realities to express a view which is not merely the lowest taste, but is a direct and calculated insult to coloured peoples both in Britain and America".

During The Troubles in Northern Ireland, Cummings repeatedly caricatured Irish people as diminutive, stupid, and murderous. In October 1971, Cummings drew a cartoon titled "Father O'Brezhnev, Missionary to Ulster", which depicted Leonid Brezhnev as a Roman Catholic Priest who was supplying weapons to the IRA. On 17 October 1971, National Union of Journalists members on the Scottish Daily Express objected strongly to Cummings's cartoon. The NUJ members described it as anti-Catholic, and expressed fears it would worsen sectarianism in Glasgow. The NUJ members stopped the presses in protest, and over 350,000 copies of the Daily Express were lost. The International Press Institute later criticized the NUJ's action, stating that their refusal to print the Cummings cartoon was "a serious threat to freedom of expression, all the more deplorable because the threat comes from journalists." On 29 May 1982, The Irish Times published an interview with Cummings, during which the reporter took issue with his depiction of the Irish. Cummings responded that he had a "cartoonist's licence" to depict the Irish as "extremely violent, bloody-minded, always fighting, drinking enormous amounts, getting roaring drunk". Cummings also added that the Provisional IRA's violent acts did tend to "make them look rather like apes, though that's rather hard luck on the apes". This caused several writers to accuse Cummings of promoting anti-Irish prejudices.

== Reception ==
Cummings's work was praised by Gerald Nabarro. In his autobiography, NAB 1: Portrait of a Politician, Nabarro described Cummings as a "great artist" who "adds vivacity and insight to every political situation he depicts." Amongst his fellow cartoonists, "Vicky" in particular hated Cummings, claiming – according to the journalist James Cameron – that "he was the only man entitled to draw with a Post Office nib": "He also despised his political attitudes and said he was a time-server."

== Honours ==
- 1983 – Officer of the Order of the British Empire
