= Enders Hotel =

- U.S. National Register of Historic Places
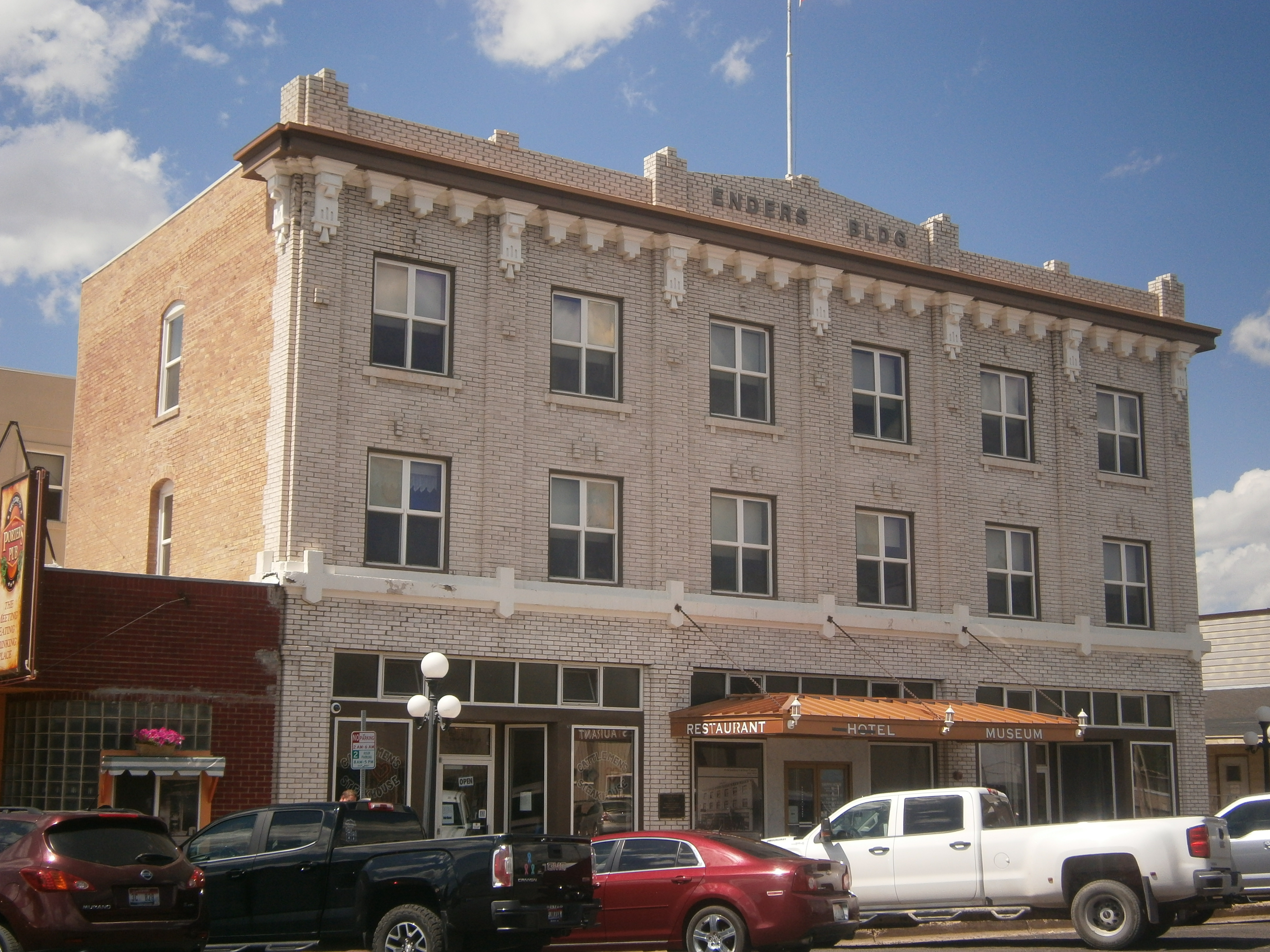

- Location within Idaho Location within the United States
- Location: 76 S. Main St., Soda Springs, Idaho
- Coordinates: 42°39′27″N 111°36′12″W
- Area: 0.4 acres (0.16 ha)
- Built: 1917
- Built by: C.K. Blocker
- Architect: Herman Falkenberg
- Architectural style: Early Commercial
- NRHP reference No.: 93000384
- Added to NRHP: May 14, 1993

The Enders Hotel is a historic hotel at 76 S. Main St. in Soda Springs in Caribou County, Idaho. It was built in Early Commercial style in 1917. It was listed on the National Register of Historic Places in 1993.

It has the only facade from before 1950 on the Main Street. It is a three-story building with a rectangular first floor but C-shaped upper floors which provide windows for all hotel rooms. As of Summer 2021, the hotel is closed and the number is disconnected. Summer of 2022 the Enders Museum is open to the public Memorial day weekend to Labor day weekend.
