= Edgar Walter Largilliere Sr. House =

Historic house in Idaho, United States

- U.S. National Register of Historic Places
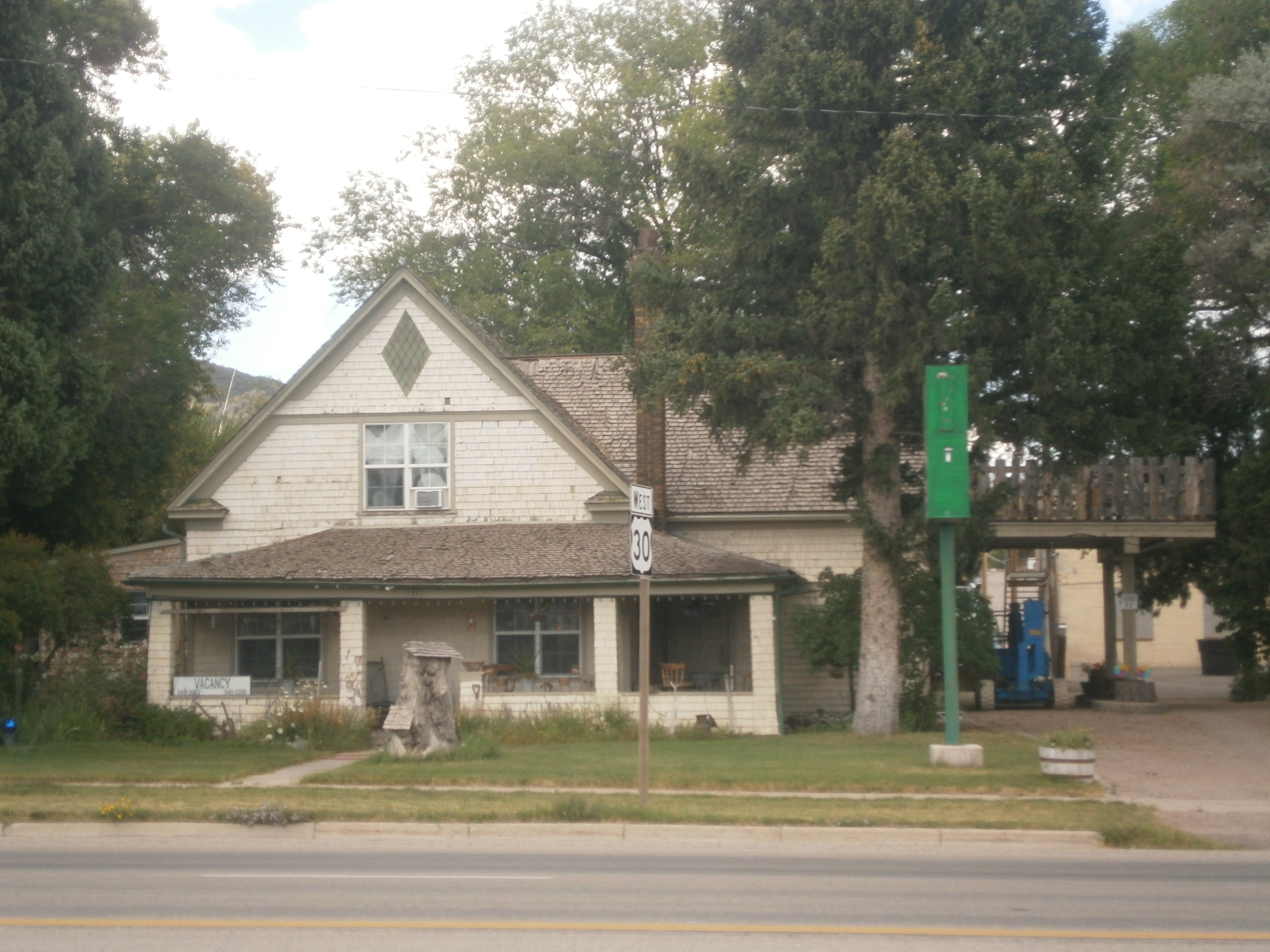

- Location within Idaho Location within the United States
- Location: 30 West Second South St., Soda Springs, Idaho
- Coordinates: 42°39′18″N 111°36′13″W
- Area: 0.4 acres (0.16 ha)
- Built: c.1899, 1938, 1976, 1990-91
- Architectural style: Shingle Style
- NRHP reference No.: 91001870
- Added to NRHP: December 23, 1991

The Edgar Walter Largilliere Sr. House, located at 30 West Second South St. in Soda Springs, Idaho, was built in 1938. It was listed on the National Register of Historic Places in 1991.

The house was built in about 1899 and was extensively remodeled in 1938 for Edgar Largilliere to be a substantive house. The house was originally covered with shingles and later additions, including to serve as a bank in 1976, also were shingle-covered.

It has also been known as The Breadbasket, after its 1990-91 further renovation to serve as a restaurant and bakery.
