= Lander Road =

- U.S. National Register of Historic Places
- Location within Idaho Location within the United States
- Location: Northeast of Soda Springs, Idaho in the Caribou National Forest, south of State Highway 34
- Coordinates: 42.881944°N 111.185278°W
- Area: 245 acres (0.99 km^{2})
- Built: 1858
- Built by: Frederick W. Lander
- NRHP reference No.: 75000627
- Added to NRHP: April 24, 1975

Lander Road, located northeast of Soda Springs, Idaho, was listed on the National Register of Historic Places in 1975.

It is a historic road used by wagons, designed by Frederick W. Lander.
