= Aircraft Recognition (magazine) =

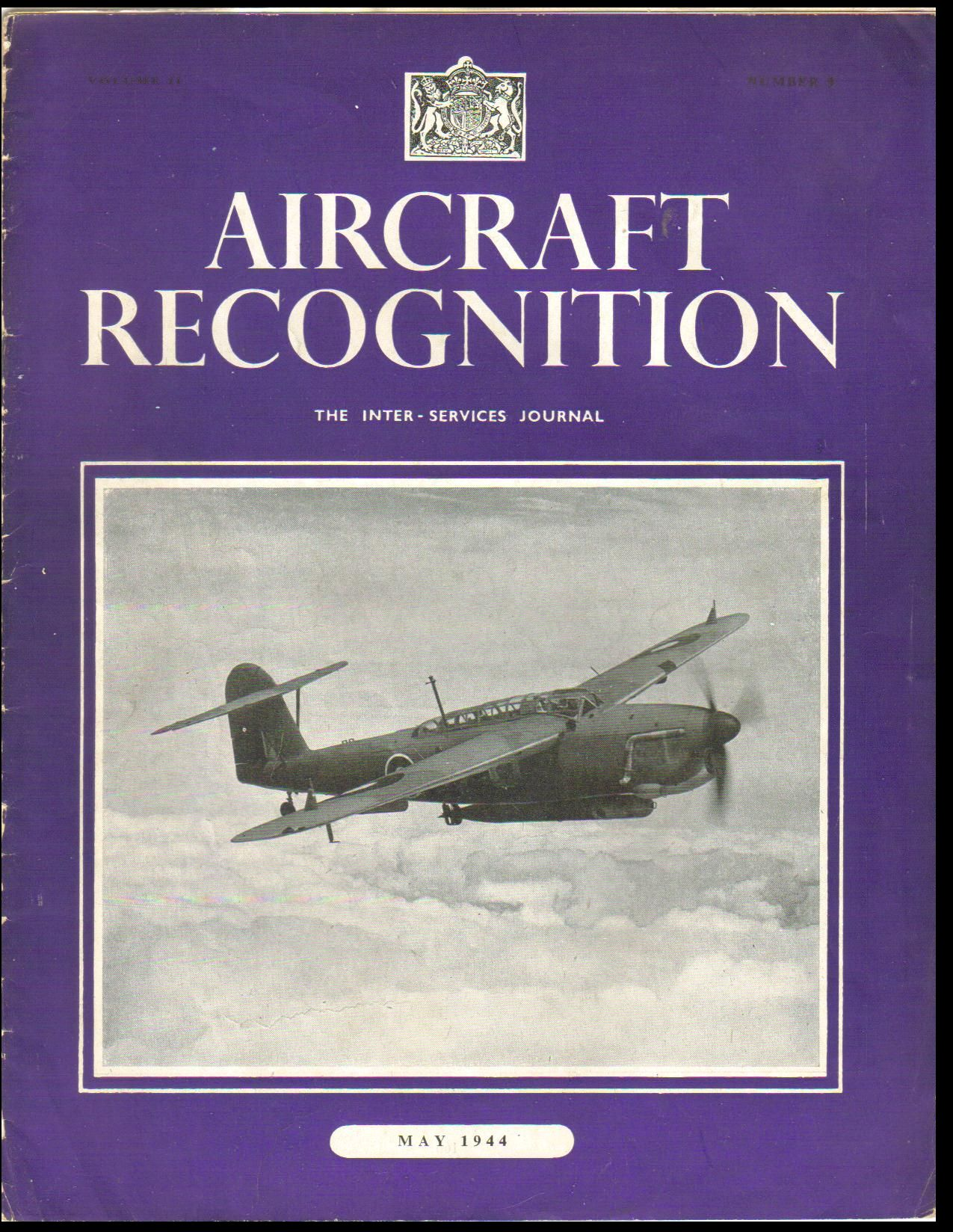
- Cover of issue for May 1944 - Volume II Number 9
- Chairman of the Editorial Committee: Peter G Masefield M.A. A.F.R.Ae.S
- Frequency: Monthly
- Publisher: HMSO
- First issue: September 1942
- Final issue Number: September 1945; Volume III Number 13
- Company: Ministry of Aircraft Production
- Country: United Kingdom
- Based in: London

Aircraft Recognition, subtitled The Inter-Services Journal was a British Second World War magazine dedicated to the subject of aircraft recognition. Published monthly by the Ministry of Aircraft Production between September 1942 and September 1945, the target audience of the magazine was members of all three British Armed Services (Army, Royal Navy and Royal Air Force) as well as members of the Royal Observer Corps.

== Background ==
At the start of the Second World War, the subject of aircraft recognition had a very low priority among the British armed forces with the exception of the Army Anti-Aircraft Command. It was also a topic that was outside the brief of the Observer Corps whose duties were limited to the reporting of aircraft as "Friendly Fighters", "Bombers", "Hostile" or "Unidentified. However many members of the Observer Corps did take an active interest in the subject of aircraft recognition. The only aids issued to assist with aircraft recognition were the Air Ministry Publications AP.1480, official silhouettes of aircraft, and AP.1764, Aircraft Recognition. The low priority afforded to the topic was well instanced as early as 6 September 1939 when the Battle of Barking Creek, a friendly fire incident, occurred resulting in the death of a British fighter pilot and the loss of two Hawker Hurricanes.

The Battle of Barking Creek, other friendly fire incidents and the paucity of material on the subject of aircraft recognition led to the formation of an Aircraft Recognition Wing within the Army Anti-Aircraft Command. On a very limited budget the first course started at RAF Biggin Hill in February 1940 training 36 officers and men in the subject of aircraft recognition. The topic also started to come to the attention of the Inter-Service Recognition Committee that had been formed in 1939 to deal mainly with air-to-ground and air-to-sea signalling to indicate friendly status and by the end of 1940 all three services realised that more work was needed to improve aircraft recognition.

Concurrently, there were a number of developments taking place outside the armed services. In December 1939 a group of Observer Corps volunteers in Guildford organised a meeting to discuss improving aircraft recognition, the meeting became known as the "Hearkers Club School of Instruction" and the first lecture was delivered by Peter Masefield, technical editor of The Aeroplane. Masefield was to play a leading role in the launch and direction taken by Aircraft Recognition. The first Hearkers Club was such a success that others followed and by Spring 1940 there were nine branches and a supporting publication-The Hearkers Club Bulletin. In the bulletin and in The Aeroplane Masefield explained his techniques in aircraft recognition:

Different people, new to the game, are adopting various methods to try to spot particular types of aeroplanes at a distance. Some look for distinctive features, such as motors, wings, tails, gun turrets and so on in a certain order and identify by a procees of elimination. This method is excellent for a start, but is far too slow, laborious and meticulous to be of much use at the distance and speed at which positive identification will be vitally necessary when the real offensive begins. A useful analogy is that of a meeting a stranger for the first time, such as bushy eyebrows or prominent teeth. The general impression is the thing that counts, one knows one's father from his general appearance, not his detailed peculiarities although the small details are well known and go to form a composite picture which affords the instant recognition from any angle. The position is just the same with aeroplanes. When a type is really familiar it can be recognised at once by its general "sit" in the air. Little details, an underslung motor, a rounded wingtip, the position of the tailplane, all merge to form one complete whole which is perfectly distinctive.

— Peter Masefield, The Aeroplane 22 December 1939

Throughout the rest of 1940 Masefield campaigned for a separate publication dedicated to aircraft recognition and on 2 January 1941, Temple Press, the publishers of The Aeroplane launched The Aeroplane Spotter edited by Masefield. It incorporated The Hearkers Club Bulletin and while remaining an independent publication received official backing when the Air Ministry and the War Office placed subscriptions for the magazine for all RAF stations and Anti-Aircraft Command units. Among the contributors Masefield used was artist and caricaturist E. A. "Chris" Wren whose series of drawings called "Oddentification" portray aircraft with exaggerated features to emphasise the salient recognition points. As well as the armed forces and the Observer Corps there were a large number of civilian "Spotters Clubs" formed who also contributed information towards the air defence of Great Britain despite not receiving any official recognition.

With these wide variety of involved organisations the Inter-Service Recognition Committee was instructed by the Air Council to "Conduct an investigation into the state of aircraft recognition training and the methods of production and distribution of aircraft recognition material". The committee did not report until early 1942 when it concluded that having one body controlling training on aircraft recognition was not possible; but that there ought to be co-ordination between the armed and civil defence services and that there should be rationalisation of training materials. It was this last point that led the Inter-Service Recognition Committee to decide, in June 1942, to establish its own publication (A lesser point was the saving of purchasing large numbers of copies of The Aeroplane Spotter).

== Aircraft Recognition ==
The first issue of the magazine was published in September 1942. There was an editorial committee of seven under the chairmanship of Masefield; although Masefield wrote most of the early editions himself. Classified at a low grade it was distributed free through official channels but could be read by anyone who could obtain a copy. The emphasis of the magazine was to be on training and aircraft recognition techniques along the lines proposed by Masefield.

=== Contents ===
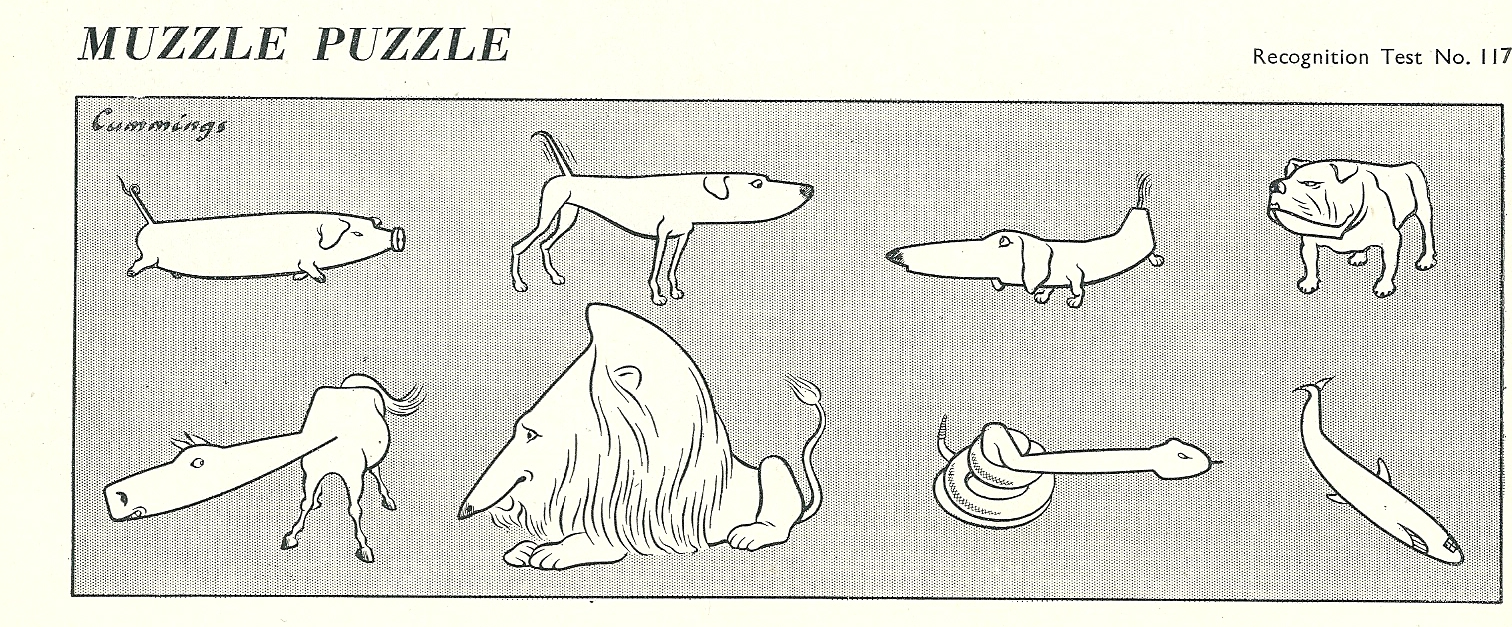
Muzzle Puzzle - a Cummings cartoon test from Volume III number 8

Each edition consisted of a mix of written articles on the theory and practice of aircraft recognition and practical tests as well as occasional items on other subjects of interest; for example the first issue contained three articles on the subject of aircraft recognition, two articles on specific aircraft types, four sets of recognition tests and an article on the interpretation of aerial photographs.

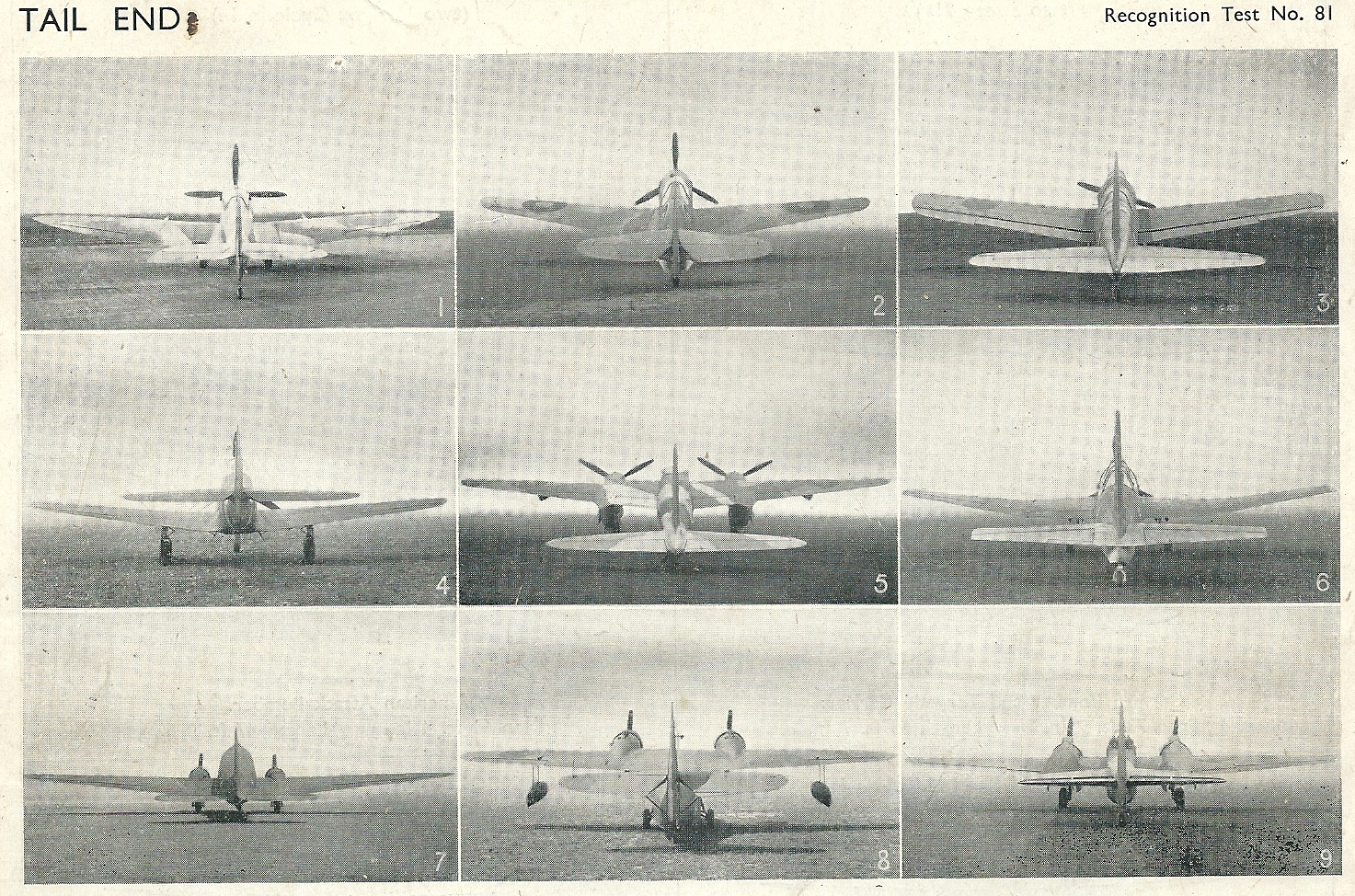
Tail End - a photographic test from Volume II number 9

In each issue there was a variety of tests; regular types included "Flying photographs" - series of pictures of aircraft in flight, and "Sillographs" - solid silhouettes of (normally) threequarter views. Other tests included series of photos taken from a particular aspect e.g. from behind, or "On the spot" - small head on photos of one Allies and one Axis aircraft challenging the reader to differentiate friend from foe. A regular contributor to most issues was the cartoonist Michael Cummings who continued the style of Wren's "Oddentifications" by submitting recognition tests in the form of cartoons and caricatures. Other contributors included Charles Gibbs-Smith and Russell Brockbank. High quality photos were used wherever possible using photographers from the RAF Film Production Unit based at RAF Benson.

With the end of the War in Europe in May 1945, the emphasis of material changed to concentrate on aircraft likely to be encountered in the Pacific theatre of operations. In June 1945 the security rating of the journal was raised to Restricted although this was more an excuse to cut the number of copies produced rather than a genuine security need. With the publication of the September 1945 issue (Volume III number 13) production was suspended as there was no further need for the magazine.

== Post war ==
Less than a year after publication ceased it was recognised that there was a continuing need to study aircraft recognition and the journal was resurrected under the slightly different name of the Inter-Services Aircraft Recognition Journal. In 1950 the name was changed to the Joint Services Recognition Journal broadening its scope to include ships and vehicles as well as aircraft. A final name change took place in 1993 to the Defence Recognition Journal until publication ceased in 2009.
