= Soda Springs City Hall =

- Soda Springs City Hall Old City Hall
- U.S. National Register of Historic Places
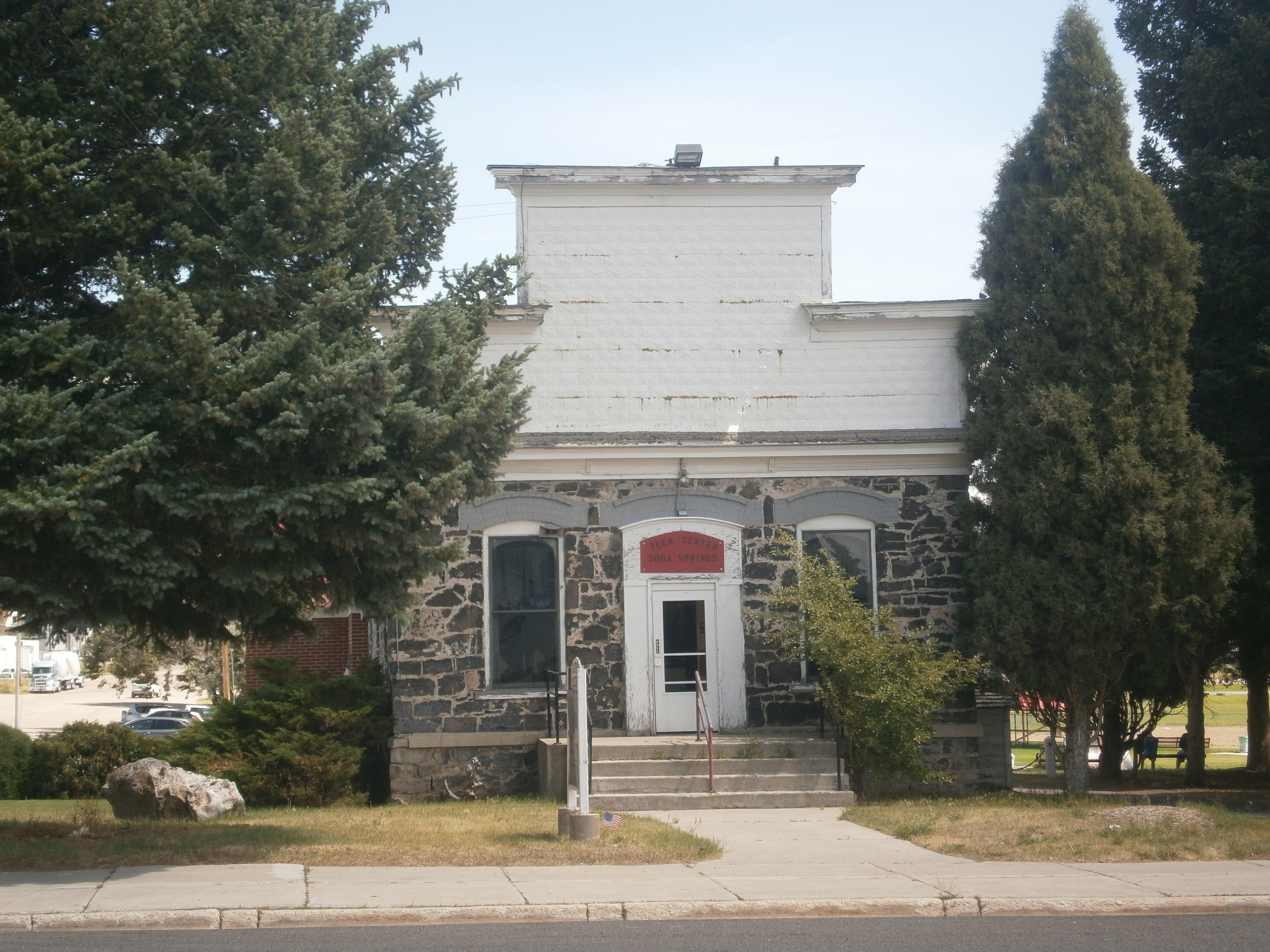

- Location within Idaho Location within the United States
- Location: 109 S. Main St., Soda Springs, Idaho
- Coordinates: 42°39′24″N 111°36′8″W
- Area: 1.3 acres (0.53 ha)
- Built: 1902
- Built by: Gagon, Sam
- Architectural style: Vernacular, Boom Town
- NRHP reference No.: 93000385
- Added to NRHP: May 14, 1993

Soda Springs City Hall, located at 109 S. Main St. in Soda Springs, Idaho was built in 1902. It was listed on the National Register of Historic Places in 1993.

It has also been known as Soda Springs City Police Station. The building was deemed "historically significant as it is the only extant building associated with the early village government of one of Idaho's oldest cities, and which housed the civic offices for three quarters of a century. Architecturally, it is one of the few remaining examples of a vernacular style using lava rock, an abundant local building material. It is also one of the few remaining buildings with a boomtown false front, although this was once a prevalent feature of Soda Springs' commercial streetscape." It currently is the local scout house for boys and girls.
