= Soda Springs Geyser =

Artificial carbonated spring in Idaho, US

Coordinates: 42°39′26.1″N 111°36′18.7″W

The Soda Springs Geyser is an Artesian well drilled into the carbonated aquifer that lies beneath Soda Springs, Idaho. Thousands of natural springs in the area were a landmark on the Oregon Trail.

Eruption of the Soda Springs Geyser

== The Springs ==
"Past volcanic activity has shaped the landscape, and the residual geothermal activity has caused the numerous hot bubbling springs that gave it its name. Geothermal activity hundreds of feet below the ground heats water and mixes in carbon dioxide gas. Soda Springs gets its name from the naturally carbonated water. The resulting increased pressure contributes to the number of springs and was the cause of the geyser."

== History ==
The Oregon Trail passed through Soda Springs. At the time it was known as the "Oasis of Soda Springs". Between Fort Laramie and Fort Boise, Soda Springs was a major landmark and is the second oldest settlement in Idaho. Sulphur Springs was the first hot spring that the Oregon Trail immigrants encountered in the soda springs area. Pyramid springs was discovered by fur trappers and pioneers, they discovered the springs by noticing mounds of soda formed rock and clay. John Kirk Townsend said in his diary, “Our encampment on the 8th was near what are called the’White Clay pits,” still on Bear River. The soil is soft chalk, white and tenacious: and in the vicinity are several springs of strong super carbonated water which bubble up with all the activity of artificial fountains. The taste was very agreeable and refreshing, resembling Saratoga water but not so saline. The whole plain to the hills is having depressions on their summits from which once issued streams of water. The extent of these eruptions, at some former period, must have been very great. At about half a mile distant, is an eruptive thermal spring of the temperature of 90 [degrees], and near this is an opening in the earth from which a stream of gas issues without water.”

== Ninety Percent Spring ==
This spring was known for its excellent water quality. Fred J. Kiesel of Ogden Utah heard of the excellent water and set up a bottling plant with W.J. Clark of Butte, MT. The product name was "Idanha." The natural mineral company was incorporated in 1887 and began distributing it around the nation and the globe. The water became so prestigious that it took first place at the Chicago's World Fair in 1893, and again in the World's Fair in Paris, France.

== The Geyser ==
On November 30, 1937, a well-drilling operation while attempting to build a natural hot springs swimming pool was surprised when it unintentionally released Soda Springs’s famous captive geyser, which surprised everyone by shooting 100 feet into the air. It has been capped, and a timer activates it once every hour on the hour. The water is about 70 degrees Fahrenheit. There is now a park and a visitor center at the site. In addition to its captive geyser, Soda Springs has an industrial lava flow from the dumping of molten rock left over from Bayer's phosphate mining and manufacturing process one mile north of the town.
