= RCAF Ground Observer Corps =

Ground Observer Corps
- Founded: October 1950
- Country: Canada
- Branch: Royal Canadian Air Force

The Ground Observer Corps (GObC) was a civilian organization within the Royal Canadian Air Force formed in October 1950 to help identify intruder aircraft in the era before the Pinetree Line radar network was fully operational. Members were required to report any sighting of an aircraft with four or more engines via Forces-supplied radios. Its formation prompted the USAF to introduce its own Ground Observer Corps the next year, and the two organizations operated in concert until both were deactivated in the late 1950s.

The force's motto was "The eyes and ears of the RCAF". While radar systems and computerized control systems were introduced through the 1950s to replace the Corps, on many occasions they demonstrated themselves far superior to the new systems. In one 1955 test, USAF Strategic Air Command bombers conducted a mock attack on North America to test the defensive network. The GObC's reports beat the radar systems by three hours.

At its height, the GObC contained 50,000 members.
