= Caribou County Courthouse =

- U.S. National Register of Historic Places
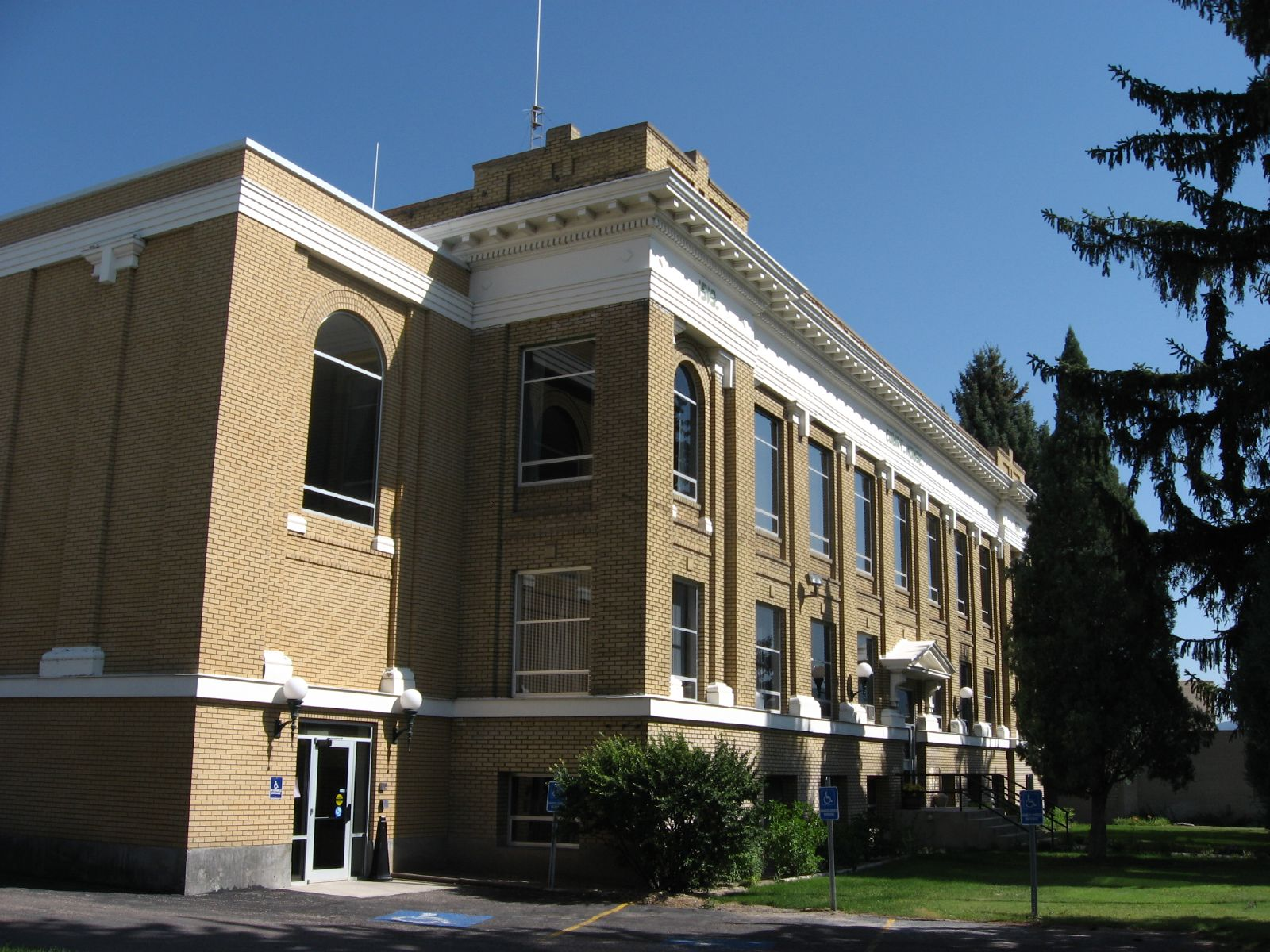

- Location within Idaho Location within the United States
- Interactive map showing the location of Caribou County Courthouse
- Location: 159 S. Main, Soda Springs, Idaho
- Coordinates: 42°39′21″N 111°36′8″W
- Area: less than one acre
- Built: 1919
- Built by: Bocker, C.K.
- Architectural style: Classical Revival
- MPS: County Courthouses in Idaho MPS
- NRHP reference No.: 87001582
- Added to NRHP: September 22, 1987

The Caribou County Courthouse, at 159 S. Main in Soda Springs in Caribou County, Idaho, was built in 1919. It is in Classical Revival style. It was listed on the National Register of Historic Places in 1987.

It is a two-story building on a raised basement. It was built for Caribou County by contractor C.K. Bocker. The county was split out of Bannock County in 1919 and, despite relatively sparse population, its citizens passed a bond resolution to pay for the courthouse in May 1919, and it was built later that year.
