= Ground Observer Corps =

United States civil defense organizations

Russian Lullaby—
Do the Russian leaders really want peace or to lull us into a sense of false security?

We Americans want to believe that the Kremlin peace overtures are sincere. We hope that the Soviet government genuinely desires to settle the differences between East and West in a peaceful manner over the conference table.

But, while we listen willingly to any of their peace proposals, we must not let ourselves be lulled into a sense of false security. Not while the Kremlin still has about 1000 long-range bombers which can strike any part of the United States.

Our Air Force and Army Anti-Aircraft defenses are on round-the-clock duty guarding against the threat of enemy air attack. But they need the help of an active and alert Ground Observer Corps to spot low-flying enemy planes that might sneak under our radar network.

So, if you are not already one of the 300,000 civilian volunteer plane spotters in the Ground Observer Corps, join now. Remember, so long as the Iron Curtain exists we must always be on guard. Never forget that eternal vigilance is still the price of liberty.

— Newspaper post in January 1955

The Ground Observer Corps (GOC), sometimes erroneously referred to as the Ground Observation Corps, was the name of an American civil defense organization during the middle 20th century.

== World War II organization ==
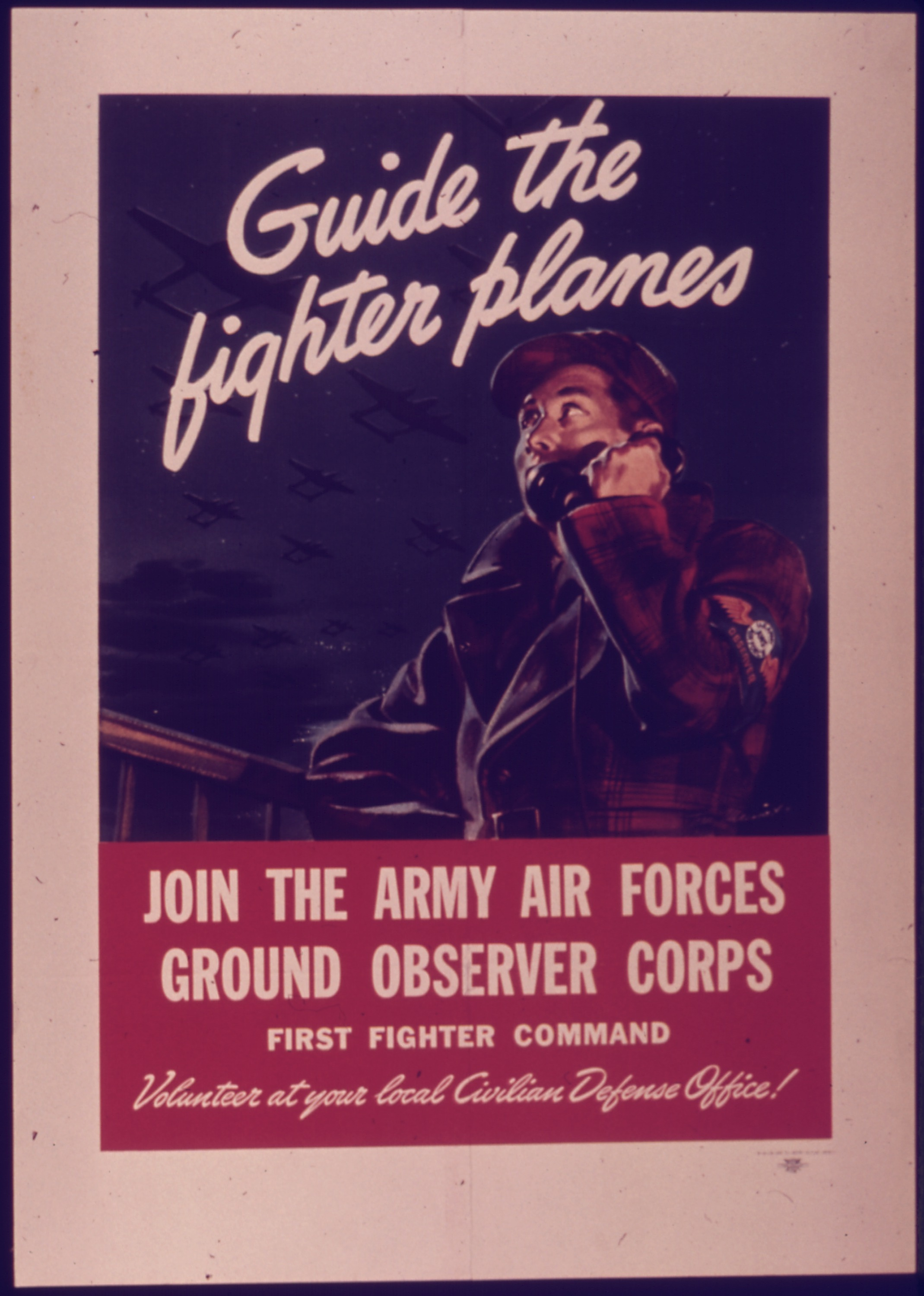
WW2-era Ground Observer Corps recruitment poster

The origins of the Ground Observer Corps was the World War II Civil Defense program of the United States Army Air Forces called the Aircraft Warning Service (AWS) which was designed to alert the US Air Force and navy to air attack or reconnaissance by the enemy and was started in 1941. Out of the AWS, grew the Ground Observer Corps (which complemented the AWS tower and rooftop watch). The 1.5 million civilian observers at 14,000 coastal observation posts performed naked eye and binocular searches to detect German or Japanese aircraft. Observations were telephoned to filter centers, which forwarded authenticated reports to AWS Filter Centers, which also received reports from Army radar stations. The program ended in 1944. A few Aircraft Warning Service Observation Towers survive as relics.

== Cold War organization ==
The second incarnation of the Ground Observer Corps, with programmatic aims and methodologies similar to the first. In February 1950, Lieutenant General Ennis C. Whitehead (Continental Air Command) proposed the formation of a new Ground Observer Corps.

Operating as an arm of the United States Air Force Civil Defense service, the second GOC supplemented the Lashup Radar Network and the Permanent System radar stations. Observations were telephoned directly to filter centers and the information was relayed to Air Defense Command ground control interception centers. By 1952 the GOC program was expanded into Operation Skywatch, consisting of 750,000 volunteers aged 7 to 86 years old working in shifts at over 16,000 posts and 73 filter centers. Extant examples of observation platforms used by GOC/Skywatch volunteers include the Cairo Skywatch Tower, the West Island tower in Fairhaven, Massachusetts (originally part of a World War II-era anti-submarine Fire-control system), and a tower in Soda Springs, Idaho.

The second GOC program ended in 1958 with the advent of automated Army (Missile Master) and Air Force (SAGE) radar systems. GOC volunteers were encouraged to continue their service in the Radio Amateur Civil Emergency Service (RACES).

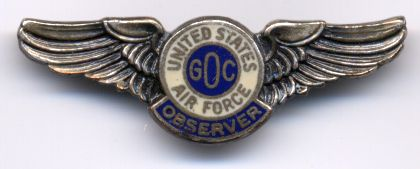
1950s civilian GOC pin

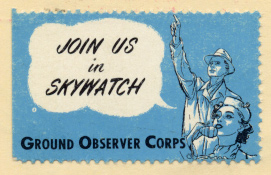
1950s civilian Skywatch recruiting sticker

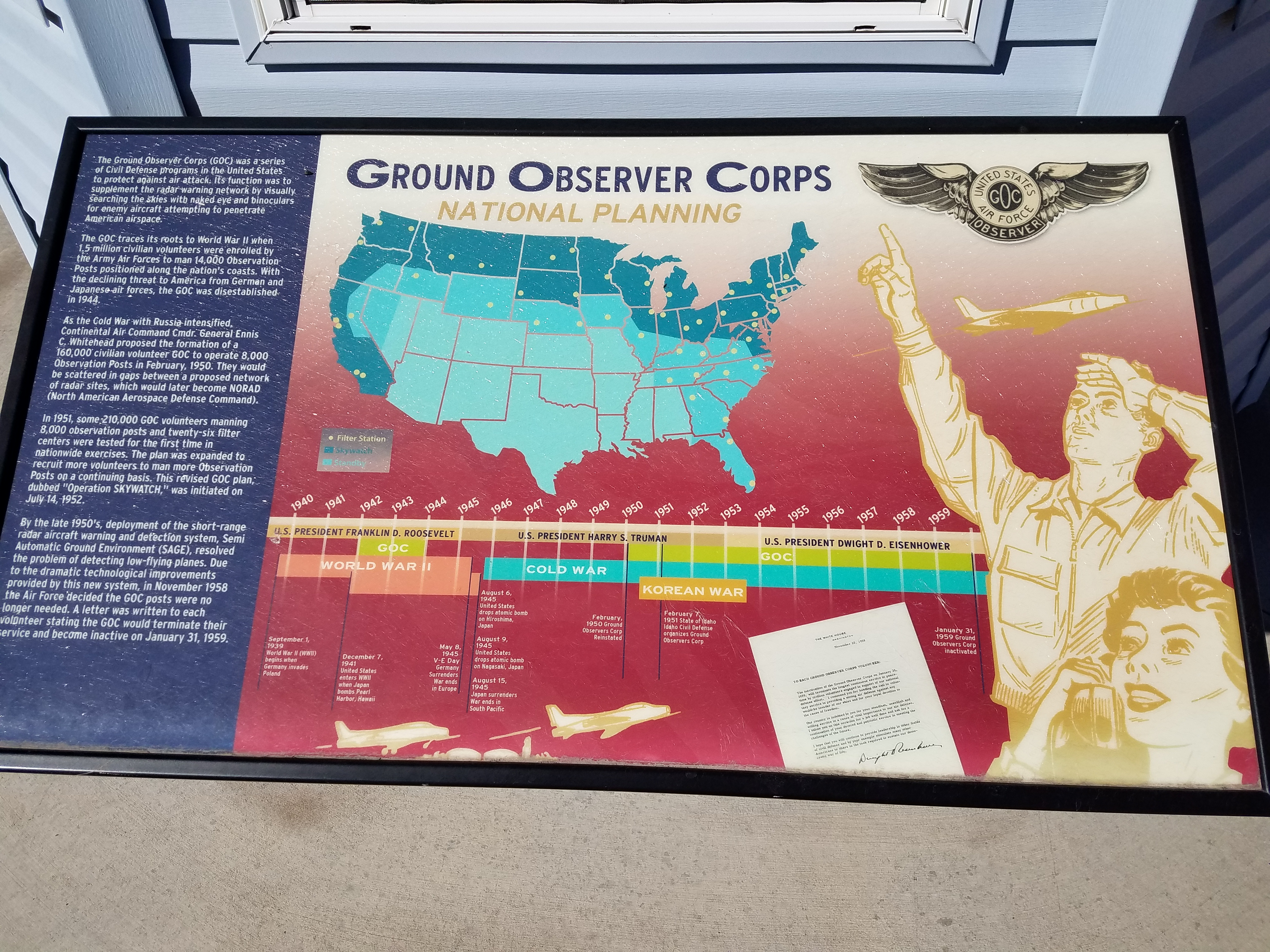
Map of Ground Observer Corps stations

== Popular culture ==
The GOC was a story element in the 1957 science fiction film The Deadly Mantis.

External image
- 1952 map

== See also ==
- Aircraft recognition
- Aircraft Identity Corps (Canada)
- Volunteer Air Observers Corps (Australia)
- Royal Observer Corps (United Kingdom)
- Aircraft Detection Corps Newfoundland
