= Volunteer Air Observers Corps (Australia) =

WWII air defence organisation

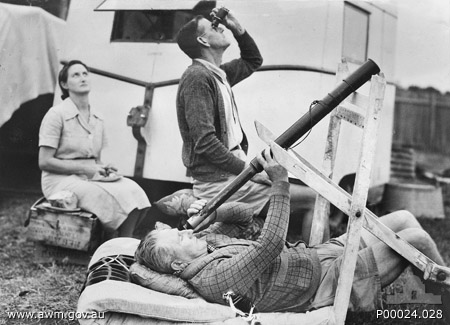
- A VAOC observation post in 1943
- Active: 1941- 1946
- Country: Australia
- Branch: Royal Australian Air Force
- Type: Civil defence organisation.
- Role: Aircraft recognition and reporting
- Engagements: World War II

The Volunteer Air Observers Corps (VAOC) was an Australian air defence organisation of World War Two. The VAOC was formed in December 1941 to support the Royal Australian Air Force (RAAF) with its main roles of sighting and observing aircraft over Australia. The VAOC swiftly established thousands of Observation Posts (OP) across the country and provided information to the RAAF's regional air control posts.

As the threat to Australia on the home front declined, the VAOC's role was expanded to include coast watching, assisting air traffic control, weather reporting and fire spotting.

The VAOC was staffed by civilian volunteers and reached an estimated peak strength in 1944 of about 24,000 personnel and 2,656 Observation Posts. After the end of the war, the VAOC was reduced to a cadre in December 1945 before being disbanded on 10 April 1946.

Many RAAF Officers had been to Britain before the war and the VAOC was modelled on the successful Royal Observer Corps.

== Lead up to war ==
The total Australian coastline is some 60,000 km long and littered with no less than 8,222 minor islands, making it very vulnerable to attack from every point of the compass.

The surprise attack on the US Fleet at Pearl Harbor with the simultaneous and rapid advancement of the Japanese Imperial Army across the South Pacific in late 1941 was a shock to Australian citizens.

== The urgent need for observers ==
The federal government appointed the Royal Australian Air Force (RAAF) as responsible for developing an effective early warning system against attack. Prior to the War, the RAAF was small enough for all its elements to be directly controlled by Headquarters based in Melbourne with its main base at Point Cook. The Southern Area Command was one of several geographically based subdivisions raised during WW2.

Planning had commenced earlier but on Christmas Day 1941 the serving members of the Australian Air Board met to examine the current war situation. They sent a signal later that day instructing that the Volunteer Air Observers Corp (VAOC) was to be urgently organised with the objective of establishing Observation Posts (OP) staffed by civilian volunteers.

The VAOC were to maintain a 24-hour watch along the coast from Cairns in Queensland to Ceduna in South Australia and from Albany to Geraldton in Western Australia with rings of observations posts at a radius of 50 miles and 100 miles around Townsville, Brisbane, Newcastle, Sydney, Melbourne, Hobart, Adelaide and Perth.

The coastal strips, each with a network of Observation Posts (OP) reporting to their own Zone Control Post would act as early warning and relay sightings of aircraft to a central State Control room in each capital city. The State control room was intended to have knowledge and oversight of all aircraft movement and notify fighter aircraft to intercept where necessary.

Observation Posts along the coast were also required to report shipping and submarine sightings as well as provide weather reports twice daily for the RAAF.

The model adopted drew from the British experiences of the Royal Observer Corps which was established some years earlier and proved very effective during the Battle of Britain in 1940.

== Rapid establishment of an early warning system ==
There was every expectation that Australia would also be subject to air-raids of the intensity endured by Britain during the Blitz. By the time Darwin was bombed the VAOC was not yet operational, but by the time of the Japanese raids on Queensland targets like Cairns, Rockhampton and Townsville in 1942 thousands of VAOC volunteers were in place. These were in addition to Australian military Coastwatchers on small islands.

Australia had few fighters capable of intercepting the Japanese early in the war and the USAAF did not arrive until about March 1942.

In 1941 many Australians had never seen an aircraft or at least not close up. So the rapid establishment of a nationwide grid of Observation Posts involving thousands of civilian volunteers often in remote areas who needed to be enlisted and trained to recognise, identify and report and describe the activity of aircraft in flight was an outstanding achievement.

The system was dependent on a dependable communications network, something that did not exist at the time. In 1941 the rudimentary telephone line operated by the Post Masters General (PMG) reached into population areas like major cities but not the outback or many areas of remote coast. Alternatives such as pedal radios and even carrier pigeons were considered. The result was the "AirFlash" priority call system where the telephone exchange operator would clear all calls and connect the Observation Post the Zone Control. Predictably this caused some angst on a grand scale with normal telephone subscribers on shared party lines.

The very first Operational Post opened at Bairnsdale in Victoria on 26 December 1941, one day after the decision of the Air Board to operate a volunteer corp. Bairnsdale was already a busy RAAF operational training airfield at the time. The remainder of the Bairnsdale Zone was operational a few weeks later on 17 February 1942.

In Melbourne, the Preston Town Hall was commandeered while rooms under Sydney cricket grounds and part of the University of Western Australia were pressed into service as State Control Centres. Hobart football ground and the Brisbane town hall were all used as State Sector Commands. These were operated by WAAAF personnel but by 1943 VAOC Observers would take over with RAAF liaison Officers. The State Zone Commanders were also civilians. The VAOC personal posted to Air Sector Victoria at Preston Town Hall reached nearly 350 by the wars end. There would have been similar number in all the other capital cities.

In Australian airspace by late 1943 there were thousands of aircraft movement every day with the combined USAAF and RAAF flights as well as civilian and commercial flights. All of this was tracked and plotted manually with the assistance of the VAOC in the field recording the numbers and aircraft type, speed, elevation and their direction. Flights could last several hours and transit two or more States and were tracked across borders. The air observers were unable to make direct contact with aircraft by radio but sometimes signalled using lights and lanterns. Radar was in its infancy in Australia.

== Recruitment ==
Sufficient information was released to the media to encourage community members to attend meetings to hear of the VAOC. It was made clear that even though they were volunteers the commitment was for the duration of the War. Much of the work fell to Squadron Leader J. V. Gray who travelled extensively to not only establish the network but recruit and support the VAOC volunteers. Forests Commission Victoria (FCV) staff were also recruited as valued members because of their presence in remote areas.

The RAAF also approached universities and high schools to seek new recruits. One success was the tower at Clyde School for Girls at Woodend, now Braemar College. Technical schools were recruited to make scale models of aircraft for teaching and identification purposes. Training films were produced.

Local councils played an important role in coordination with the townsfolk, identifying good Observation Post sites and often supplying facilities.

Shortage of equipment such as binoculars was a perennial problem and owners were required to declare them to the Government under a National Security Order. Most of the cost of maintaining the Observation Posts fell to the volunteers.

Significantly, the volunteers were mostly women from rural areas.

== Structure and operation ==
By May 1942 the VAOC was controlled by the Directorate of Pursuit, Fighter Sector Headquarters of Allied Command.

There were four levels of the VAOC structure (2656 Observation Posts, 39 regional Zone Controls, 6 State Air Sectors based in each capitol city and the RAAF Air Defence HQ in Brisbane). A system that failed from time to time.

In addition to permanent Observation Post (OP), there were a number of Reporting Posts (RP) on a station homestead or farm house where the occupant devoted as much time as they were able to the task of reporting aircraft movements. Sometimes mobile Air Reporting Officers (AROs) were utilised if they had access to telephone lines.

Each VAOC spotter had their own unique Code Name. Volunteers in Observation Posts reported aircraft movements to a Zone Control situated in a regional city or town. There were 39 Zone Controls centres across the Australia with differing numbers in each state depending on its size. For the southern State of Victoria they were at eight Control Zones based at Melbourne, Bairnsdale, Geelong, Warrnambool, Shepparton, Bendigo, Ballarat with another at Launceston in northern Tasmania. The State of Queensland had five Zone Controls and over 100 Observation Posts.

Each Zone Control reported up the line to the State Air Sector based in each of the six the Capitol Cities. The Air Sector personnel provided liaison with all the Australian armed services, the USAAF, Fighter Command as well as other adjacent States when monitoring flights across borders.

In Victoria, the VAOC were under Commanding Officer Flight Lieutenant C.W. Hyland, with Pilot Officer B.A. Clark as his Adjutant. They were based at the National Herbarium in the Botanical Gardens in Melbourne while the State Air Sector was situated at the Preston Town hall.

Each state Air Sector reported directly to RAAF Air Defence HQ which from 1942 was located in the Brisbane's AMP building where General Douglas MacArthur had his General Headquarters. The building was renamed after the war as MacArthur Chambers.

Depending on their location, some Observation Posts were very busy. The one at Wamberal on the NSW coast near Gosford recorded 38,476 aircraft of 80 different types over a three-year period to February 1945. They also provided support and assistance to four aircraft in distress. Those near busy training fields as well as those along important travel routes such as from Fisherman'd Bend aircraft factory at Melbourne to Darwin logged many delivery flights.

== Volunteer identification ==
The VAOC operated under the command of the RAAF as an auxiliary arm but unlike the Royal Observer Corps in Britain members of Australia's Volunteer Air Observer Corp were not required to wear a uniform. They only received a blue armband and later a small blue lapel pin for identification. Also, responsibilities for keeping records of volunteer service rested with the VAOC and not the RAAF and as a result the records were patchy. This oversight had ramifications after the war for volunteers seeking recognition of their efforts.

By 1944 personnel at State Air Sectors eventually received a uniform of a beige coverall and beret for the women and an unglamorous boilersuit for the few men.

Observation Posts were secret and with limit access.

== Observation Post (OP) facilities ==
Not all Observation Posts required elevation to obtain a clear 360-degree field of view, particularly on the great plains of rural Australia. Some were discarded buses, rail carriages. Some were hotel buildings and private rooftops, some operated from purpose-built concrete bunkers like the one that remains on the hill overlooking Anglesea. Town halls and other public buildings were rented in large numbers by the RAAF.

Some were elaborate structures constructed by whatever was at hand, often with donated materials and funds.

Observation Posts often coexisted with existing State forestry authority fire towers. For example, in Western Australia, Observation Posts sat on top of the Forests Department giant fire lookout tree such as the Gloucester Tree. The VAOC naturally assisted with bushfire spotting and fire communications.

Facilities such as a camp stretcher for night shifts, kerosene heaters, cooking facilities, toilets, shelter from the elements, water and power were often sparse and often provided by the volunteers or their local community. Other than a phone, clock, binoculars, aircraft identification silhouette cards, log book, a table and two chairs the RAAF did not supply comforts, nor payments for transport or any food allowances.

== Training ==
Training required skills in aircraft identification, radio use, Morse code, map reading, weather reporting. All this had to be achieved rapidly for volunteers who in many cases have never seen a real aircraft before, at least not close up.

The demand for scale models and silhouette identification cards for the increasing types of aircraft that flew the skies particularly after the USAAF arrived in great numbers could not keep up.

State and national recognition competitions where prizes were awarded were popular to hone skills.

== Submarine incursions ==
The fear of attack was real. Only weeks after the Fall of Singapore in 1942 an Air Observer at the Forests Commission's fire tower on Mount Raymond near Orbost reported the Imperial Japanese Navy I-25 submarine on the surface near the mouth of the Snowy River at Marlo. Forests Commission crews from Bruthen also identified markings on a remote beach consistent with a small boat being hauled ashore.

Then on 26 February 1942, the same submarine launched a small float plane from near King Island in Bass Strait. The two-seater Yokosuka E14Y or Glen could be quickly broken down into 12 components for storage in the hangar of the submarine. It could also be rapidly assembled ready to fly in 12 to 30 minutes. The aircraft was piloted by Nobuo Fujita and observer Shoji Okuda and they made an audacious reconnaissance flight over Melbourne's suburbs and Port Phillip Bay.

The incursion was detected and reported by no less than seven VAOC localities including Williamstown, Fisherman's Bend, Footscray, Melbourne City, South Melbourne, Mordialloc and Frankston. It even flew over anti-aircraft battery at Williamstown and despite seeking approval from higher authorities they never fired a shot.

It's also often reported that Fujita made another clandestine flight over the VAOC Foster Observation Post (situated at the Golf Club) and Wonthaggi on 20 February 1942 through to the LaTrobe Valley power stations. His objective was to identify potential bombing targets.

The submarine Japanese submarine I-25 then quietly slipped away to Hobart and then to Wellington in New Zealand for its next missions, and the whole incident remained a secret.

The well-known attack on Sydney Harbour by Japanese midget submarines launched from the larger I-25 on 31 May 1942 followed an earlier reconnaissance flight by Fujita on 17 February.

Several months later on 9 September 1942, Fujita dropped two incendiary bombs on America with the intention of starting a forest fire which was known as the Lookout Air Raid. However, the efforts of a US Forest Service patrol of fire lookouts and weather conditions not amenable to a fire and the damage by the attack was minor. The attack was the first time the contiguous United States was bombed by an enemy aircraft.

Probably the most significant incursion of a Japanese submarine in Australian waters occurred off Brisbane with the sinking of the hospital ship Centaur on 14 May 1943.

== Search and rescue ==
Because of the nature of their work following the movements of allied aircraft VAOC members were often the first to know about forced landings and crashes. Notable among them was Bob Hope and his entourage of American entertainers that made an unexpected landing on the Camden Haven River in Laurieton in August 1944. VAOC volunteers were there to rescue them from their stranded Catalina Flying Boat.

== Demobilisation and recognition ==
Each 24-hour Observation Post ideally required about 100 observers to cover all the daily and night shifts. Records of volunteers were poorly kept and estimates range from 24000 to nearly 220000 people were involved at all levels by its peak in 1944.

Volunteers worked across at all levels of the organisation from the 2656 Observation Posts, 39 Zone Controls through to six Air Sectors in the capital cities.

After the end of the war, the VAOC was reduced to a cadre in December 1945 and was disbanded on 10 April 1946.

The true scope of the VAOC was never revealed to the Australian public and the organisation was hastily dismantled by the RAAF at the conclusion of the war. Little trace remained and the service of volunteers remained unrecognised by military authorities.

The Volunteer Air Observers received a small blue lapel pin and a certificate of recognition and quietly went back to their lives leaving their amazing stories largely untold.

Of the thousands of VAOC Observation Posts there are only a few small memorials at Tallangatta, Lorne and Anglesea in Victoria, Wamberal near Gosford in NSW, Cleve in SA and Horn Island off Cape York in Queensland. In August 2020, the Victorian government announced that the Loveridge Lookout at Anglesea had been added to the Victorian Heritage Register, as one of the only two known remaining VAOC observation posts in Victoria.

== Gallery ==
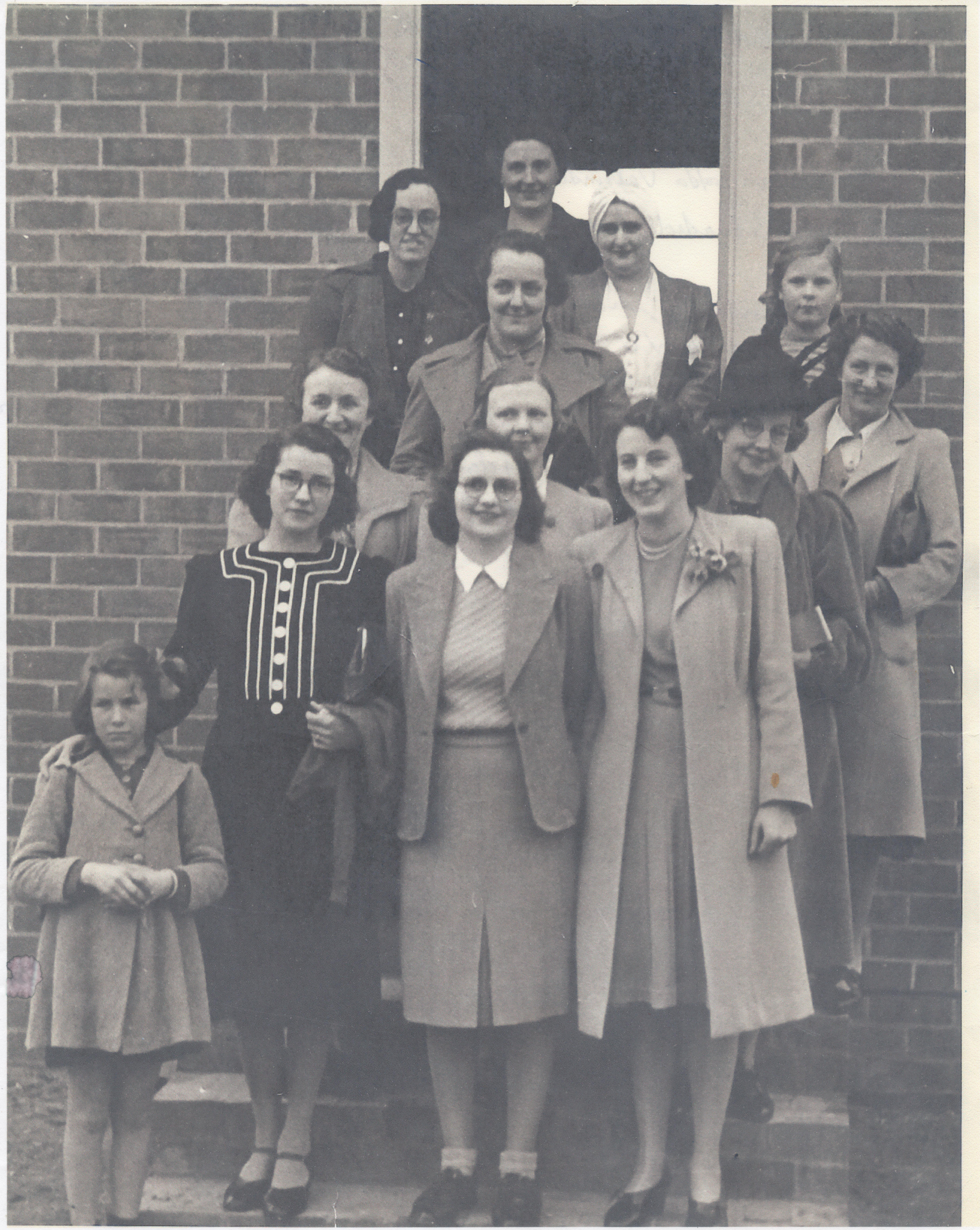
Some of Tallangatta VAOC members pose at the steps of the observation post - circa 1944. Front row from left: Olga Smith, Mrs A. Smith, Maise Tait, Thelma Butler. Second Row - Mrs Ballantyne, Helen Tait, Mrs J. L. Fisher. Third row: Madge Maddock, Mrs H. G. Heath and daughter behind. Fourth row: Miss Myrtle Ruby, unknown, Mrs Pearl Foster. Photo: Thelma Moyle.

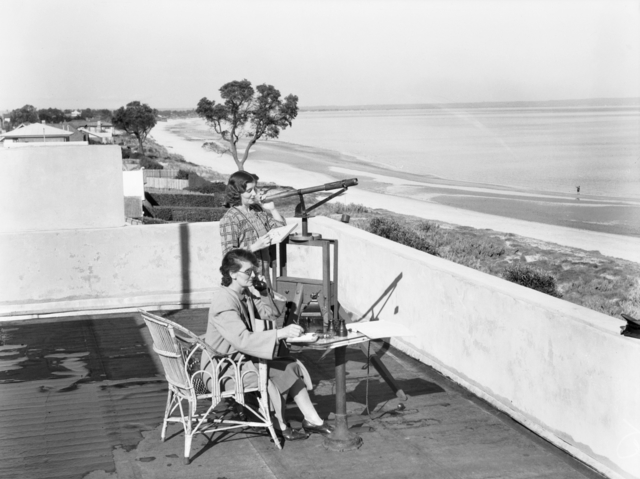

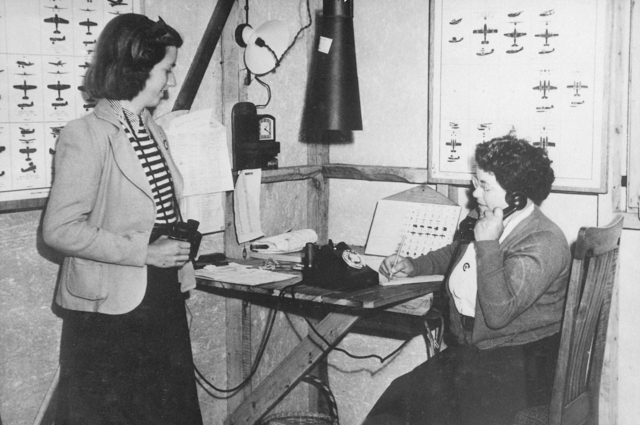

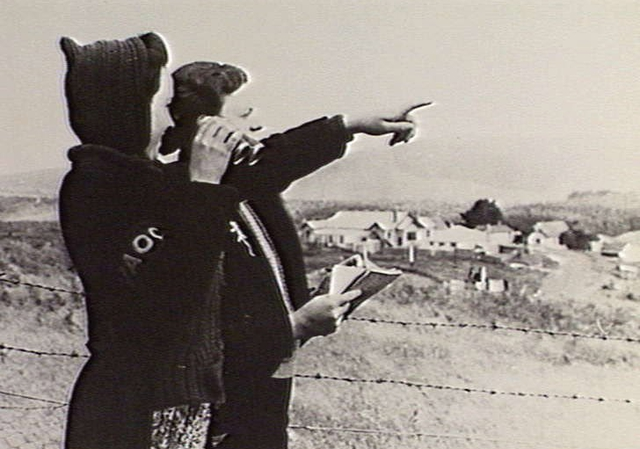

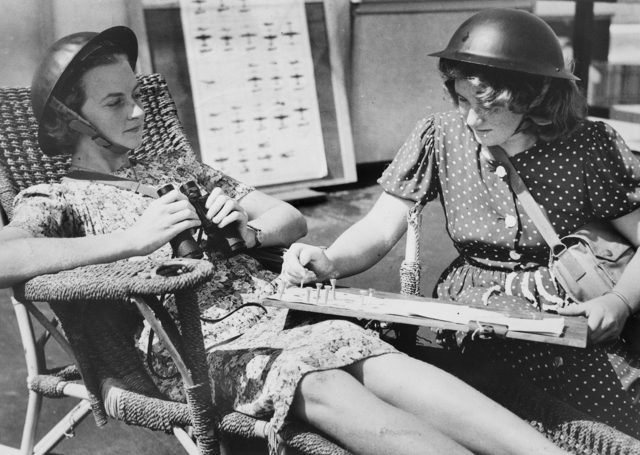

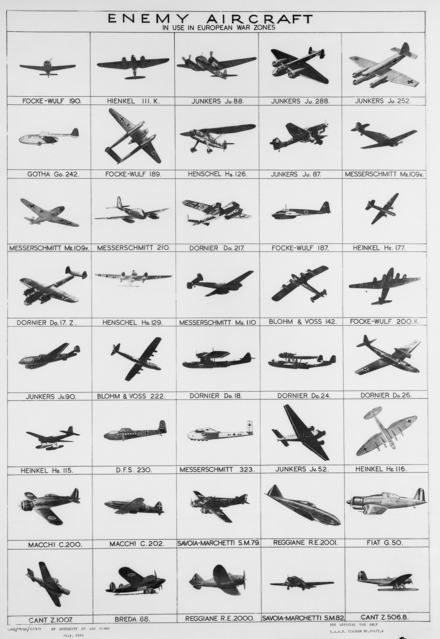

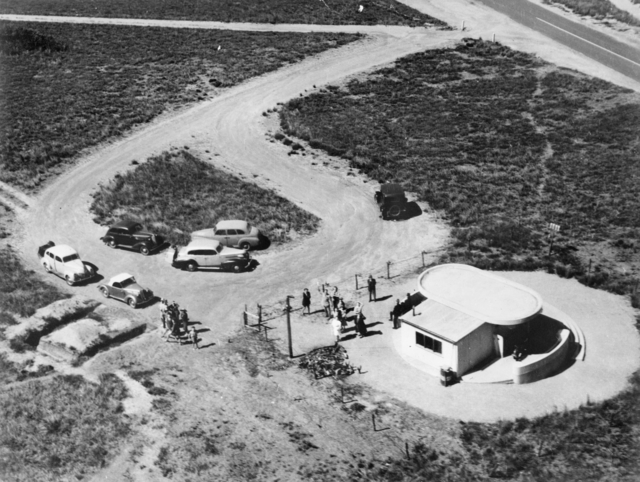

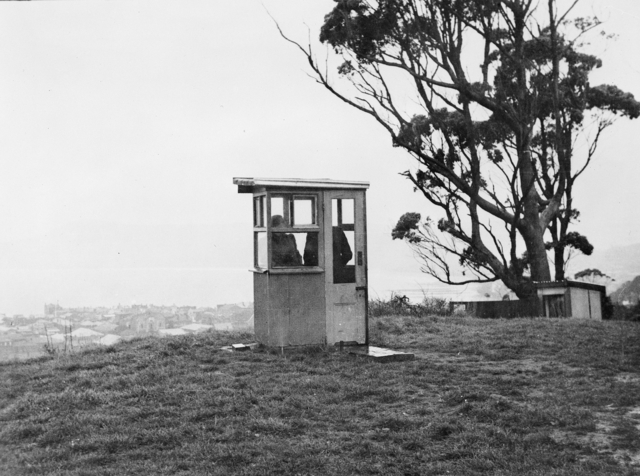

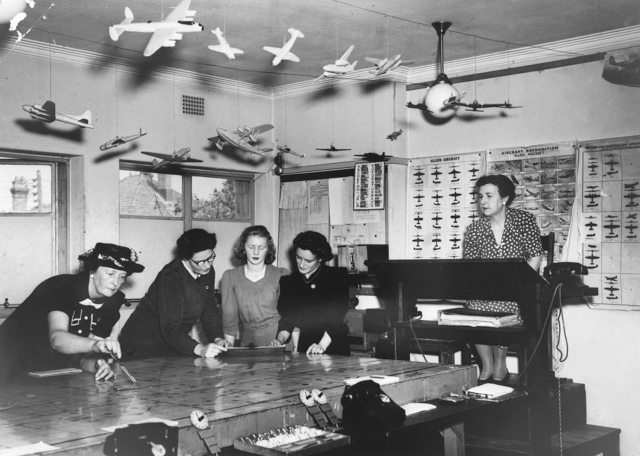

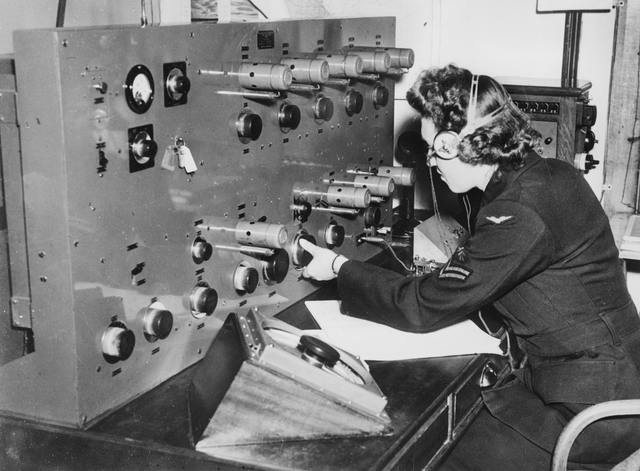

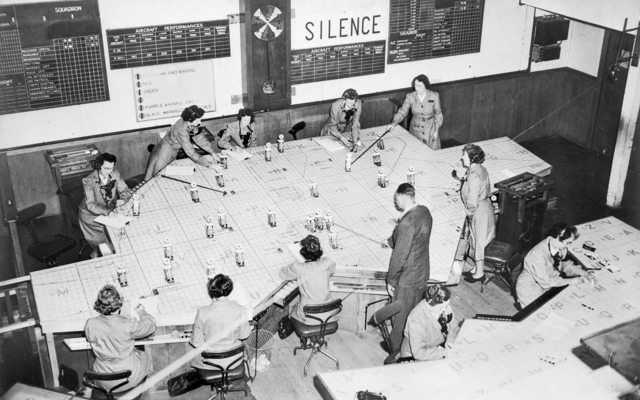

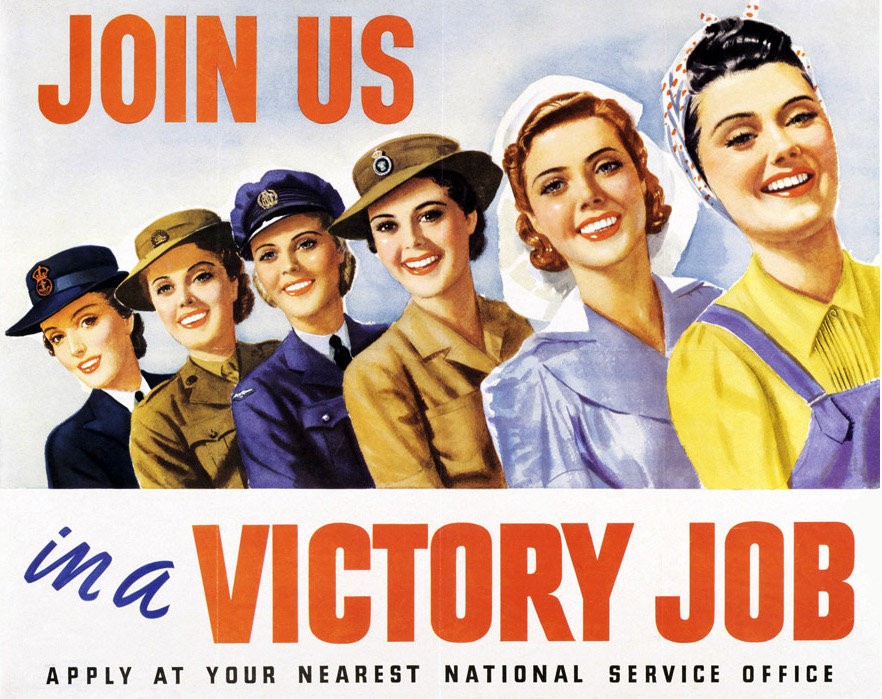

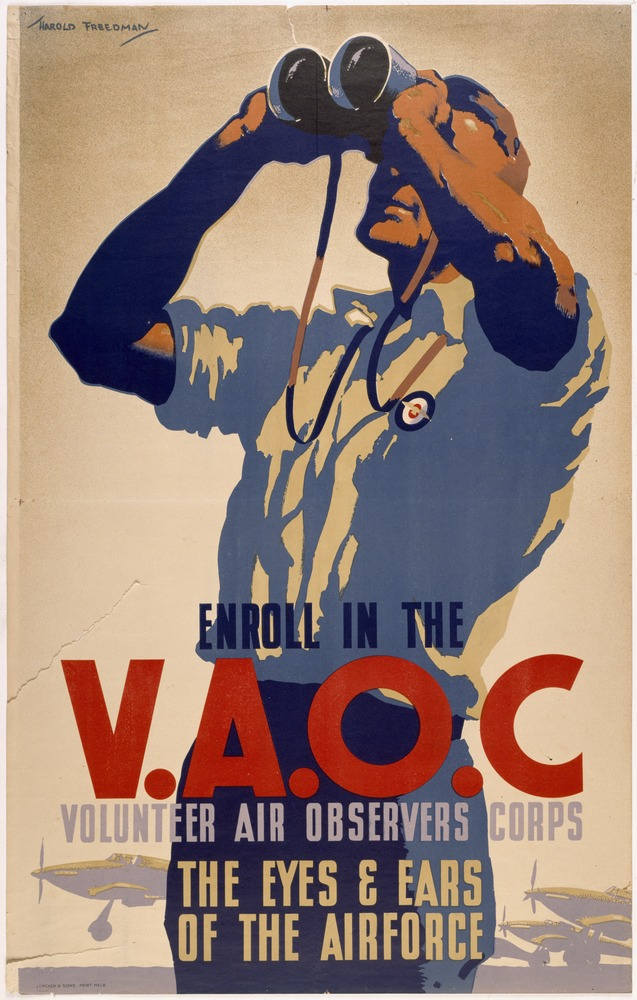

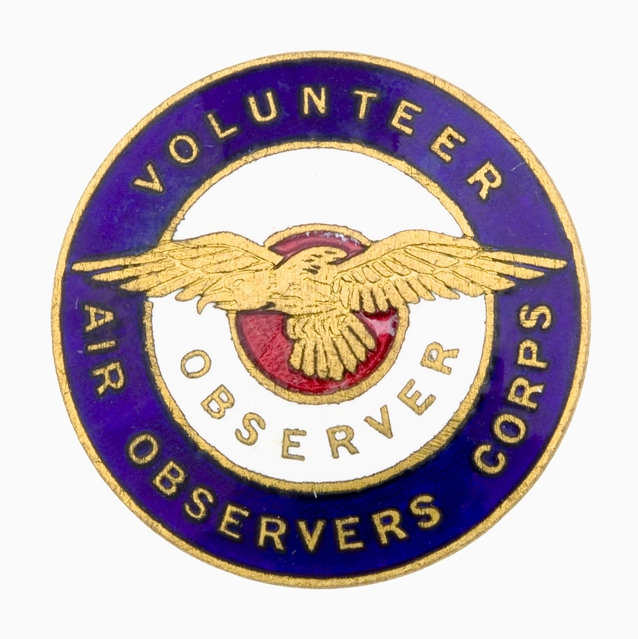

== See also ==
- Aircraft recognition
- Australian War Memorial, https://www.awm.gov.au/
- State Library of Victoria, https://www.slv.vic.gov.au/
