= Aircraft recognition =

Skill of identifying aircraft on sight

Silhouette for an F-100 Super Sabre.

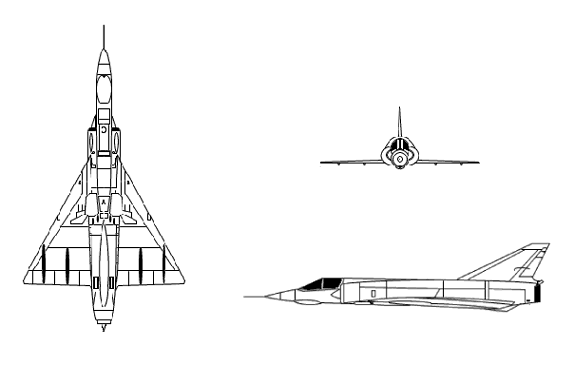
Recognition line drawing for Dassault Mirage III.

Aircraft recognition is a visual skill taught to military personnel and civilian auxiliaries since the introduction of military aircraft in World War I. It is important for air defense and military intelligence gathering.

Aircraft recognition generally depends on learning the external appearance of the aircraft, both friendly and hostile, most likely to be encountered. Techniques used to teach this information have included scale models, printed silhouette charts, slide projectors, computer aided instruction and even specially-printed playing cards.

== Early development of skills ==
In the United Kingdom, The Royal Observer Corps (ROC) was formed as a defence warning organisation with civilians trained in aircraft recognition and operated primarily as such between 1925 and 1957. Aircraft recognition was first developed between the First and Second World wars when aerial warfare was first recognised as a future threat, after 208 Zeppelin and 435 aircraft raids over London during the First World War. In 1917 Germany had started using fixed-wing bombers, and the number of airship raids diminished rapidly.

To answer this new threat, Major General Edward Bailey Ashmore, a First World War pilot who had later been in command of an artillery division in Belgium, was appointed to devise improved systems of detection, communication and control. The Metropolitan Observation Service was created, covering the London area, known as the London Air Defence Area, and was soon extended to the coasts of Kent and Essex. This led to the establishment of the Observer Corps in 1925.

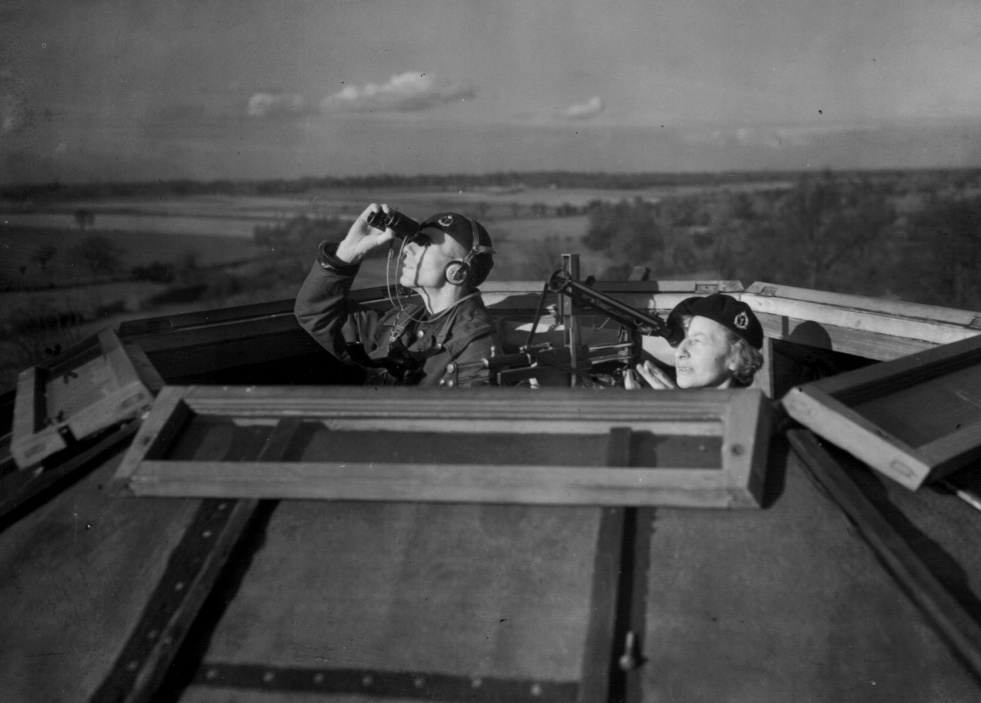
Royal Observer Corps aircraft spotters in an Orlit post during World War II

It was the creed of the British War Department and the Air Ministry, at the start of the war, that accurate recognition of high-flying and fast-moving aircraft was not possible. The spare-time volunteers of the Observer Corps disagreed and between 1938 and 1939 they started developing the skills and training materials to achieve it, on an unofficial basis.

Local units began to band together and form spotting clubs caller Hearker clubs that eventually combined in April 1941 as The Royal Observer Corps Club and prepared early aircraft type silhouette cards for both allied and German types, mostly made by tracing photographs from The Aeroplane magazine, with some made by enlarging silhouettes from commercially produced 1930s cigarette card sets. Technical editor of The Aeroplane, Peter Masefield, who was also a member of the Corps, travelled the length of Britain giving lectures and training sessions.

The club also produced a fortnightly magazine, The Aeroplane Spotter, with the help of The Aeroplane's printers, that was eventually distributed to every unit in the Corps. Large wall posters were produced that showed every known type of aircraft. The WEFT (Wingshape, Engine configuration, Fuselage shape and Tail type) system of recognition was first developed by Chief Observer C.H. Gibbs-Smith of Watford Group's Delta 3 post and a member of Hearker Club No. 3.

Recognition competitions were organised locally, regionally and nationally and by the start of World War II the Corps had trained nearly 30,000 volunteers to accurately recognise all types of current aircraft. The unofficial Aeroplane Spotter magazine was later renamed as The Journal of the Royal Observer Corps Club before being adopted as an official publication and renamed as The Royal Observer Corps Journal published by HMSO and distributed to every observer at a price of one shilling (5 new pence).

In April 1942 the club initiated recognition proficiency tests, later adopted officially by the ROC, with three levels:

- 3rd Class level (later renamed Basic level) – 50% correct
- 2nd Class level (later renamed Intermediate level) – 70% correct
- 1st Class level (later renamed Master level) – 90% or more correct

In September 1942 the government recognised the usefulness and effectiveness of the systems developed by the spare-time observers and first published Aircraft Recognition: The Inter-services Recognition Journal with early content copied from previous editions of Aeroplane Spotter and The Royal Observer Corps Journal. Featured tests included Airborne Headaches and Amuse and Confuse.

With official recognition by HQ Royal Observer Corps and the Air Ministry that accurate recognition of aircraft was achievable, the systems developed by the volunteers were adopted as official training. The Royal Observer Corps Club disbanded in the autumn of 1942. In December 1943 the annual Master Test of aircraft recognition was introduced as a compulsory test for all observers and a basic level pass was mandatory for continued membership of the ROC. In the first year those observers who had achieved a club pass at 3rd class level were declared exempt from the basic test requirement.

The Royal Observer Corps established an annual four-man recognition team, with keen competition amongst observers for selection. The team continued to compete annually in the UK's Joint Services Aircraft Recognition Competition and in international competitions with other NATO countries until 1991, despite aircraft recognition being dropped as an operational role for the Corps in 1957. There was also a hard-fought annual competition with the Luftmeldekorpsett, the Danish Ground Observer Corps.

== Aircraft recognition in the United States ==
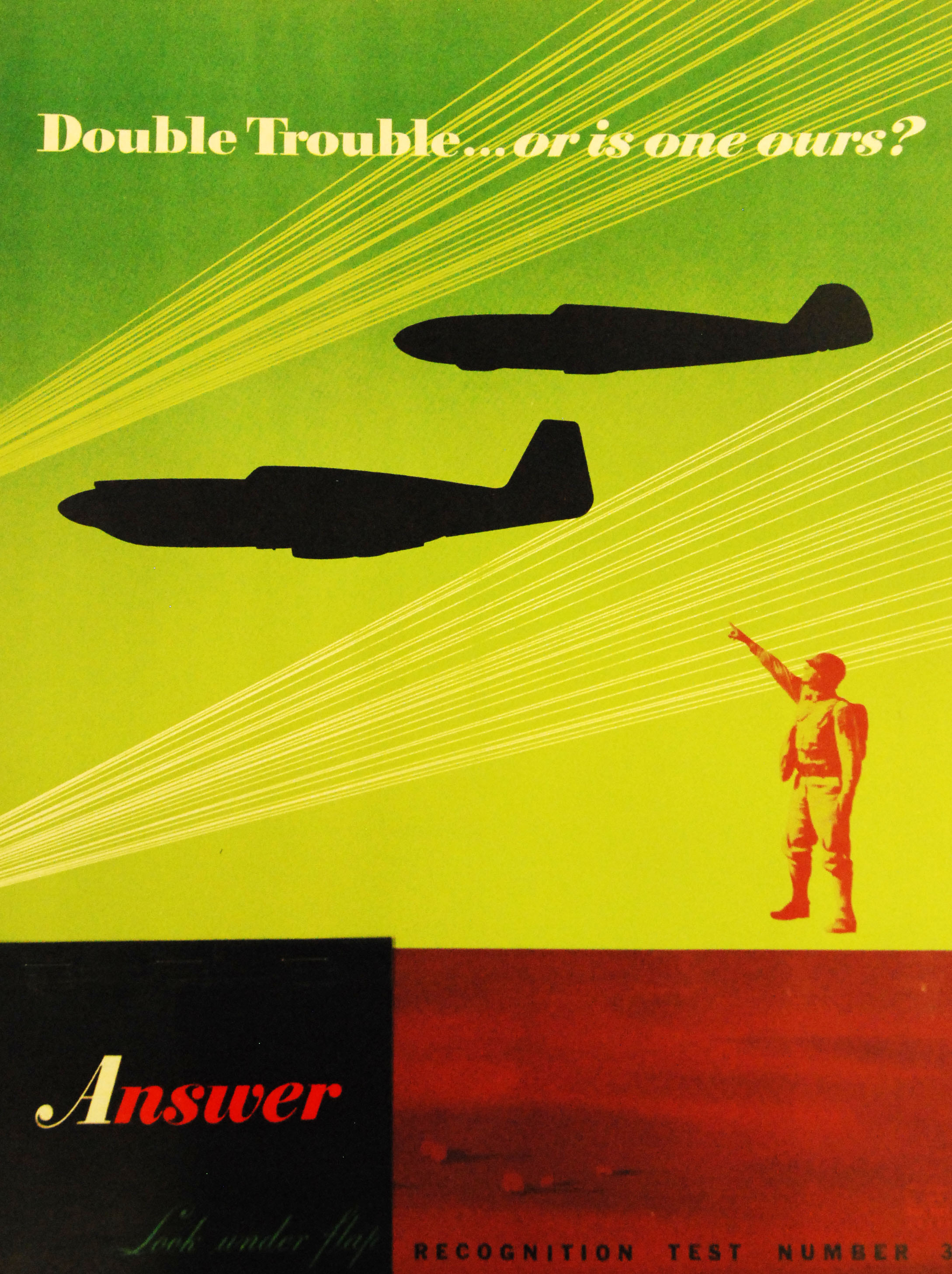
Test of aircraft recognition with a P-51 Mustang Fighter below a Messerschmitt Bf 109

In the US during World War II, civilians were enlisted into a Ground Observer Corps to support air defense operations, receiving training in aircraft identification.

The US military continues to use "WEFT" as a mnemonic for the major features of an aircraft: Wings or rotors to provide lift, Engines to provide power, a Fuselage to carry the payload and pilot, and a Tail assembly which controls the direction of flight. These elements differ in shape, size, number, and position. The differences distinguish one aircraft type from another. The individual components can be taught as separate recognition and identification features, but it is the composite of these features that must be learned to recognize and identify an aircraft.

== Aircraft recognition as a pastoral pursuit ==
As well as military and ROC use of aircraft recognition, the civilian population in Great Britain, in particular, have also used aircraft recognition for entertainment. Competitions have been run, notably by Air-Britain, for all-comers to take part in, where images of aircraft are displayed for a limited amount of time for competitors to identify, with a short time limit between images and no repeat showings. Competitors have ranged from civilians, Air Training Corps, ROC and military personnel.

== See also ==
- Identification friend or foe
- Roundel
