= Soda Springs, Idaho =

City in the United States

- City
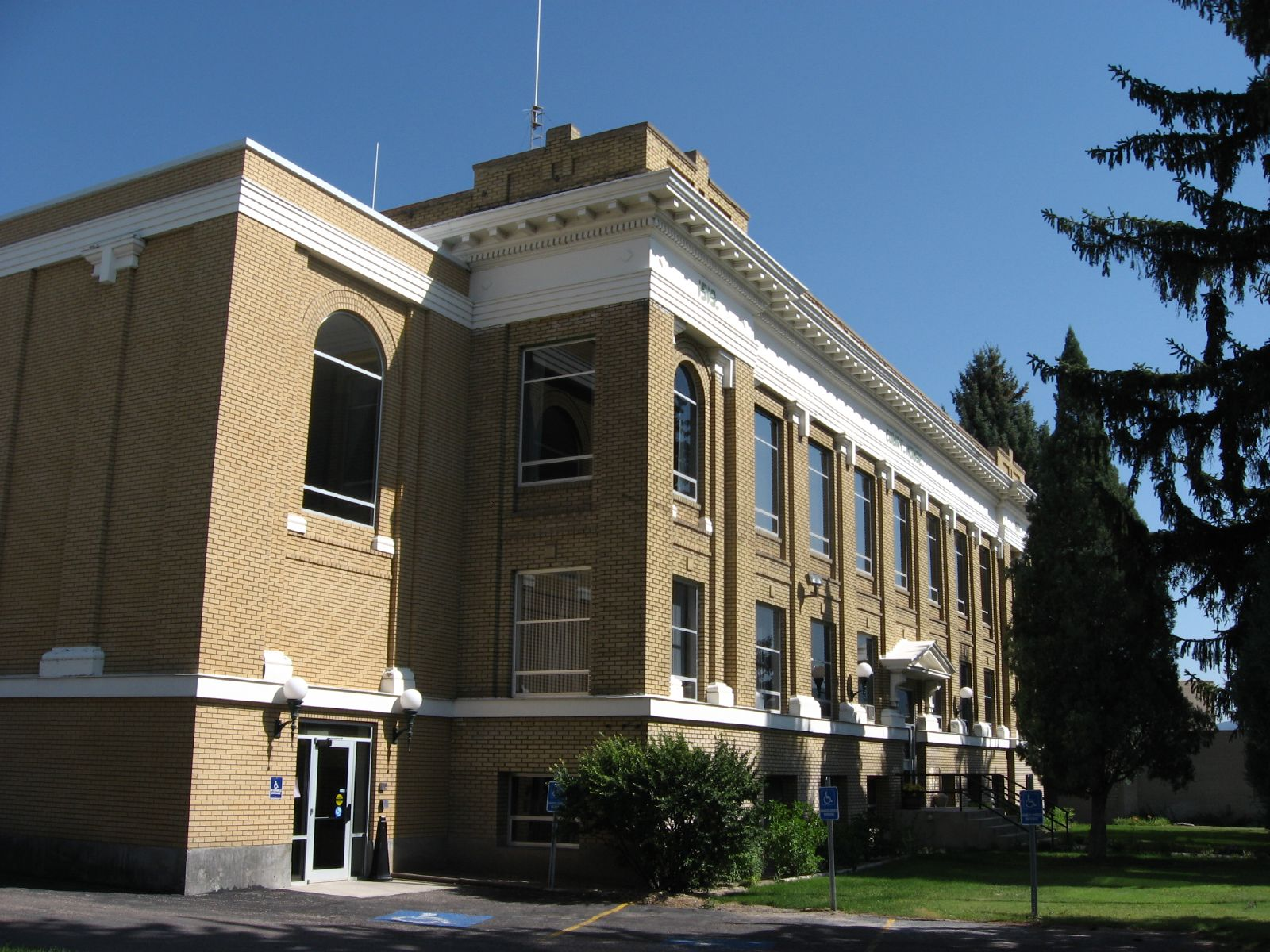
- Caribou County Courthouse
- Motto: "Historic Oregon Trail Oasis"
- Location of Soda Springs in Caribou County, Idaho

- Location in the United States
- Coordinates: 42°39′32″N 111°35′16″W
- Country: United States
- State: Idaho
- County: Caribou

Area
  - Total: 4.47 sq mi (11.58 km^{2})
  - Land: 4.43 sq mi (11.47 km^{2})
  - Water: 0.046 sq mi (0.12 km^{2})
- Elevation: 5,811 ft (1,771 m)

Population (2020)
  - Total: 3,133
  - Density: 707.5/sq mi (273.15/km^{2})
- Time zone: UTC-7 (Mountain (MST))
  - Summer (DST): UTC-6 (MDT)
- ZIP codes: 83230, 83276, 83285
- Area code: 208
- FIPS code: 16-75195
- GNIS feature ID: 2411921
- Website: www.sodaspringsid.com

Soda Springs is a city in Caribou County, Idaho, United States. Its population was 3,133 at the time of the 2020 census. The city has been the county seat of Caribou County since the county was organized in 1919. In the 1860s, Soda Springs served as the seat of Oneida County.

== History ==
The city is named for the hundreds of natural springs of carbonated water that are located in and around the city. The springs were known to Native Americans and were a landmark along the Oregon Trail in the mid-19th century. The city is also the location of the Soda Springs Geyser, which was unleashed in 1937 when town fathers were seeking hot water for a hot pool bathing attraction. They drilled into a chamber of highly pressurized carbon dioxide gas and cold water, and the geyser erupted. After running for weeks and flooding the downtown area, it was capped and then manually released, at first upon request, as a tourist attraction. More recently, a timed release valve opens every hour on the hour. The geyser's height and volume have not decreased in the decades since. Viewing platforms are located at either end of the travertine mound where the geyser erupts. Interpretive signs are located on the platforms explaining the phenomenon.

Soda Springs is also the location of one of the Ground Observer Corps sites.

== Geography ==
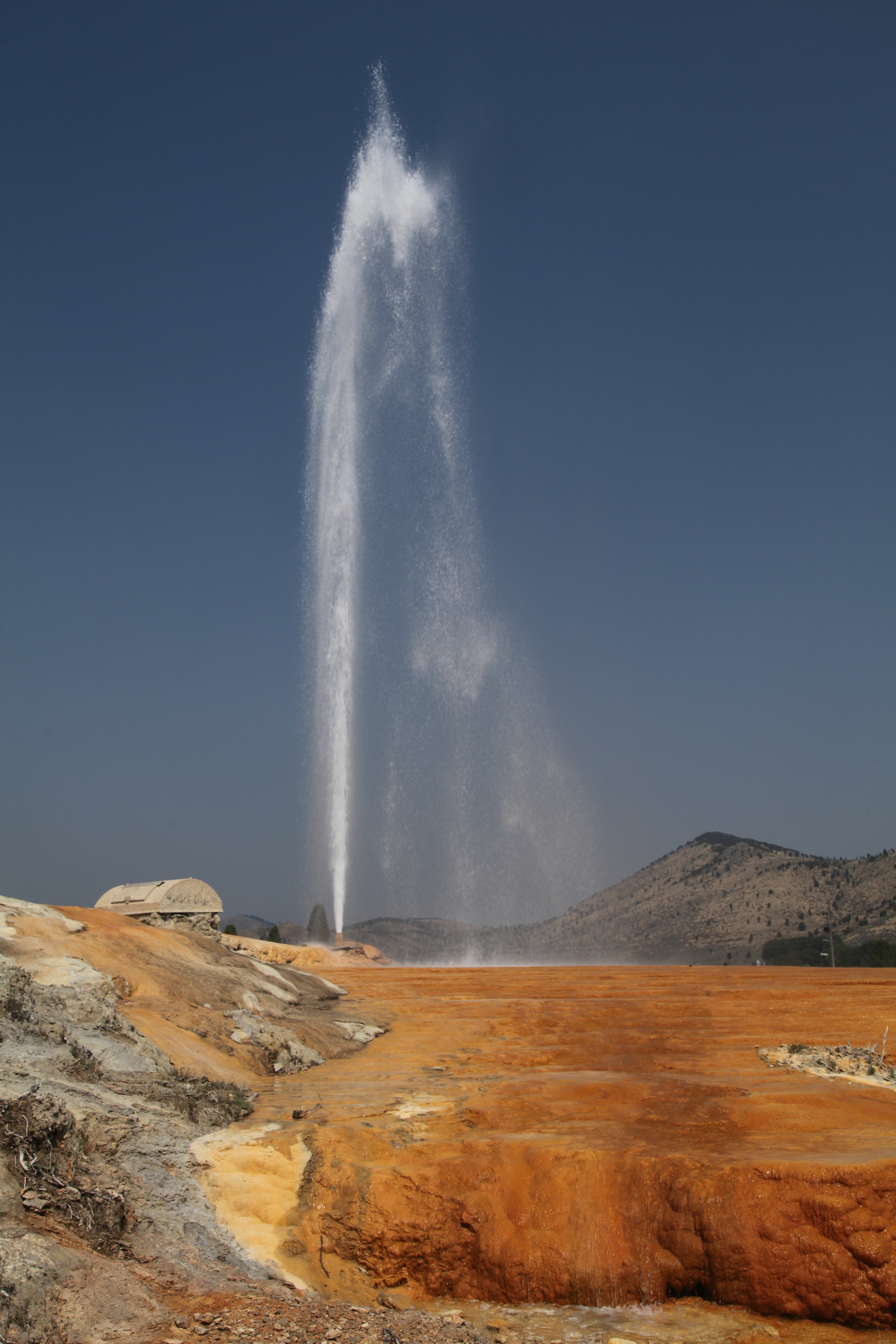
Eruption-controlled geyser in Soda Springs

According to the United States Census Bureau, the city has a total area of 4.59 square miles (11.89 km^{2}), of which 0.05 sq mi (0.13 km^{2}) is covered by water.

Soda Springs experiences a continental climate (Köppen: Dfb) with long, cold, snowy winters and cool summers.

Climate data for Soda Springs Airport
| Month | Jan | Feb | Mar | Apr | May | Jun | Jul | Aug | Sep | Oct | Nov | Dec | Year |
|---|---|---|---|---|---|---|---|---|---|---|---|---|---|
| Record high °F (°C) | 58 (14) | 56 (13) | 69 (21) | 80 (27) | 89 (32) | 97 (36) | 101 (38) | 98 (37) | 92 (33) | 85 (29) | 67 (19) | 57 (14) | 101 (38) |
| Mean daily maximum °F (°C) | 28.6 (−1.9) | 32.2 (0.1) | 40.5 (4.7) | 52.3 (11.3) | 63.0 (17.2) | 73.9 (23.3) | 83.2 (28.4) | 81.8 (27.7) | 71.3 (21.8) | 58.1 (14.5) | 40.6 (4.8) | 30.2 (−1.0) | 54.6 (12.6) |
| Mean daily minimum °F (°C) | 8.1 (−13.3) | 10.9 (−11.7) | 18.9 (−7.3) | 26.6 (−3.0) | 34.5 (1.4) | 40.7 (4.8) | 45.2 (7.3) | 44.1 (6.7) | 35.3 (1.8) | 26.3 (−3.2) | 18.3 (−7.6) | 8.1 (−13.3) | 26.4 (−3.1) |
| Record low °F (°C) | −37 (−38) | −32 (−36) | −19 (−28) | −2 (−19) | 17 (−8) | 10 (−12) | 26 (−3) | 19 (−7) | 12 (−11) | 6 (−14) | −25 (−32) | −37 (−38) | −37 (−38) |
| Average precipitation inches (mm) | 1.14 (29) | 1.27 (32) | 1.42 (36) | 1.35 (34) | 2.13 (54) | 1.36 (35) | 1.25 (32) | 1.31 (33) | 1.07 (27) | 1.26 (32) | 1.16 (29) | 1.03 (26) | 15.75 (399) |
Source 1: NOAA (normals, 1971–2000)
Source 2: The Weather Channel (Records)

== Demographics ==
Historical population
| Census | Pop. | Note | %± |
|---|---|---|---|
| 1900 | 428 | | — |
| 1910 | 501 | | 17.1% |
| 1920 | 935 | | 86.6% |
| 1930 | 831 | | −11.1% |
| 1940 | 1,087 | | 30.8% |
| 1950 | 1,329 | | 22.3% |
| 1960 | 2,424 | | 82.4% |
| 1970 | 2,977 | | 22.8% |
| 1980 | 4,051 | | 36.1% |
| 1990 | 3,111 | | −23.2% |
| 2000 | 3,381 | | 8.7% |
| 2010 | 3,058 | | −9.6% |
| 2020 | 3,133 | | 2.5% |
U.S. Decennial Census

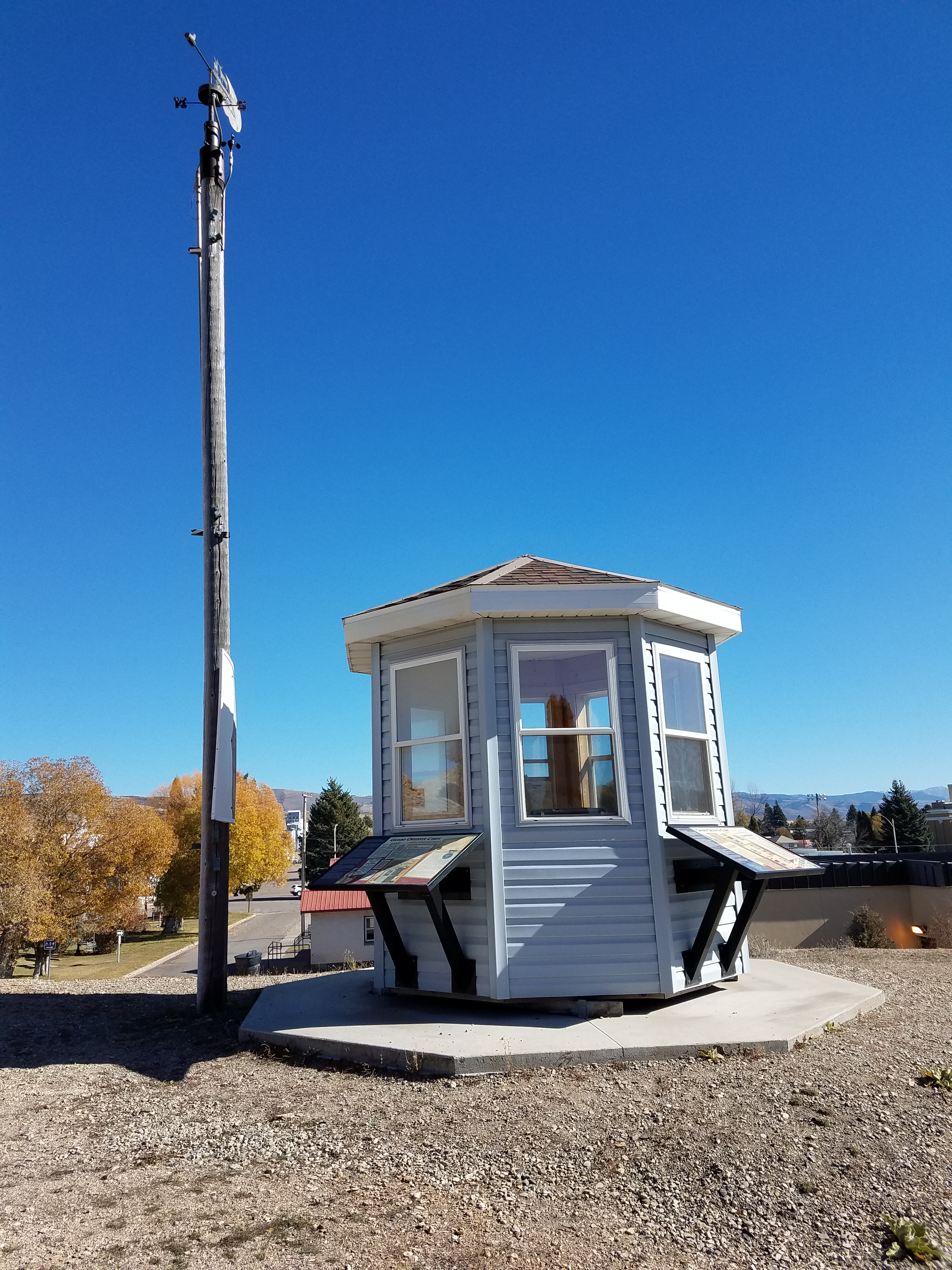
Soda Springs Ground Observer Corps booth

=== 2020 census ===
As of the 2020 census, Soda Springs had a population of 3,133. The median age was 36.6 years; 28.2% of the residents were under 18 and 16.9% were 65 or older. For every 100 females, there were 97.8 males, and for every 100 females 18 and over, there were 98.3 males 18 and over.

None of the residents lived in urban areas, while 100.0% lived in rural areas.

Of the 1,237 households in Soda Springs, 34.2% had children under 18 living in them, 49.6% were married-couple households, 20.7% were households with a male householder and no spouse or partner present, and 24.7% were households with a female householder and no spouse or partner present. About 30.0% of all households were made up of individuals, and 13.0% had someone living alone who was 65 age or older.

The city had 1,357 housing units, of which 8.8% were vacant. The homeowner vacancy rate was 1.6% and the rental vacancy rate was 11.1%.

Racial composition as of the 2020 census
| Race | Number | Percentage |
|---|---|---|
| White | 2,885 | 92.1% |
| Black or African American | 1 | 0.0% |
| American Indian and Alaska Native | 31 | 1.0% |
| Asian | 5 | 0.2% |
| Native Hawaiian and other Pacific Islander | 7 | 0.2% |
| Some other race | 49 | 1.6% |
| Two or more races | 155 | 4.9% |
| Hispanic or Latino (of any race) | 172 | 5.5% |

=== 2010 census ===
As of the 2010 census, 3,058 people, 1,204 households, and 830 families were living in the city. The population density was 673.6 inhabitants per square mile (260.1/km^{2}). The 1,393 housing units had an average density of 306.8 per square mile (118.5/km^{2}). The racial makeup of the city was 96.4% White, 0.1% African American, 0.3% Native American, 0.3% Asian, 0.4% Pacific Islander, 1.4% from other races, and 1.2% from two or more races. Hispanics or Latino people of any race were 3.4% of the population.

Of the 1,204 households, 33.4% had children under 18 living with them, 56.9% were married couples living together, 8.4% had a female householder with no husband present, 3.7% had a male householder with no wife present, and 31.1% were not families. About 28.2% of all households were made up of individuals, and 12.5% had someone living alone who was 65 or older. The average household size was 2.47, and the average family size was 3.03.

The median age in the city was 37.8 years; the age distribution was 27.4% under 18, 7.1% from 18 to 24, 22.9% were from 25 to 44, 26.2% were from 45 to 64, and 16.4% were 65 or older. The gender makeup of the city was 49.7% male and 50.3% female.

=== 2000 census ===
As of the 2000 census, 3,381 people, 1,210 households, and 905 families resided in the city. The population density was 747.1 inhabitants per square mile (288.5/km^{2}). The 1,505 housing units had an average density of 332.6 per square mile (128.4/km^{2}). The racial makeup of the city was 96.63% White, 0.03% African American, 0.09% Native American, 0.15% Asian, 0.21% Pacific Islander, 1.18% from other races, and 1.72% from two or more races. Hispanic or Latino people of any race were 2.90% of the population.

Of the 1,210 households, 40.7% had children under 18 living with them, 66.1% were married couples living together, 6.5% had a female householder with no husband present, and 25.2% were not families; 22.1% of all households were made up of individuals, and 9.3% had someone living alone who was 65 or older. The average household size was 2.74 and the average family size was 3.24.

In the city, the age distribution was 30.8% under 18, 9.5% from 18 to 24, 26.0% from 25 to 44, 20.1% from 45 to 64, and 13.5% were 65 or older. The median age was 34 years. For every 100 females, there were 95.2 males. For every 100 females 18 and over, there were 97.3 males.

The median income in the city for a household was $40,690 and for a family was $46,152. Males had a median income of $41,979 versus $21,250 for females. The per capita income for the city was $15,729. About 7.0% of families and 9.3% of the population were below the poverty line, including 8.5% of those under 18 and 8.7% of those 65 or over.

== See also ==
- Crystal Geyser
