= List of windmills in North Yorkshire =

This is a list of windmills in the English county of North Yorkshire.

== York ==
Location	Name of mill and grid reference	Type	Maps	First mention or built	Last mention or demise	Photograph
York	Clifton Mill; Lady Mill			1374	1444	
York	Clifton Mill; Lady Mill		1772	1721	1772	
York	Clifton Mill; Lady Mill			1817	1852	
York	Haxby Road Mill; SE 606 533	Tower			Windmill World	
York	Pepper Mill			1575	1575	
York	Bootham Stray Mill; White Cross Mill	Post	1772	1772	Demolished c. 1840	
York	Junction of Glen Road and Harcourt Street			1852	1852	
York	Holgate Mill			1366	1433	
York	Holgate Mill; SE 584 515	Tower			Windmill World	
York	The Mount			13th century	13th century	
York	Mount Mills			1852	1852	
York	York Field				Demolished c. 1620	
York	York Field	post		1620	1831	
York	York Field	Smock		1783	1825	
York	Clementhorpe			Early 16th century	1620	
York	Clementhorpe, Nun Mill		1772	1689	Demolished c. 1885	
York	Clementhorpe (2nd mill)			Early 16th century	Gone by 1546	
York	Paynlathes Croft					
York	Between Clifton Road and the River Ouse			14th century	Early 18th century	
York	Fulford Field Mill; Lammel Mill			1767	1836	
York	Lendal Tower, York Waterworks			1677	1677	
York	Heworth Moor Mill			1569	1569	
York	Monkgate				Demolished c. 1745	

== Other locations ==
Location	Name of mill and grid reference	Type	Maps	First mention or built	Last mention or demise	Photograph
Acklam				1582	1613	
Ainderby Steeple				1359	1359	
Aldborough		Post		1814		
Aldborough		Tower				
Alne				1575	1575	
Appleton Roebuck	Appleton Roebuck Mill; SE 544 425	Tower		Early 19th century	Windmill World	
Askham Richard	Askham Richard Mill; SE 542 472	Tower			Windmill World	
Barlby		Post				
Barlby		Tower				
Bossall				1830	1830	
Brompton	Brompton Mill; SE 378 968	Tower			Standing in 1914; Windmill World	
Cayton	Cayton Cliff Mill			1661	1661	
Claxton	Claxton Mill; SE 691 596	Tower			Windmill World	
Claxton	Brickworks	tower				
Coatham	Station Road Mill	Tower		1805	Standing during World War I, gone by 1932.	
Church Fenton						
Cundall	Staynhill			1341	1341	
Danby Wiske				1285	1285	
Dromonby				1583	1671	
Dunnington				1295	1295	
Earswick				1323	1323	
Elvington	Elvington Windpump; SE 683 470	Tower			Windmill World	
Escrick				1290	1290	
Farlington				1588	1588	
Filey	Muston Mill; TA 107 799	Tower			Windmill World	
Flaxton				1590	1590	
Follifoot	Follifoot mill SE 325 521	Tower			Windmill World	
Fylingdales	Peak Mill				Standing in 1923	
Guisborough				1540	1540	
Hawsker	Low Hawsker Mill; NZ 922 076	Tower			Standing in 1923	
Helperthorpe		Sunk post				
Heslington	Stublowe Myln			1530	1530	
Heslington	Heslington Mill	Post				
Heslington	Heslington Mill	Tower				
Holtby				1571	1616	
Hornby	Hornby Mill; NZ 360 054	Tower			Windmill World	
Hemlington				1352	1352	
Huddleston	Huddleston Mill; SE 473 336	Tower			Windmill World	
Hunmanby				1298	1298	
Hunmanby				1732	1732	
Huntington				1322	1460	
Kellington	Kellington Windmill; SE 545 242				1923	
Kirk Leavington				1262	1315	
Kirkbymoorside	Kirkbymoorside Mill; SE 696 864	Tower			Windmill World	
Kirkleatham				1340		
Little Smeaton	Little Smeaton Mill	post			Demolished August 1961	
Low Hawsker	Low Hawsker Mill				Standing in 1923	
Malton	Old Malton Mill; SE 793 740	Tower			Windmill World	
Marske				1349	1560	
Marske	West Field			13th century	c. 1541	
Marske	West Field			1609	1609	
Marton				14th century	14th century	
Marton				16th century	1609	
Marton				c. 1834	c. 1865	
Muston	Muston Mill; TA 107 799	Tower			Truncated	
Northallerton	Northallerton Junction				Standing in 1914	
Ormesby				12th century?		
Overton				1629	1664	
Pateley Bridge	Pateley Bridge Mill; SE 166 658	Tower			Windmill World	
Pickering		Tower		1841	1841	
Picton				1566	1657	
Ravenscar	Beacon Windmill; NZ 976 007	Tower			Windmill World	
Redcar	Redcar Windmill; NZ 609 250	Tower		1836	Standing in 1859.	
Riccall				1295	1295	
Riccall	Riccall Mill; SE 617 374	Tower			Windmill World	
Rillington		Sunk post				
Romanby				1663	1663	
Sand Hutton	The Moor			1604	1604	
Scarborough				1340	1240	
Scarborough				1641	1641, demolished by 1651	
Scarborough	Victoria Mill; TA 036 884	Tower			Windmill World	
Sillington				1295	1295	
Sitlington	Sandy Lane Mill; SE 277 175	Tower			Windmill World	
Skelton-on-Ure	Kirby Mill; SE 375 696	Tower			Windmill World	
Skirlaugh	Swine Priory			1560s	1611	
South Duffield	South Duffield Mill; SE 677 335	Tower			Windmill World	
Snainton	Foulbridge			1273	1307	
Stainton				1591	1591	
Stillington				1244	1244	
Stittenham				1633	1808	
Stutton	Stutton Mill; SE 476 421	Tower			Windmill World	
Thornaby-on-Tees				1575	1625	
Thornton-le-Clay	Thornton Mill; SE 677 657	Tower			Windmill World	
Tollerton	Tollerton mill SE 514 638	Tower			Windmill World	
Ugthorpe	Ugthorpe Mill; NZ 791 115	Tower			Windmill World	
Ulleskelf	Ulleskelf Mill; SE 519 390	Tower			Windmill World	
West Coatham				1367	1367	
Warrenby	Marsh House Farm				Destroyed by fire, 1815.	
West Rounton				17th century	17th century	
Whitby	East Cliff			1540	1540	
Whitby	Union Mill; Co-operative Mill; NZ 894 111	Tower		1806	Demolished c. 1923; Windmill World	
Whitby	Wren's Mill				Demolished 1862	
Whitby	Newholm Mill	Tower				
Yapham	Yapham Mill; SE 790 505	Tower		1805	Windmill World	
Yarm				1272	1354	
Yarm				1608	1614	
Yarm					Standing in 1923	

== Maps ==
- 1772 T Jeffereys
- 1775 Jackson
- 1829 A Bryant
- 1855 Ordnance Survey

== Notes ==
Mills in bold are still standing, known building dates are indicated in bold. Text in italics denotes indicates that the information is not confirmed, but is likely to be the case stated.

== Sources ==
Unless otherwise indicated, the source for all entries is:-Gregory, Roy (1985). East Yorkshire Windmills. Cheddar: Charles Skilton Ltd. ISBN 0-284-98721-2. or the linked Windmill World page.
