= Stutton =

Stutton can refer to:

- Stutton, North Yorkshire
- Stutton, Suffolk
