= Holgate, York =

Suburb of York, North Yorkshire, England

Coordinates: 53°57′28″N 1°06′41″W

Holgate
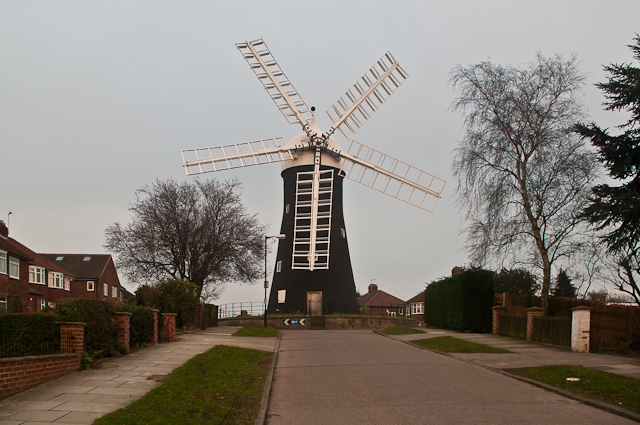
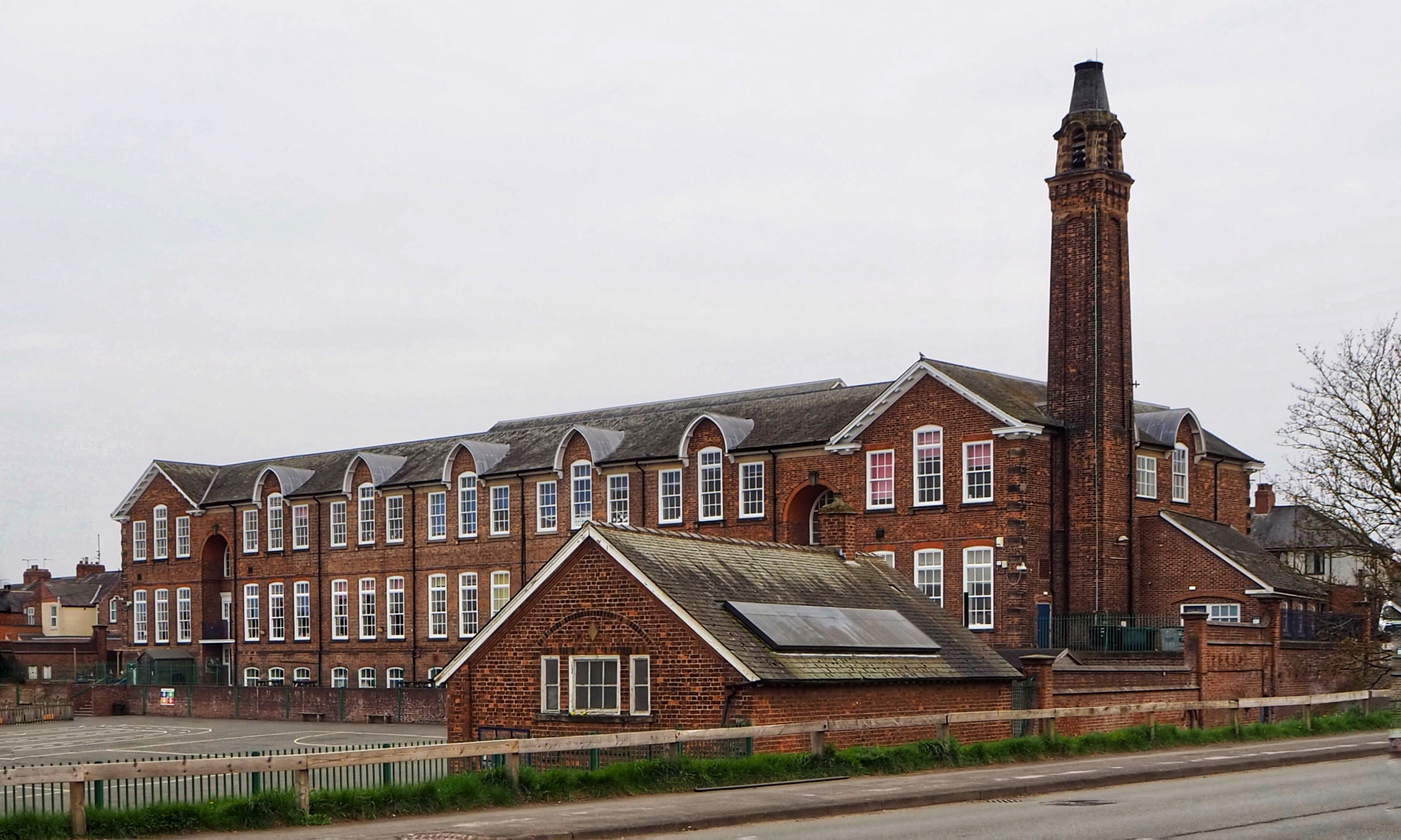
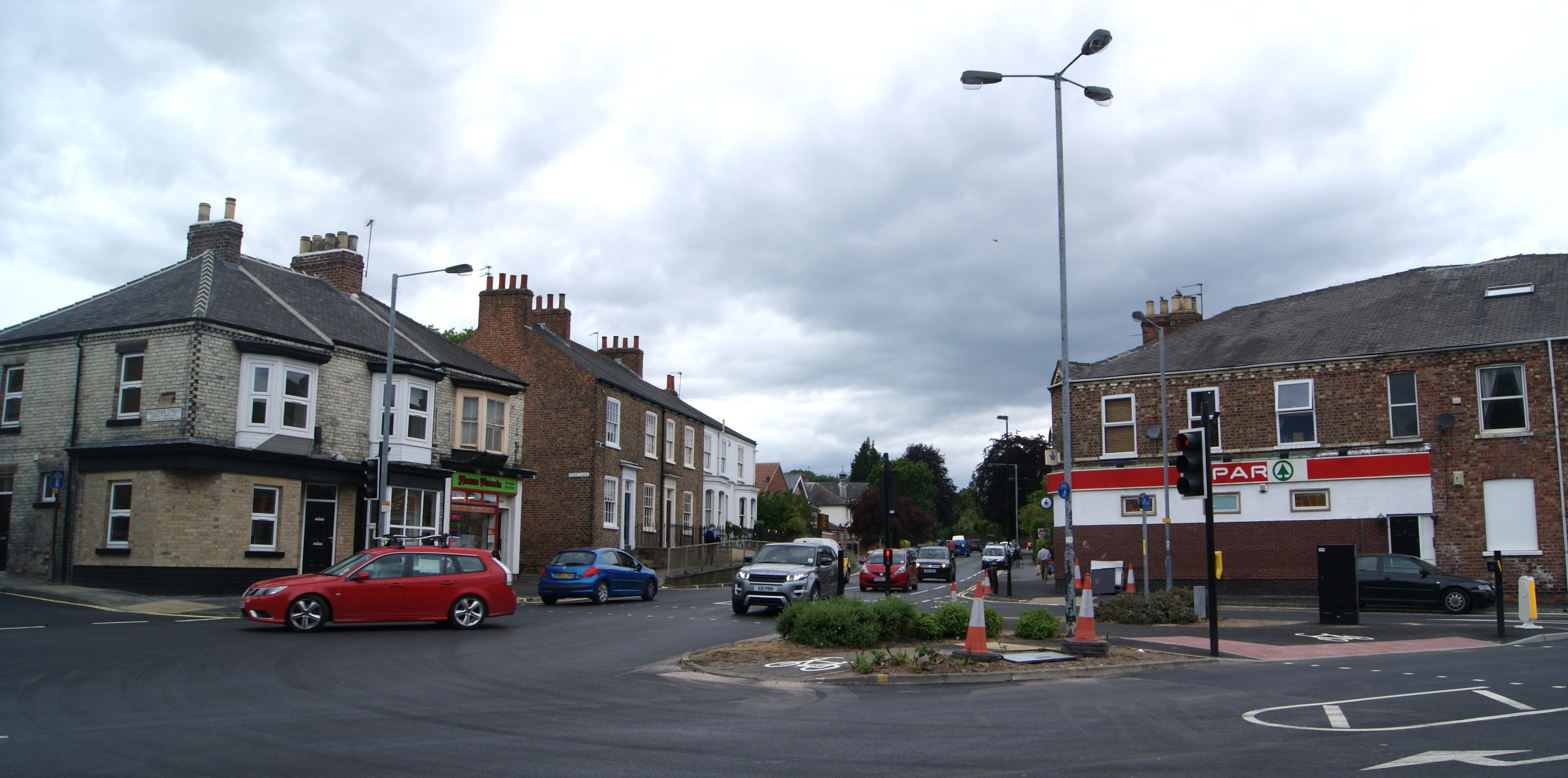
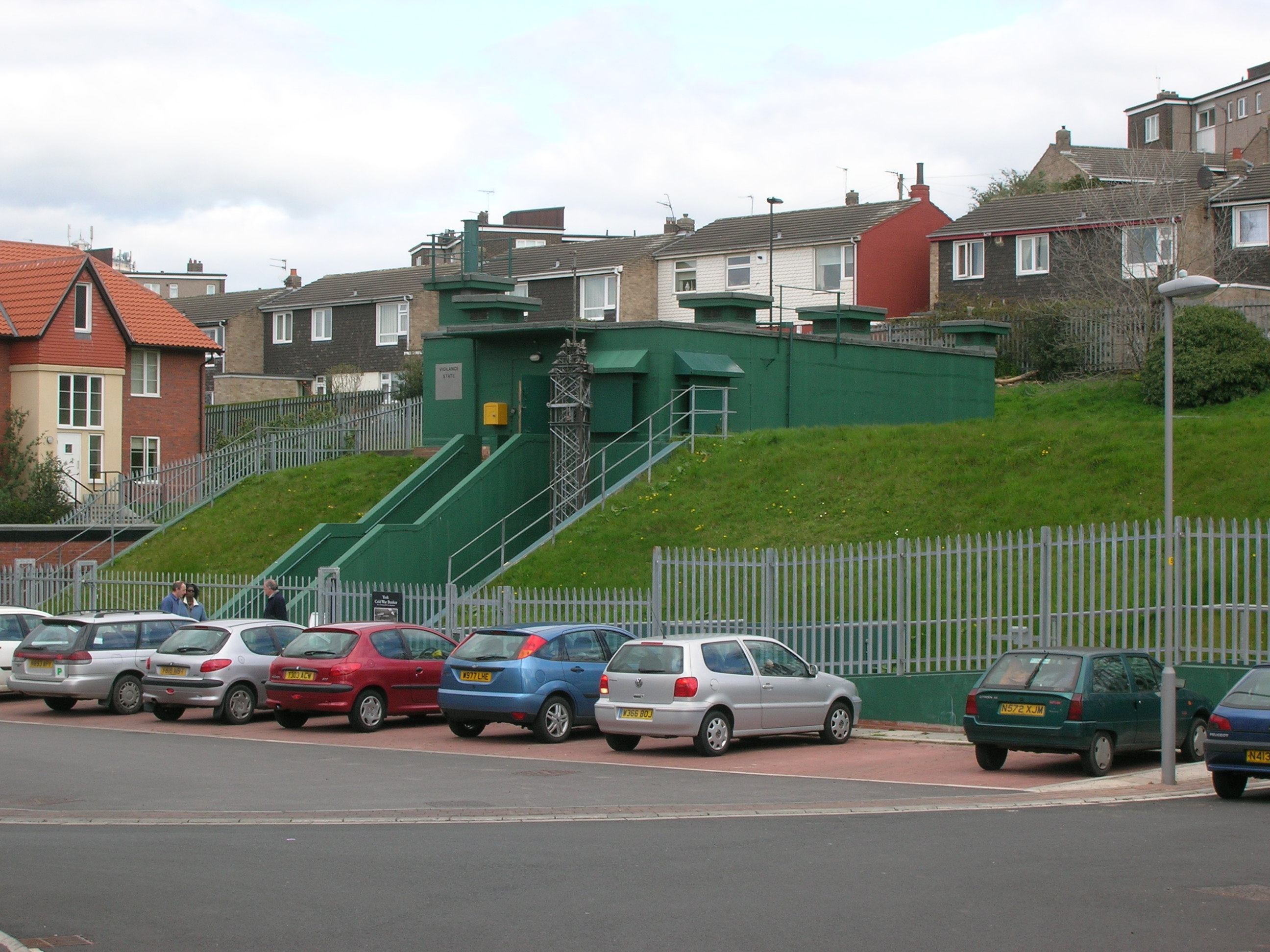
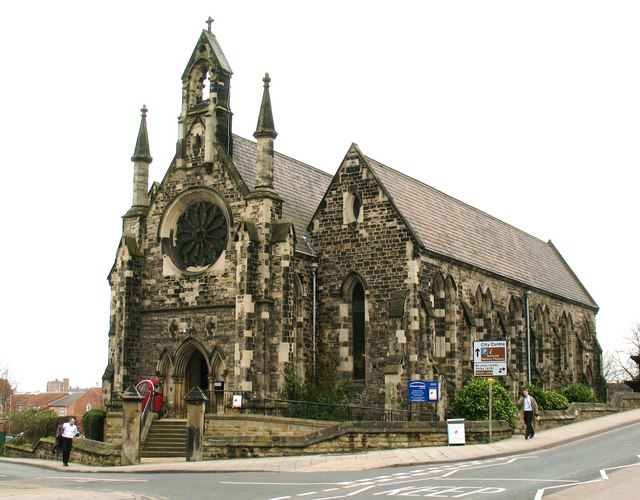
- Holgate Windmill Poppleton Road School A59 & B1224 Junction York Cold War Bunker St Paul’s Church

- Location within North Yorkshire
- Population: 12,832 (ward. 2011 census)
- OS grid reference: SE585515
- Unitary authority: City of York
- Ceremonial county: North Yorkshire
- Region: Yorkshire and the Humber
- Country: England
- Sovereign state: United Kingdom
- Post town: YORK
- Postcode district: YO23, YO24, YO26
- Dialling code: 01904
- Police: North Yorkshire
- Fire: North Yorkshire
- Ambulance: Yorkshire
- UK Parliament: York Central

Holgate is a suburb of York in the ceremonial county of North Yorkshire, England. It is located about 1 mile west of Micklegate Bar in the city walls. Holgate is also the name of an electoral ward in the City of York unitary authority. The ward is currently bounded by the River Ouse from Scarborough Bridge to Ouse Acres on its northern boundary. Carr Lane and Ouse Acres on one side, and the intersection of York Road and Acomb Road on the other, make up its western boundary. The remainder of the southern boundary follows Moorgate and Holgate Beck to the East Coast Main Line railway which completes the eastern boundary as far as the River Ouse/Scarborough Bridge.

The ward contains the National Railway Museum and many historic buildings, including a restored 18th century windmill and a Cold War bunker. It is the site of the former York Carriage Works which closed in 1996. Thrall Car Manufacturing Company, briefly re-opened the works. After that closed in 2002 Network Rail continue to use it as a maintenance depot.

== History ==
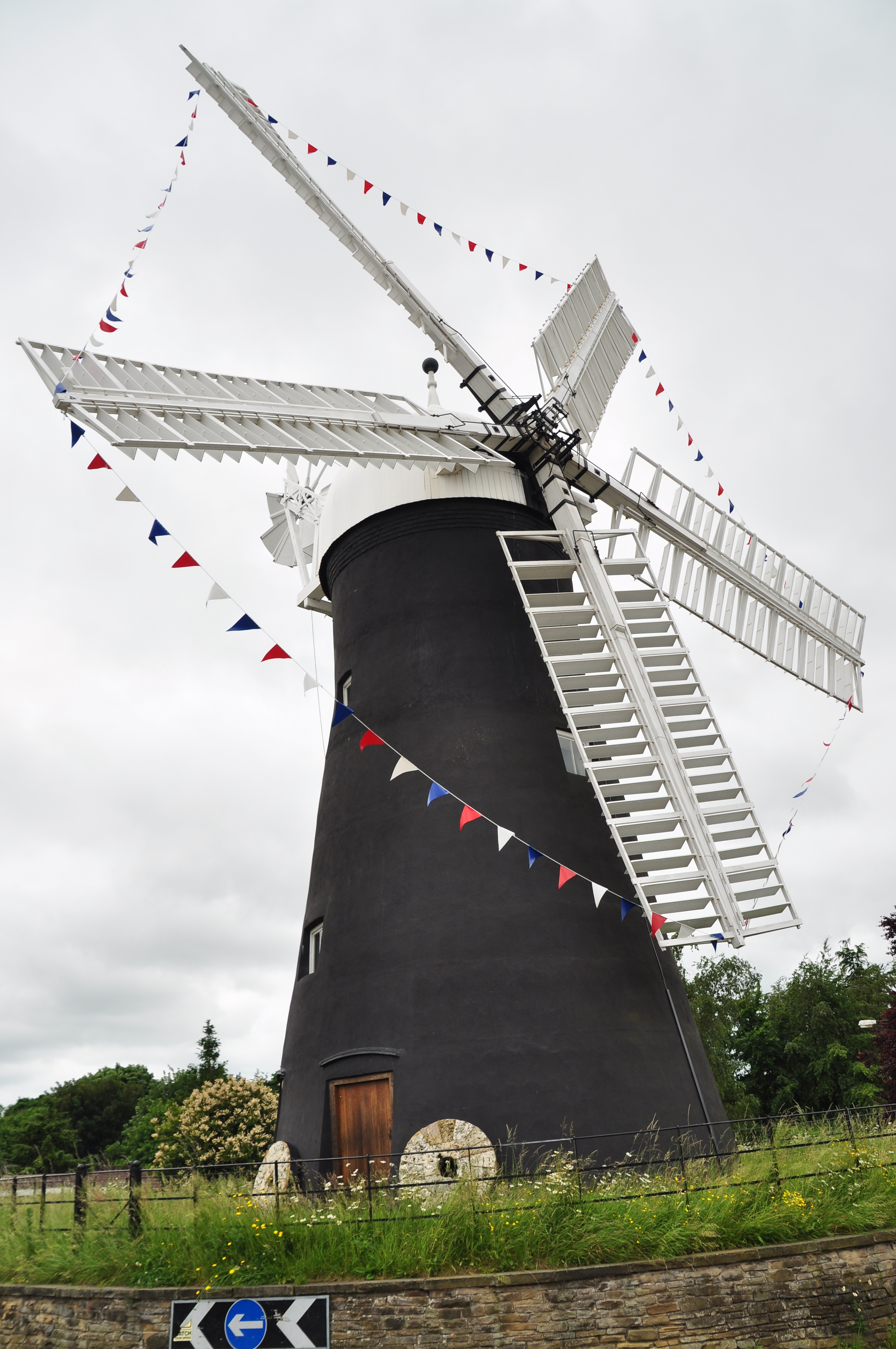
Holgate Windmill in 2014

Holgate is mentioned in chronicles as far back as the 14th century. There are many historic buildings within its boundaries, including a restored windmill. The Holgate Windmill sits on Windmill Rise. The current windmill, built in 1770 by George Waud, ceased grinding corn in 1933 and fell into disuse. It has since undergone restoration work overseen by the Holgate windmill Association. There is also mention of a Hob Moor Water Mill located on Holgate Beck, reportedly demolished or fallen in disrepair by 1723.

The York New Waterworks Company, formed in 1846, built their new works at Acomb Landing, just off Boroughbridge Road. It supplied the city of York, Holgate and other nearby areas and although the site has since expanded, it still serves the area as the York Waterworks Company.

In 1843, it was recorded that the population of Holgate was a mere 143. The population of Holgate increased with the building of the Carriageworks in the late 19th century.

Holgate was formerly a township of the parish of St. Mary - Bishophill Junior being a part of the manor of Acomb in the Ainsty of York. It became a separate civil parish in 1866, but the civil parish was abolished on 26 March 1900 and merged with York. In 1891 the parish had a population of 1073. The city boundary of York was expanded by local legislation, in 1884, to include Holgate. Until 1974 it was in the North Riding of Yorkshire.

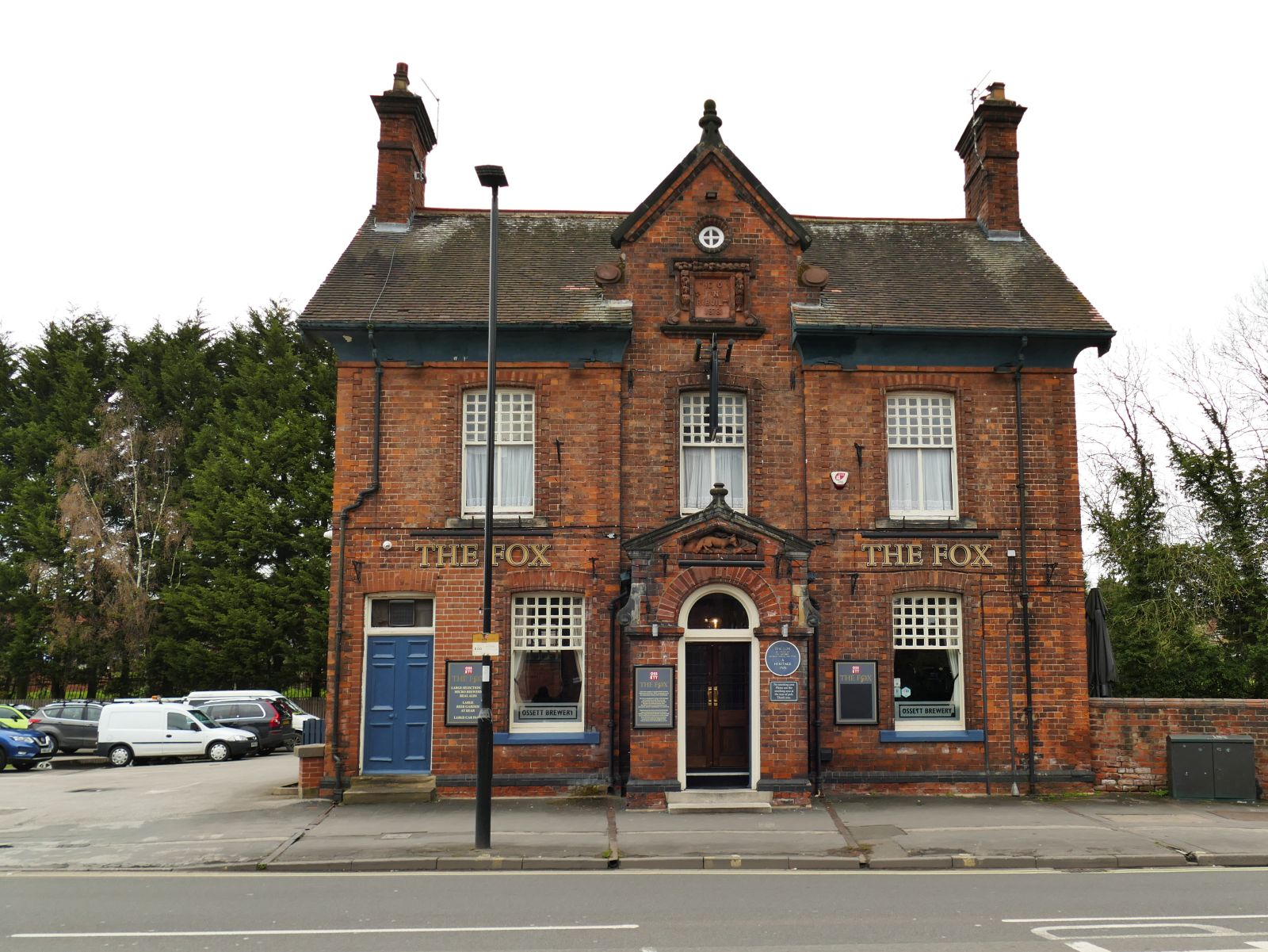
The Fox

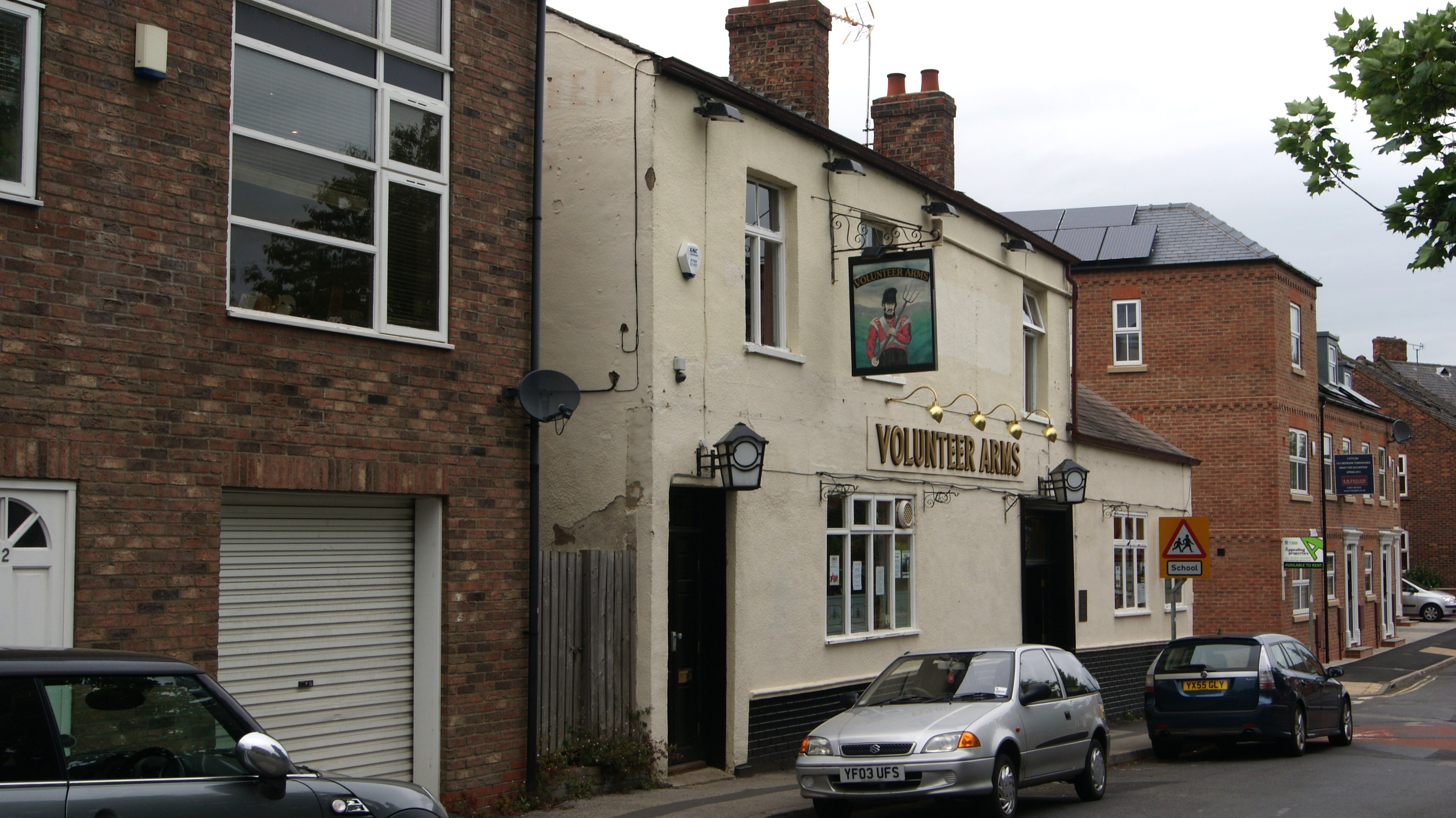
Volunteer Arms

The Fox pub lies on Holgate Road; it was purpose-built in 1878. Other notable buildings include Holgate House, built in 1774.

Holgate was home to No. 20 Group Royal Observer Corps located in a semi-subterranean bunker built in 1961. It was in use until 1991 and situated behind the Government Building of Shelley House, which has now been redeveloped into residential properties. It has been preserved as a museum by English Heritage working with the York ROC Association and the Cold War Bunker Trust, having been granted scheduled monument status in 2000.

The antiquarian Francis Drake also claims that Roman Emperor Septimius Severus was cremated within Holgate on of a hill known as 'Severus Hill'. In one of his texts Drake wrote "But Severus being flain (slain) by the Pitts at York, was buried in a hill called from him, Severus Hill.". The only archaeological evidence to support this are the remains of Roman roads on the hill. Greek historian Cassius Dio details the cremation of Severus, but never named a location.

== Politics ==
Holgate Ward returns three councillors to the City of York Council. Following the 2023 local elections these are Jenny Kent, Lucy Steels-Walshaw, and Kallum Taylor, all of whom represent the local Labour Party.

Holgate is situated in the UK parliamentary constituency of York Central. Its current MP is Rachael Maskell, a Labour Co-operative member.

== Demographics ==
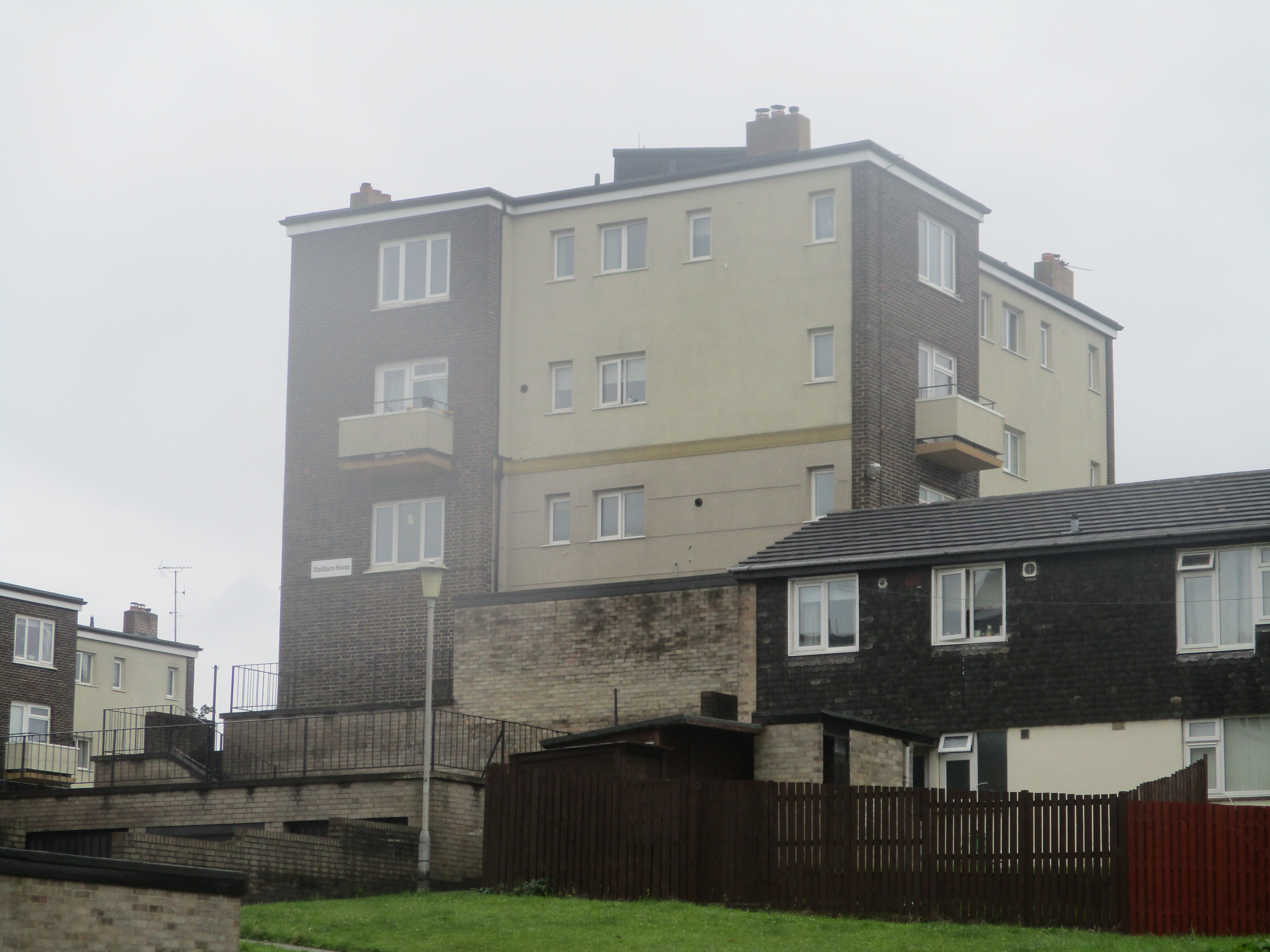
Apartment blocks in the Holgate Rise area

The figures below were taken from the Census 2001 Key Statistics for Local Authorities in England and Wales, from the Office for National Statistics on 29 April 2001.

The population in Holgate Ward was 11,564 of which 92.3% were born in England and 3.8% from outside the United Kingdom. The largest Age Group within the population, 25.1%, were between 30 and 44 years old. Of the total population, 95.9% described their ethnic origin as White-British. The figures show that 72.3% declared they were Christian, whilst 18.6% declared no religious belief at all. Of the population aged between 16 and 74 years old, 69.1% declared they were in some form of employment and 12.1% said they were retired. Of the 5,311 households, 34.6% were Semi-Detached and 47.9% were Terraced. The level of household ownership was 73.5%.

The population according to the 2011 UK Census had risen to 12,832 for the Holgate ward.

== Public services ==
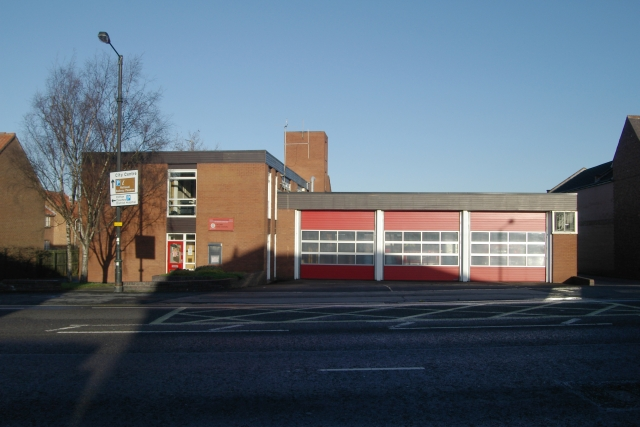
Fire Station on Boroughbridge Road

Located on Acomb Road is the Police Station for the Acomb and Holgate Team of the North Yorkshire and City of York Police Force. North Yorkshire Fire & Rescue Service operate a 24/7 shift out of the Acomb Fire Station on Boroughbridge Road.

== Geography ==
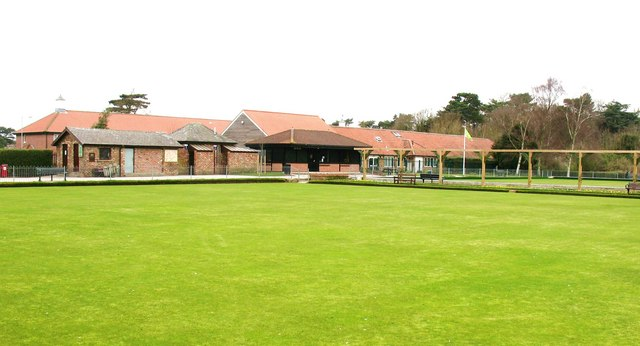
Bowling Greens at West Bank Park

The geographic area of Holgate is taken up mostly by domestic and industrial buildings with large areas of railway track. There are some open areas, one of which is West Bank Park. This is managed by the City Council and consists of 20 acres containing woodlands and an arboretum, as well as two bowling greens, a basketball court, two play areas, toilets and a refreshments building. Entrances are on Hamilton Drive and Acomb Road. The park, originally the grounds of West Bank house, was established in 1936–38 and included a statue of Queen Victoria that was originally in the Guildhall. There are six smaller play areas around the ward. There is also some open space alongside the river.

== Economy ==
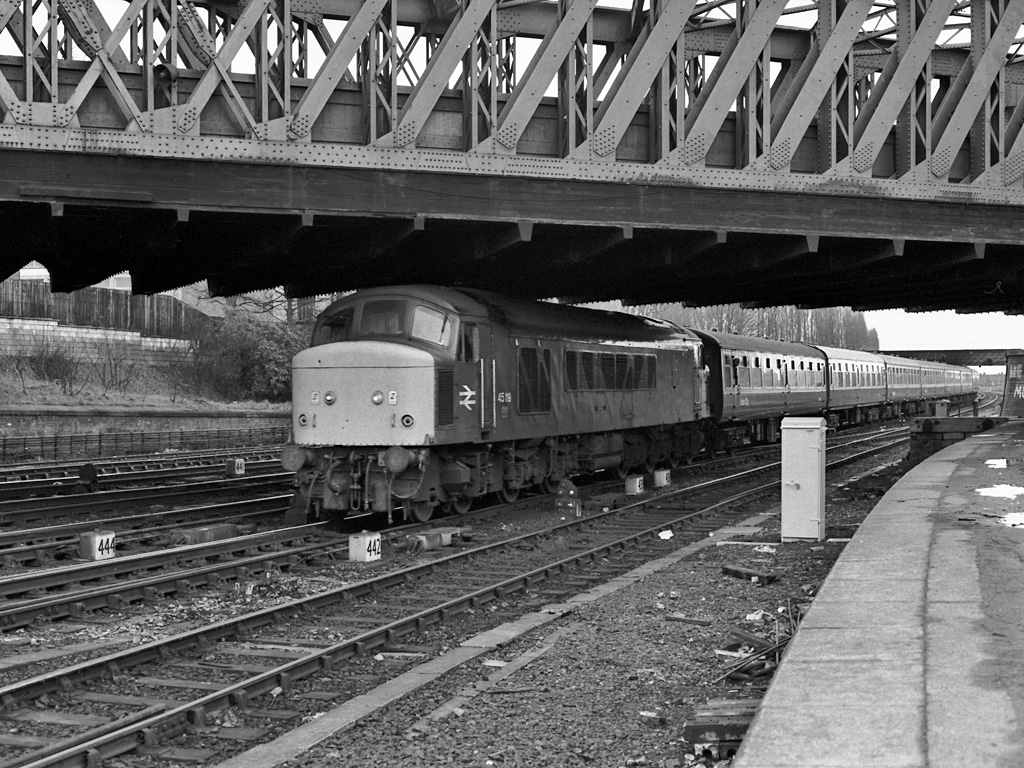
Holgate Bridge

In 1880 the North Eastern Railway decided to concentrate more on carriage building in York by constructing the York Carriage Works in Holgate. This expanded and by 1910 it covered an area of 45 acres. By 1855 the railway workforce was 1,200-strong and was calculated to be earning about £1,350 a week for the city's economy. At the beginning of the 20th century, York had around 5,500 railway employees, of which half were employed in the wagon and carriage works. The works closed in 1996. Part of the site is now office accommodation for various companies, including Benenden Health, Gear4music, and COWI A/S.

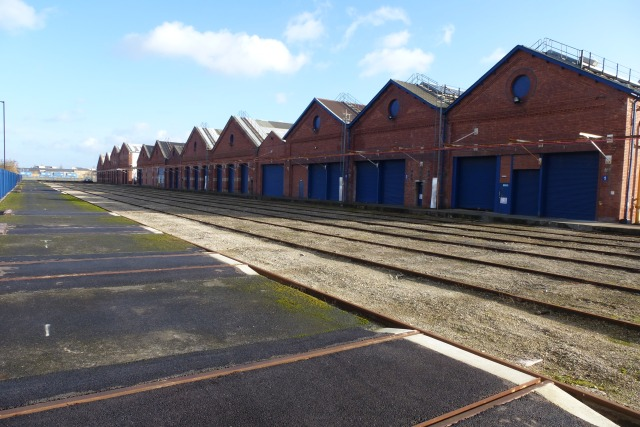
York Carriage Works

A large part of the works was retained and used by Thrall Car Manufacturing Company to build wagons for EWS. When this ceased Network Rail took over and has developed a maintenance facility, servicing amongst other things the rail head treatment trains. Separately the wagon works off Cinder Lane have been developed by Freightliner as an important maintenance depot for their mineral carrying wagons.

There are small groupings of retail shops and stores throughout the Holgate area.

== Education ==
English Martyr's Roman Catholic Voluntary Aided Primary in Hamilton Drive was originally located in Blossom Street and opened in March 1882, it was merged with Our Lady's Catholic primary school in Acomb to form Our Lady Queen of Martyrs RC Primary School, on the site of English Martyrs Primary School. Acomb Primary in West Bank was originally located on Front Street and opened in August 1894. It was one of the oldest primary schools in North Yorkshire and had been in its old buildings since 1908 and was the second largest primary school in York, with 575 pupils.

Poppleton Road Primary is located at the junction of Poppleton road and Water Lane. St Barnabas' Church of England Primary is located in Jubilee Terrace just off Leeman Road and opened in 1877. St Paul's Church of England Primary is located in St Paul's Terrace, not far from the Church of the same name and opened in 1872.

== Sports ==
York Railway Institute Football Club play their home games at New Lane. York RI have a reasonable history in non-league football as they once played in the Northern Counties East Football League. Rugby and Hockey are also catered for at the Railway Institute with this being the home ground for York Lokomotive who play in the Rugby League Conference Yorkshire Premier Division.

== Religion ==
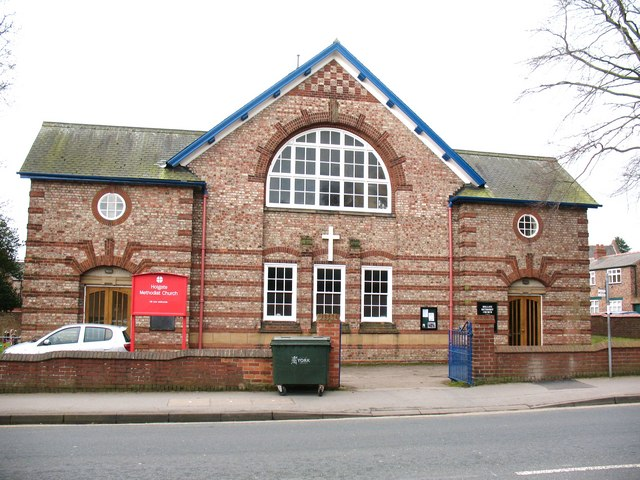
Holgate Methodist Church, Acomb Road

There are five main places of worship in Holgate. They are St Paul's Church on Holgate Road, Holgate Methodist Church on Acomb Road, St Barnabas' Church on Jubilee Terrace and the Holy Redeemer Church on Boroughbridge Road and the York congregation of the Church of Jesus Christ of Latter-day Saints (LDS Church) on Acomb Road. St Paul's Church was built in 1851 to cater to the increasing population of railway workers in the area and became the seat of its own parish in 1856. St Barnabas, built between 1902 and 1904, became its own parish in 1912, being formerly under St Paul's.

== Notable residents ==
Lindley Murray, the noted grammarian, settled in Holgate after going into exile following the American War of Independence. Holgate was the home of Moses B. Cotsworth, inventor of the International Fixed Calendar and 13-month calendar reformer. He lived in 3, Severus House, where he wrote The Rational Almanac, (1905). He later lived in Severus House before emigrating to Vancouver, British Columbia where he died in 1943.
