= St Barnabas' Church, York =

Church in York, England

St Barnabas' Church
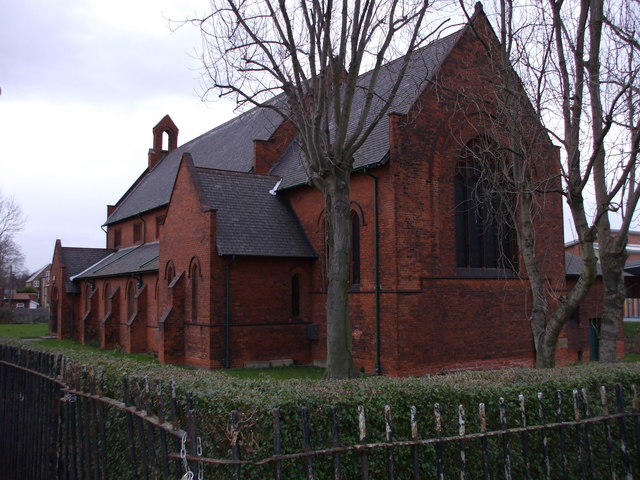
- The church, in 2011
- St Barnabas' Church
- 53.963903°N 1.103026°W
- OS grid reference: SE 58944 52355
- Location: York, North Yorkshire
- Address: Jubilee Terrace, York
- Country: England
- Denomination: Church of England

History
- Status: Active
- Dedication: Saint Barnabas
- Consecrated: 12 March 1904

Architecture
- Architect(s): Charles Hornsey and Thomas Monkman
- Style: Gothic Revival
- Groundbreaking: 1902
- Construction cost: £4,000

Specifications
- Materials: Brick

Administration
- Province: York
- Diocese: York
- Archdeaconry: York
- Deanery: York

St Barnabas' Church is a parish church in the Leeman Road area of York, a city in England.

The Leeman Road area, associated with Holgate, developed in the late 19th century as housing for railway workers. A wooden building was used for mission work from about 1877, then in 1886 a school was built and one of its rooms was used as a new mission. Work on a church for the district started in 1902, and it was consecrated on 12 March 1904. It was designed by Charles Hornsey and Thomas Monkman in the Gothic revival style, and cost about £4,000 to build. It was originally a chapel of ease to St Paul's Church, Holgate, but it was given its own parish in 1912. The original pews were made by local workers, but in 1939, St John's Church, Micklegate closed, and its pews were moved to St Barnabas. All but four of the pews were sold off in 2023, to make the church a more flexible space.

The church is built of red brick, and consists of a nave with aisles and a chancel. It has two porches at the west end, and a small bellcote.
