= Vavasour baronets, of Hazlewood (second creation, 1828) =

The Vavasour Baronetcy, of Hazlewood in the County of York, was created in the Baronetage of the United Kingdom on 14 February 1828 for Edward Vavasour. He was the third son of Charles Stourton, 17th Baron Stourton (see Baron Stourton for earlier history of the family), and the maternal cousin of the seventh and last Vavasour Baronet of the 1628 creation. He succeeded to the Vavasour estates and assumed by Royal licence the surname of Vavasour.

== Vavasour baronets, of Hazlewood (1828) ==
Second creation

- Sir Edward Marmaduke Stourton Vavasour, 1st Baronet (1786–1847)
- Sir Edward Marmaduke Vavasour, 2nd Baronet (1815–1885)
- Sir William Edward Joseph Vavasour, 3rd Baronet (1846–1915)
- Sir Leonard Pius Vavasour, 4th Baronet (1881–1961)
- Sir Geoffrey William Vavasour, 5th Baronet (1914–1997)
- Sir Eric Michel Joseph Marmaduke Vavasour, 6th Baronet (born 1953)

The heir apparent to the baronetcy is Joseph Ian Hugh Andre Vavasour (born 1978), eldest son of the 6th Baronet.
