= York Cold War Bunker =

Royal Observer Corps facility in York, England

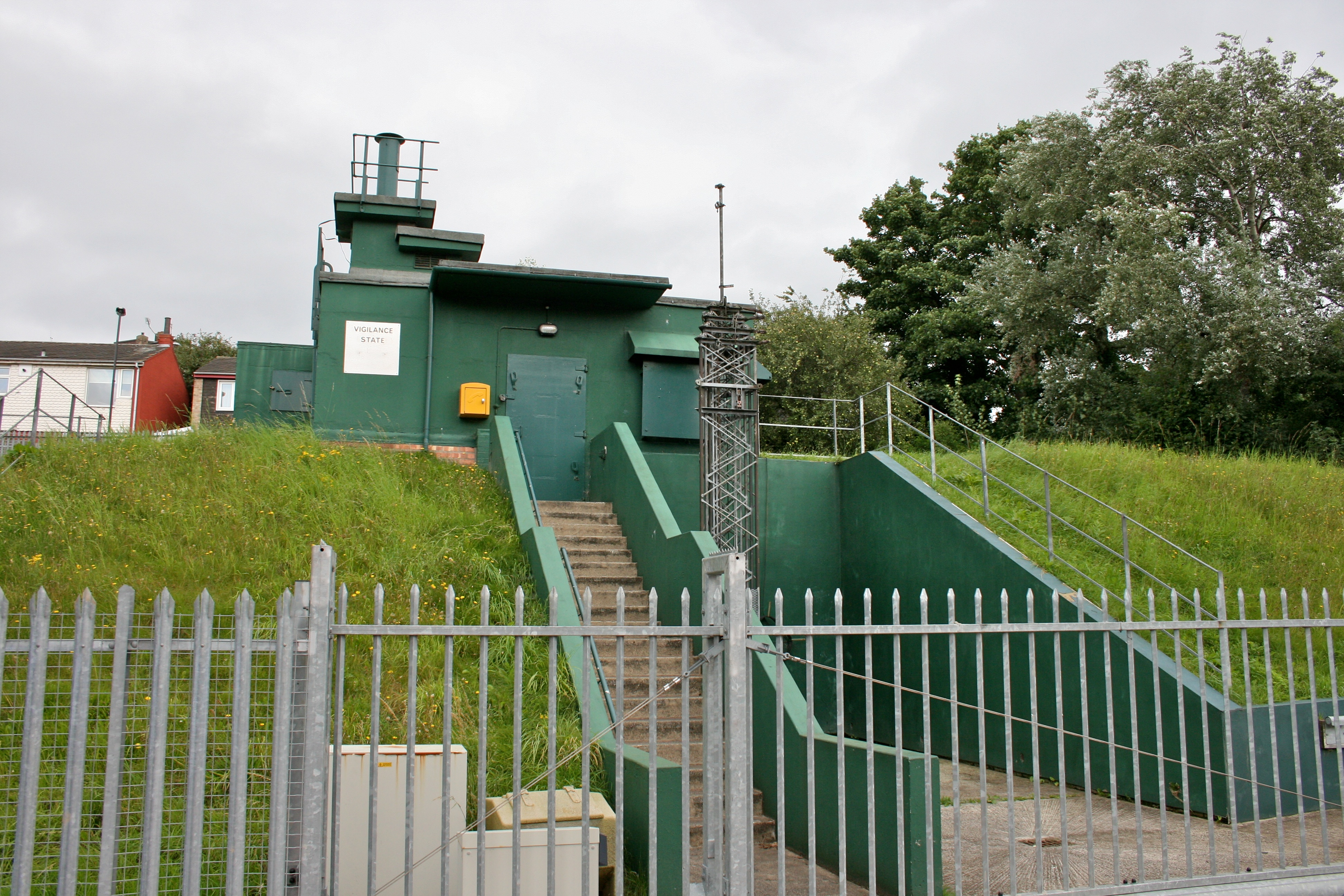

General information
- Type: Cold War bunker
- Location: Monument Close, York, England
- Coordinates: 53°57′24″N 1°07′01″W (grid reference SE5851)
- Completed: 1961
- Owner: English Heritage

Design and construction
- Designations: Scheduled Monument

York Cold War Bunker show within York

The York Cold War Bunker is a two-storey, semi-subterranean, Cold War bunker in the Holgate area of York, England, built in 1961 to monitor nuclear explosions and fallout in Yorkshire, in the event of nuclear war.

One of about 30 around the United Kingdom, the building was used throughout its operational existence as the regional headquarters and control centre for the Royal Observer Corps's No. 20 Group YORK between 1961 and 1991. It has become an English Heritage Scheduled Monument and was opened in 2006 by English Heritage as a tourist attraction.

The fully restored building contains air filtration and generating plant, kitchen and canteen, dormitories, radio and landline communication equipment and specialist 1980s computers and a fully equipped operations room with vertical illuminated perspex maps.

== History ==
York Cold War Bunker was opened on 16th December 1961 by the Earl of Scarborough. It was constructed in the orchard of Shelley House, an Edwardian Manor House used for government offices. The bunker was designed for members of the Royal Observer Corps, and replaced the previous ROC structure in York at Knavesmire. The site was used for training exercises from 1962 until 1991, when standdown of the Royal Observer Corps occurred. The bunker cost around £45,000 to construct, matching the price of other pagoda style bunkers.

During its Cold War operational period, the building could have supported 60 local volunteer members of the Royal Observer Corps, inclusive of a ten-man United Kingdom Warning and Monitoring Organisation scientific warning team. They would have collated details of nuclear bombs exploded within the UK and tracked radioactive fallout across the Yorkshire region, warning the public of its approach.

In a period of growing tension, observers would have been called into the bunker during a "Transition to War" (TTW) period. This period would have allowed observers to swap in and out every 8 hours, with the aim of there being 60 observers in the bunker, should nuclear war begin. The only use of the bunker during a time of heightened political tension was during the 1962 Cuban Missile Crisis, when the bunker was on alert. However, even at this point, the bunker was not fully staffed.

The bunker was never designed to be a secret bunker.

English Heritage became the custodians of York Cold War Bunker in 1999, after merging with the Royal Commission for the Protection of Historic Monuments. They began to renovate the site, which had been flooded with ground water, in 2001, adding an accessible toilet and staff office, an access ramp, and removing the administrative building which had previously stood outside the structure. The cost of the renovation was £240,000.

== Layout and content ==
The bunker has three levels. The entrance is elevated from the ground, and there are a series of blast doors upon entry.

Immediately on the left upon entering the bunker there are two decontamination rooms. These are to remove fallout found on the body. The first decontamination room has two sinks attached to hoses, and a hot box, in which contaminated clothing would go. The second room contains a single sink and a hose. To the right, upon entry into the bunker, is a radiator room and an aerosols filter chamber. The upper level also houses a hoist and the water tank.

The middle floor is the largest in the bunker. It contains an ejector room for sewage, a plant room, the canteen and kitchen, the telephone exchange, officer's room, and would have originally had both a male and female dormitory. The male dormitory has now been removed. The mid-level also has the upper portion of the operations room.

The lowest level of the bunker contains the well of the operations room, a communications room, a wireless room, and a cleaning cupboard.

=== Operation Room ===
The operation room is split across two levels. The upper level consists of a balcony, which houses headsets and tote boards, bomb slats, and a triangulation alcove. The lower level has a series of perspex maps, a board to track fallout decay rates, and a map table in the centre. Connecting the two levels is a ladder. There is also a main staircase, leading from the main corridor on the second floor to the lower entry point to the operation room.

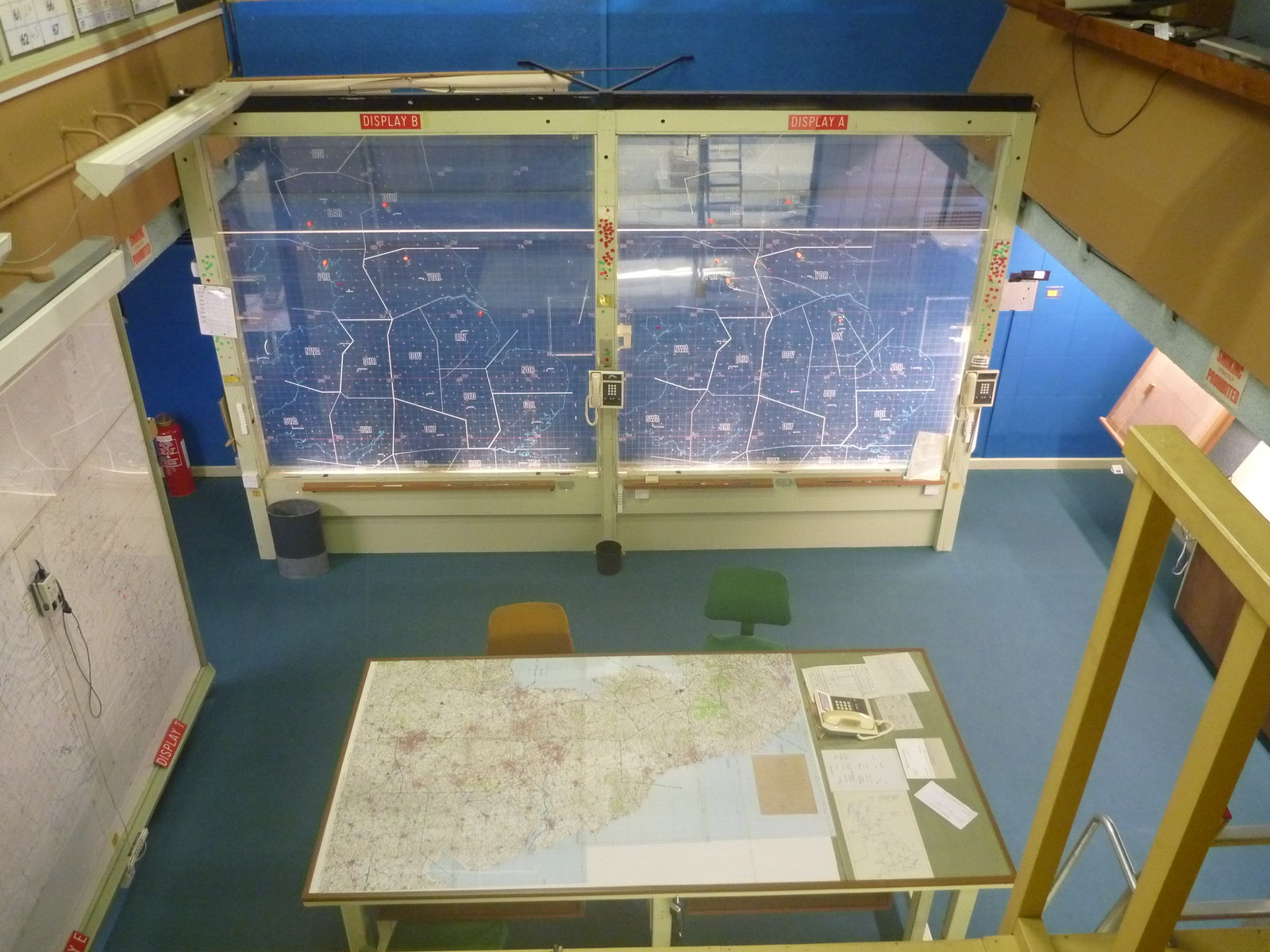
The lower well of the operations room, showing display A and B.

The operation room is the centre of the bunker. Information would be fed into the operation room from observation posts, and this data would be plotted and displayed in order to track the progression of the war by post display plotters. The upper balcony of the operations room contains six nuclear burst tote boards and a board in which bomb slats are inserted, so that those in the well of the operations room can easily see the situation.

The principal monitoring post instruments are the same as those often found in the smaller observation posts: a ground zero indicator, a bomb power indicator, and a fixed survey meter. These three pieces of equipment relay the location and power of the bomb, as well as the amount of fallout in the immediate area. They are stored in an alcove to the right of the post display plotters. York Cold War Bunker is one of twelve group headquarters equipped with an Atomic Weapon Detection Recognition and Estimation of Yield (AWDREY), and part of this would be stored in the upper balcony of the operations room. The detection head would sit on the roof.

The well of the operations room contains a series of display boards, which would be used to track the location of bombs. Display A offers an immeadiate overview of the conflict, with Display B being updated every two hours. Display T displays the entirety of the United Kingdom, and Display E shows the whole of Europe. Data was written on these via chinagraph pencils.
