= West Bank Park =

Park in York, England

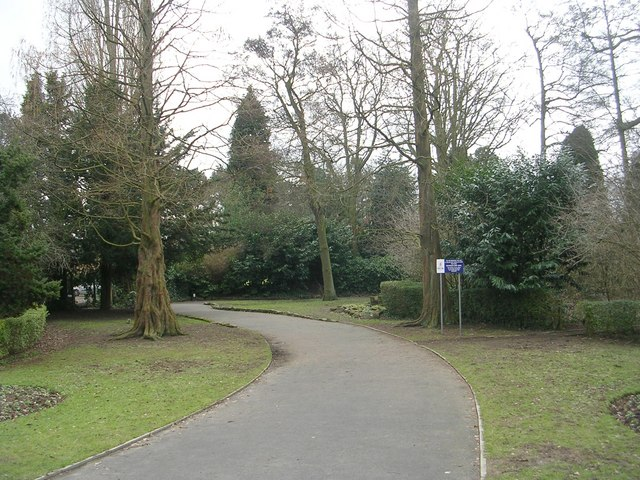
- West Bank Park – Acomb Road
- Interactive map of West Bank Park
- Location: Holgate, York, England
- OS grid: SE 582511
- Coordinates: 53.9534°N 1.1109°W
- Area: 20 acres (8.1 ha)
- Created: 1936–1938
- Awards: Green Flag

West Bank Park is a public open space in Holgate, the city of York, in Northern England. The area was previously a nursery owned by James Backhouse before being converted into a park in the 1930s.

== History ==
In the 19th century, the botanist James Backhouse owned a nursery in Holgate which covered 100 acres (40 ha), and was known worldwide, having the nickname of the "Kew of the North". During the second half of the 19th century, Backhouse had several large greenhouses built to grow ferns, with the Backhouse family being credited as "Britain's leading cultivators of exotic ferns." Part of this land became West Bank Park in the early 20th century, and now has grassed areas and woodland. The northern part of the woodland had previously been the site of a small lake, which archaeological evidence showed had silted up by the time the area was converted into a park. The land was converted into a park between 1936 and 1938, but larger-scale development of the area was halted until after the Second World War, and then West Bank House was demolished in 1974. The house had been built by Backhouse in 1853, and then sold to Sir James Hamilton in 1910, alter becoming a home for unwed mothers. Less maintenance of the park and rising crimes rates saw the formation of the Friends of West Bank Park in 1993.

In the northern part of the park is a grade II listed statue of Queen Victoria. It was created in 1905 by George Milburn and intended to commemorate the reign of Queen Victoria by being placed in the Guildhall in York. However, at some point during the 20th century it was removed to West Bank Park, and has been renovated as recently as 2018.

In 2013, the council stopped locking the park gates on an evening in an effort to save money. The locking of the gates was reinstated by the Friends of West Bank Park in 2016, which saw vandalism and crime rates in the park drop by 50%. West Bank Park has been awarded a green flag for every year between 2006 and 2024.

== Facilities and transport ==
Buses connect the city centre with West Bank Park; services 1 and 5, both run by FirstBus York, though service number 1 runs directly past the parks' northern entrance. The park has children's play areas, bowling greens, woodland, and standard and adapted toilets. One of the children's play areas additionally has a basketball court, and there is a children's wildlife area with a pond, and bird feeding. The mature woodland at the north end of the park includes dawn and giant redwoods.

The park used to have a cafe by the bowling greens, which was also used to teach cooking skills to those with special needs. It closed down in 2009, and efforts have been made to re-open the cafe, or to open a newer cafe in the old gate-keeper's lodge.
