= Listed buildings in Stutton with Hazlewood =

Stutton with Hazlewood is a civil parish in the county of North Yorkshire, England. It contains ten listed buildings that are recorded in the National Heritage List for England. Of these, two are listed at Grade I, the highest of the three grades, and the others are at Grade II, the lowest grade. The parish contains the village of Stutton and the surrounding area. The most important buildings in the parish are the country house Hazlewood Castle, and its chapel. These are both listed, together with associated structures. The other listed buildings consist of a house, a public house, a farmhouse and a former windmill.

== Key ==
Grade	Criteria
I	Buildings of exceptional interest, sometimes considered to be internationally important
II	Buildings of national importance and special interest

== Buildings ==
Name and location	Photograph	Date	Notes	Grade
Hazlewood Castle; 53.85233°N 1.31920°W		Mid-13th century	A fortified country house that has been altered and extended through the centuries, and later used for other purposes. It is built in magnesian limestone with some concrete, and has roofs of Welsh slate and lead. There are two storeys and a basement, and an approximately H-shaped plan. The south front has 13 bays, consisting of a central range of five bays, flanked by two projecting bays and two recessed bays. It has a chamfered plinth, and an embattled parapet. A flight of steps with a decorative iron balustrade leads up to the central doorway that has Roman Doric columns, a pattered fanlight, a fluted frieze, and a dentilled pediment. The windows are 20th-century casements. At the rear is a tower, and an arcade of blind round arches.	I
St Leonard's Chapel; 53.85245°N 1.31867°W		c. 1283–85	The chapel, associated with Hazlewood Castle, is in magnesian limestone and has a grey slate roof. It consists of a continuous nave and chancel, a south porch, and a south vestry. On the west gable is a twin bellcote. The porch has a chamfered pointed arch with a hood mould, above which is a statue of Saint Leonard.	I
Churchyard cross 53.85232°N 1.31862°W	—	15th century (probable)	The cross in the churchyard of St Leonard's Chapel is in magnesian limestone on a later base. The base is square and stepped, on which is a plinth on a base with figures on the corners. The shaft is tapering and octagonal, with a moulded cornice, and the remaining arm of an ornamental cross head decorated with foliate motifs.	II
Manor House; 53.86682°N 1.27092°W	—	1697	The house is in magnesian limestone, with a stone slate roof, hipped on the left, and with stone coping and a kneeler on the right. There are two storeys and three bays. The doorway has a chamfered surround and a massive lintel. On the upper floor is a fire window with a double chamfered surround, and the other windows are sashes with quoined surrounds.	II
Hare and Hounds; 53.86663°N 1.27153°W		1730	A house, later a public house, in magnesian limestone and whitewashed roughcast brick, with a Welsh slate roof. There are two storeys and an L-shaped plan, with a main range of three bays and a gabled wing on the right. The doorway has a hood, above it is an ornamental plaque, and the windows are casements with hoods.	II
Groom's House, stable and walls north of Hazlewood Castle; 53.85260°N 1.31933°W		Mid to late 18th century	The buildings are in magnesian limestone with a grey slate roof. The house has two storeys and five bays, a plinth, an impost band, a sill band, an eaves band and a hipped roof. The ground floor has an arcade containing a central doorway and round-headed windows, and on the upper floor are sash windows with flat heads. There are adjoining walls, and on the south side is a Tudor arched carriage entrance.	II
St Margaret's Guest House and wall north of Hazlewood Castle; 53.85286°N 1.31903°W	—	Mid to late 18th century	Originally stables, later used for other purposes, the building is in magnesian limestone on a plinth, with a projecting eaves bands, and a hipped Welsh slate roof. There are two storeys and eight bays, the middle four bays projecting under a pediment containing a circular sundial. The second and seventh bays contain flat-headed doorway with patterned fanlights. The windows are sashes, those on the ground floor of the middle four bays with round-arched heads, and the others with flat heads. To the west is a wall containing a round-arched opening within a larger arch with imposts and a cornice.	II
Folly northeast of Hazlewood Castle; 53.85314°N 1.31843°W		Late 18th century	The folly is in magnesian limestone, on a plinth, and it has a continuous sill band, a cornice, and an embattled parapet. There is an octagonal plan, and it contains two doorways, one with a trefoil head and blocked, and the other later with a straight head. Between the doorways are blocked trefoil-headed windows, and above are blind oculi.	II
Crossroads Farmhouse; 53.85614°N 1.34360°W		c. 1800	A public house, later a farmhouse, in stone, partly rendered, with a hipped stone slate roof. There are two storeys and five bays, and a wing to the northeast with two storeys and three bays. The central doorway has a stuccoed surround and a fanlight. The windows are sashes, and at the rear is a large round-headed stair window.	II
Windmill; 53.87217°N 1.27809°W		Early 19th century (probable)	A former tower windmill in Tadcaster limestone, it has a circular plan, and is tapering, and is without a roof. On each side are straight-headed entrances, and there are irregularly spaced square window openings above.	II
