= Vavasour baronets =

Baronetcy in the Baronetage of the United Kingdom

There have been five baronetcies created for persons with the surname Vavasour, three in the Baronetage of England and two in the Baronetage of the United Kingdom. As of 2008 four of the creations are extinct while one is extant.

- Vavasour Baronets of Hazlewood (1628)
- Vavasour Baronets of Killingthorpe (1631): see Sir Charles Vavasour, 1st Baronet (died 1644)
- Vavasour baronets of Copmanthorpe (1643): see Sir William Vavasour, 1st Baronet (died 1659)
- Vavasour Baronets of Spaldington (1801)
- Vavasour baronets, of Hazlewood (second creation, 1828)

== Citations and sources ==
=== Sources ===
- Burke, John; Burke, Bernard (1844). A Genealogical and Heraldic History of the Extinct and Dormant Baronetcies of England, Ireland and Scotland (2nd ed.). London: John Russell Smith.
- Cokayne, George Edward (1902). Complete Baronetage, 1611 to 1800. Vol. 2 (1st ed.). Exeter: William Pollard & Co. OCLC 866278985. – 1625 to 1649
