= Stutton Windmill =

Windmill in Stutton, North Yorkshire, England

Coordinates: 53°52′20″N 1°16′41″W

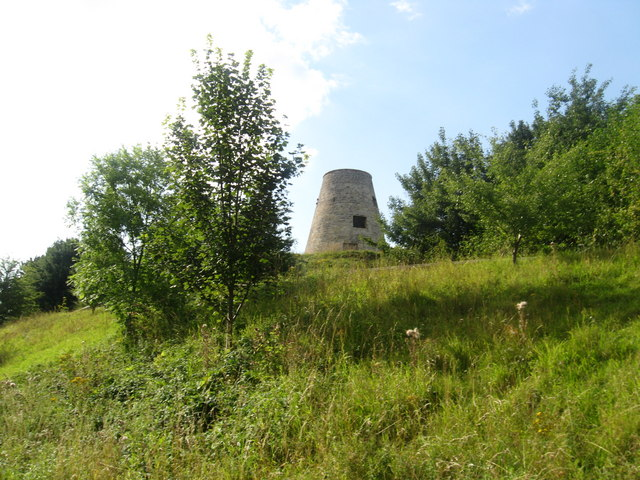
The building, in 2009

Stutton Windmill is a historic building in Stutton, North Yorkshire, a village in England.

The windmill was built to grind corn, probably in the early 19th century. It is identical in design to the demolished Carr Mill, which was at Laughton-en-le-Morthen. It appears to have been disused by 1893, and was long derelict by the 1940s. The sails have since been removed. Much of the ground around the mill was removed when the Tadcaster bypass was constructed in the 1970s, leaving the building standing on a mound. The building was restored in 2008 by the Samuel Smith Old Brewery. It has been grade II listed since 1987.

The windmill is built of Tadcaster limestone. It has a circular plan, and is tapering, and is without a roof. On each side are straight-headed entrances, and there are irregularly spaced square window openings above. Inside are the remains of two millstones, each marked with a cross.

== See also ==
- Listed buildings in Stutton with Hazlewood
