= Vavasour family =

English Catholic family

The Vavasour family are an English Catholic family whose history dates back to Norman times. The fortified manor of Hazlewood was held by the Vavasour family for nearly nine centuries from the Norman Conquest on and provided refuge for Catholics during the persecution of Catholics through the reign of Henry VIII, King of England. There are several branches of the family, some of whom have intermarried with other notable Catholic families, and are descended from William le Vavasour. A vavasour was a type of feudal liegeman.

== History ==
They are featured on the Battle Abbey Roll and lived at Hazlewood Castle from the time of the Domesday Book until 1908. The Vavasours are of Anglo-Norman descent and the various branches of the family are said to have descended from William le Vavasour, paternal grandfather of Maud le Vavasour, Baroness Butler. During the years between the English Reformation up until the Catholic Emancipation, the Vavasours were noted as a recusant family for remaining staunchly Catholic despite being fined numerous times.

By showing up at services several times a year and pretending to conform to Anglicanism, they largely escaped persecution and managed to retain their property and wealth.

== Notable members of the family ==
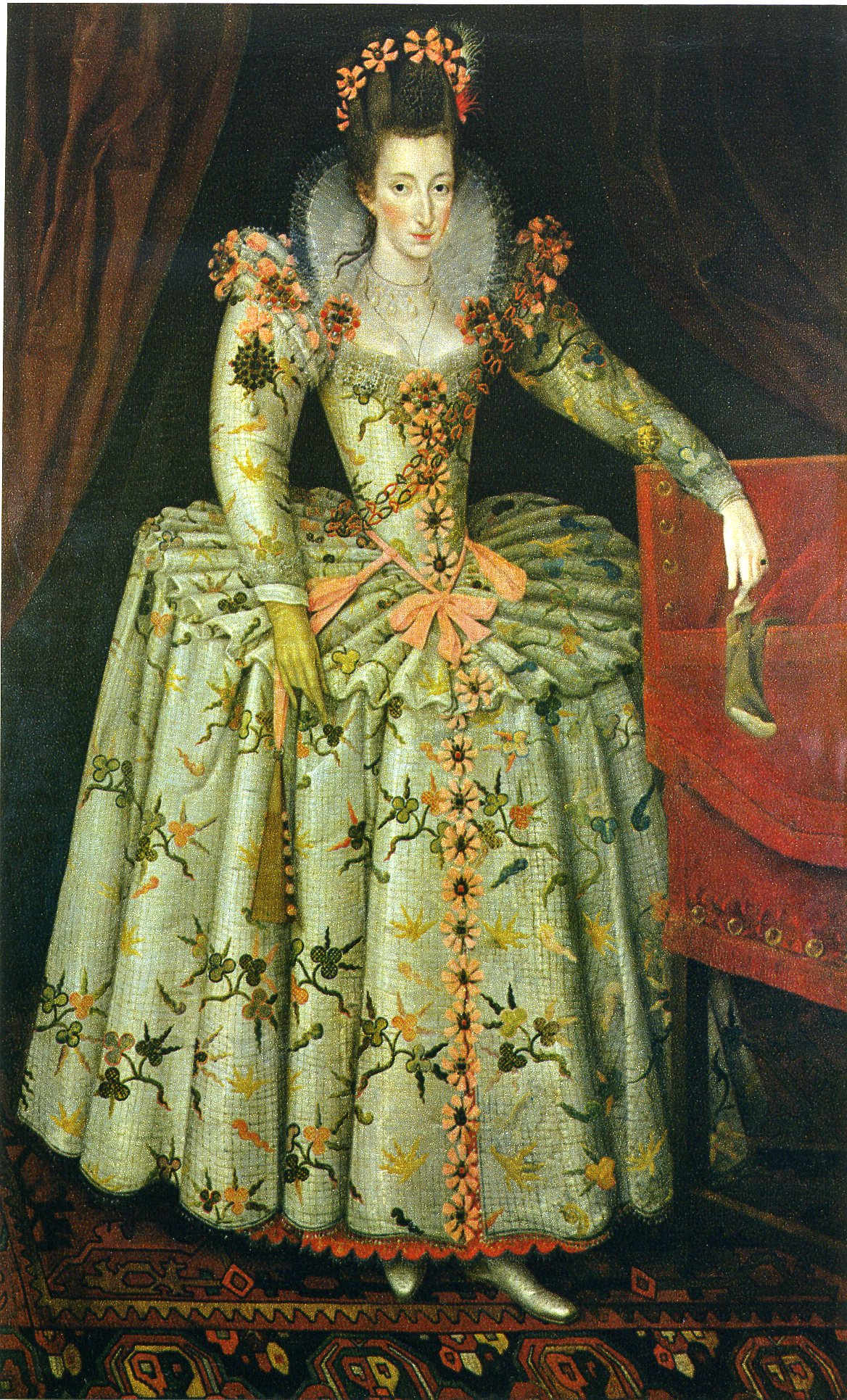
Anne Vavasour, her first lover was Elizabethan courtier and poet Edward de Vere, 17th Earl of Oxford, by whom she had a son. By the orders of Elizabeth, Queen of England, both were arrested for that offence. She was the inspiration, protagonist, and possibly the actual author, of the poem, Anne Vavasour's Echo. Painting attributed to John de Critz, c. 1605

- Sir William Vavasour (1514–1566) was High Sheriff of Yorkshire 1548–1563, his son John was convicted in 1610 of being a Catholic recusant.
- Thomas Vavasour (about 1536/7–2 May 1585) was a physician and recusant of the reign of Elizabeth, Queen of England.
- Anne Vavasour (c.1560 – c.1650) was a maid of honour to Elizabeth, Queen of England and the mistress of two aristocratic men. One was Edward de Vere, 17th Earl of Oxford, with whom she had a child, and for which both were locked in the Tower of London by the Queen.
- Thomas Vavasour (1560 - 1620) was Knight Marshal to James, King of England and Ireland and Butler of the Port of London, who built sumptuous mansion by the Thames Ham House in 1610. His elder sister was Anne Vavasour.

=== Baronets (1628 Baronetcy of Hazlewood, Yorkshire) ===
The first (and now extinct) Vavasour Baronetcy.

- Thomas Vavasour, 1st Bt. (24 October 1628 - before 1636)
- Walter Vavasour, 2nd Bt. (before 1636 - after 1666)
- Walter Vavasour, 3rd Bt. (after 1666 - 16 February 1713)
- Walter Vavasour, 4th Bt. (1713 - May 1740)
- Walter Vavasour, 5th Bt. (1740 - 13 April 1766)
- Walter Vavasour, 6th Bt. (1766 - 3 November 1802)
- Thomas Vavasour, 7th Bt. (1802 - 20 January 1826)

The baronetcy became extinct upon the death of the 7th baronet.

=== Baronets (1828 Baronetcy of Hazlewood, Yorkshire) ===
The fifth creation of the Vavasour baronetcy and the only one still extant.

- Hon. Sir Edward Marmaduke Joseph Stourton, 1st Bt. (1786-1847) (created Baronet in 1828)
- Sir Edward Marmaduke Joseph Vavasour, 2nd Bt. (1815-1885)
- Sir William Edward Joseph Vavasour, 3rd Bt. (1845-1915)
- Sir Leonard Pius Vavasour, 4th Bt. (1881-1961)
- Sir Geoffrey William Vavasour, 5th Bt. (1914-1997)
- Sir Eric Michel Joseph Marmaduke Vavasour, 6th Bt. (born 3 January 1953)
