= Holgate Windmill =

Listed windmill in York, England

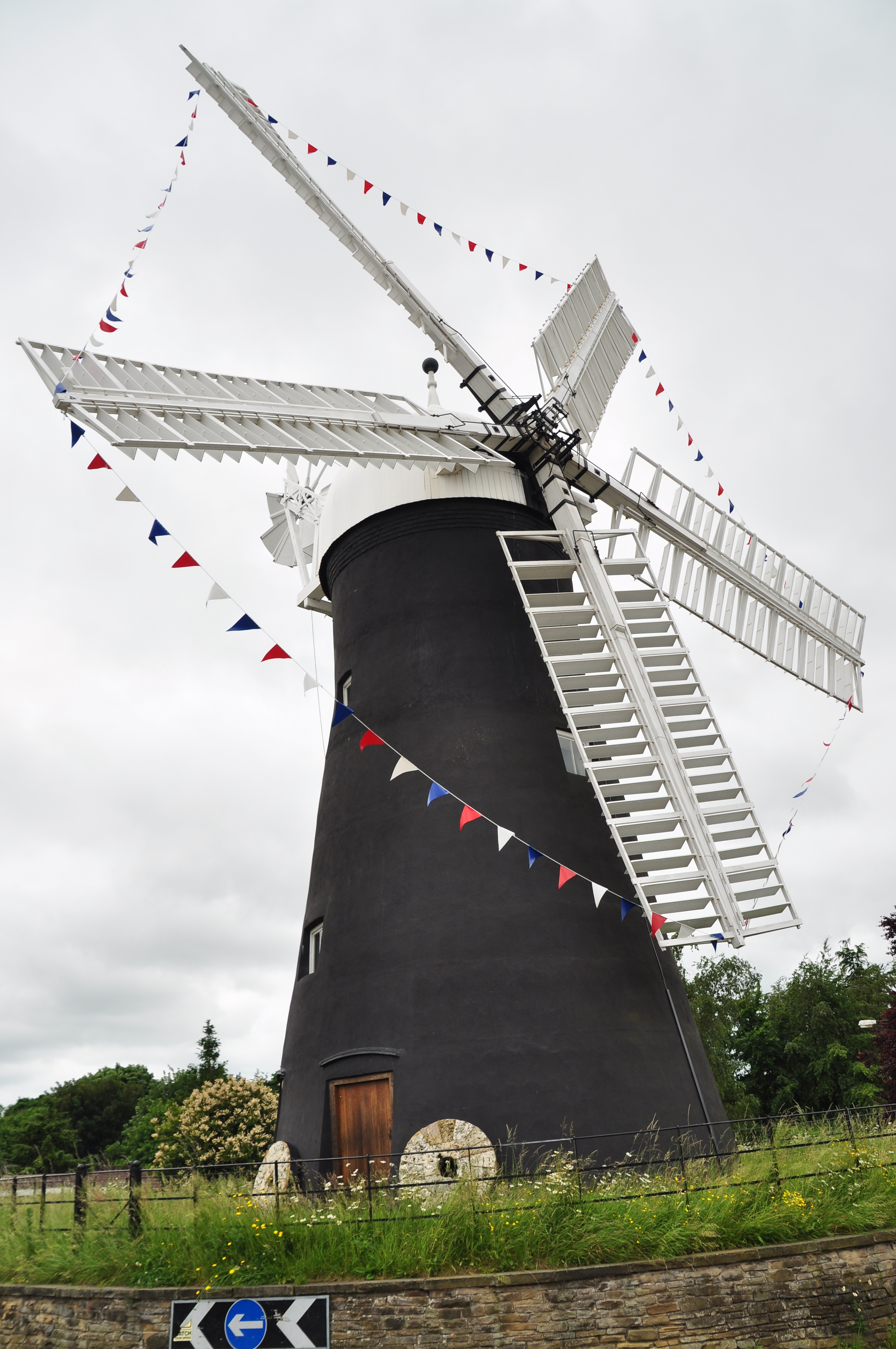
- The mill in 2014
- Interactive map of Holgate Windmill

Origin
- Mill name: Holgate Mill
- Mill location: Windmill Rise, Holgate, York, England
- Grid reference: SE 5841 5148
- Coordinates: 53.9561°N 1.1113°W
- Operator: Holgate Windmill Preservation Society
- Year built: 1770; 256 years ago

Information
- Purpose: Corn mill
- Type: Tower mill
- Storeys: 5
- No. of sails: 5
- Type of sails: Double Patent sails
- Windshaft: Cast iron
- Winding: Fantail
- Fantail blades: 8
- Auxiliary power: Electric motor (1930)
- No. of pairs of millstones: 4
- Other information: Restored and working

Holgate Windmill is a brick tower mill built in 1770 on Windmill Rise in Holgate, a suburb of York, England. Constructed for the miller George Waud, it worked with roller‑reefing and later double‑patent sails, and was equipped during the 19th century with several pairs of French Burr millstones and dressing machines. The mill was enlarged in the mid‑19th century with a new granary, an additional storey and a steam engine, and continued in use after 1930 with an electric motor until milling ceased in 1933.

The mill deteriorated until the formation of the Holgate Windmill Preservation Society in 2001. A major restoration began in 2006, including structural repairs, new render, and the replacement of the cap and curb ring. Five new sails were fitted in 2011, and the mill turned under wind power again in 2012 for the first time since the 1930s. It has since been restored to working order and is open to the public.

== History ==
Holgate tower windmill was built in 1770 of brickstones by its first owner and miller George Waud. He, his son and grandson ran the mill until 1851, and a dwelling-house was erected around the same time. The mill was originally fitted with five Roller Reefing sails although these were later replaced by Double Patent sails. In 1841, the mill was described as having three pairs of French Burr millstones, two dressing machines and five Patent sails. A fourth pair of stones had been added by 1858.

In 1859 a new granary was built, and a steam engine installed to make the mill more profitable. An extra floor was also built to raise the mill to its present height.

In 1930, a large electric motor was installed to replace the steam engine, chimney and boiler house, which were pulled down. After some storm damage (sails backwinded), the mill had to stop grinding under wind power, and the City Council had the sails and the fantail removed. Milling with the electric motor ceased entirely in 1933. In 1939, a new white-painted cap was built onto the milltower. The mill's last known miller was Thomas Mollet; Eliza Gutch and her family were the last known owners of the mill.

The mill was given Grade II listed building status in 1954. In 1955 further cap repairs were made, and its five stocks (whips, sailbacks) were removed in 1956.

In 2001 the Holgate Preservation Society was formed, and the mill's doors were opened to the public in 2005 for the first time after 70 years. Planning for the restoration of the mill began in 2003, and the restoration started in 2006. Scaffolding was erected around the mill to remove the external black paint and render. Electricity supply was installed, and new oak doors and windows were built in. A new lime render was applied to the outer walls. In autumn 2006, the old cap with shears, brake wheel and iron cross was removed by crane, along with the old curb ring which carried the cap. The iron ring was broken and the supporting wooden frame was rotten. In 2007, most of the external renovation works were completed, a newly manufactured curb ring was lifted in, the scaffolding was removed, and the mill's open top was sealed against rain.

A new white cap with ball finial, brake wheel, windshaft, shears and fivefold iron cross including the fantail rack was craned onto the mill on 28 November 2009. Five new sails were fitted on 20 December 2011; the following year, shutters were added and in April the sails turned, powered by the wind for the first time since 1930. The official opening of the now restored mill took place on 23 June 2012.

The mill typically works two days a week producing around 75 kilograms (165 lb) of wholemeal and spelt flour. During the COVID-19 outbreak, an upsurge in demand has seen an increase to 400 kilograms (880 lb) per week.

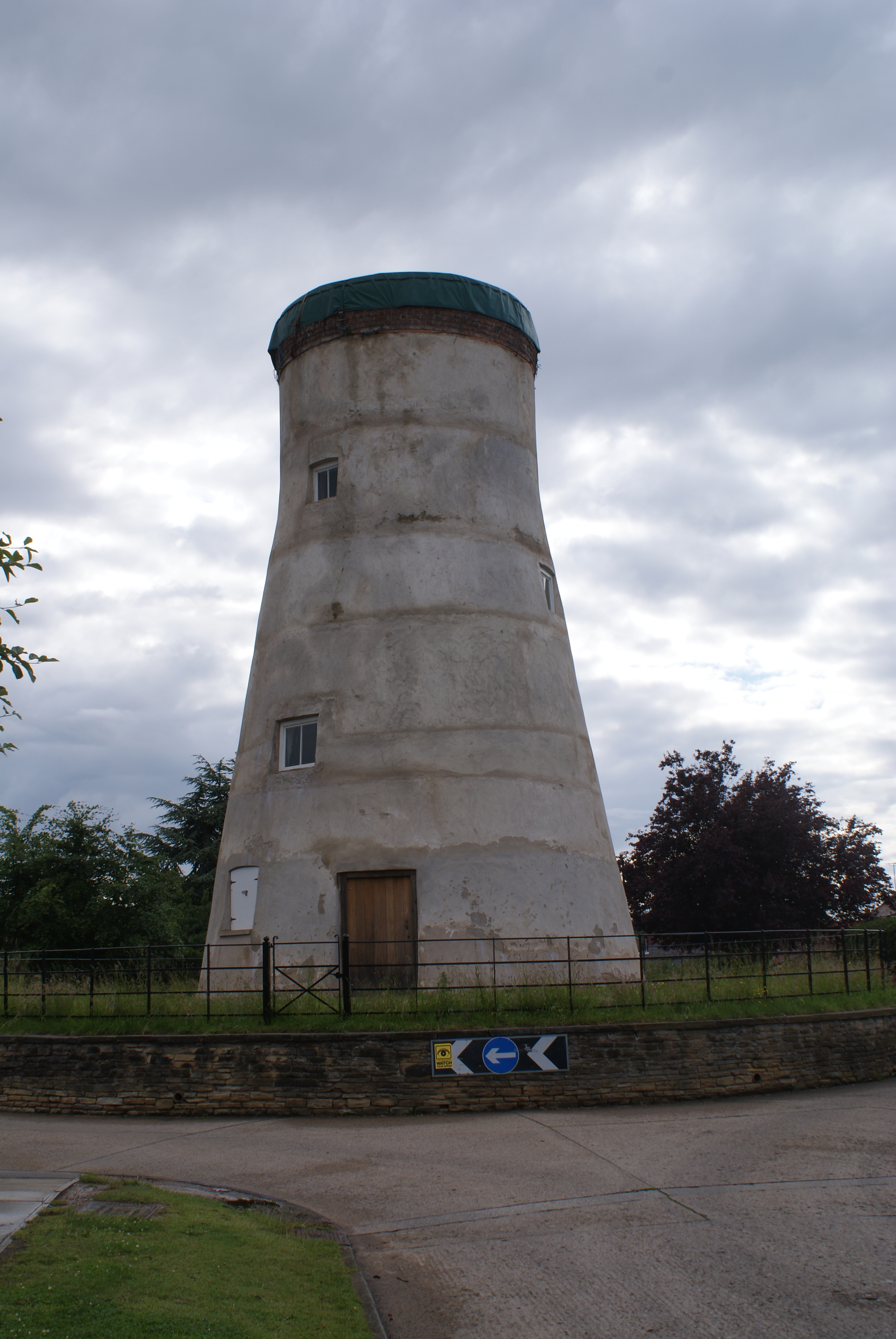
June 2009, prior to external restoration

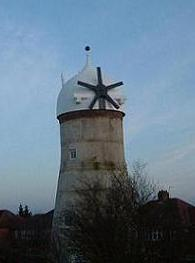
November 2009 when the new white cap was added

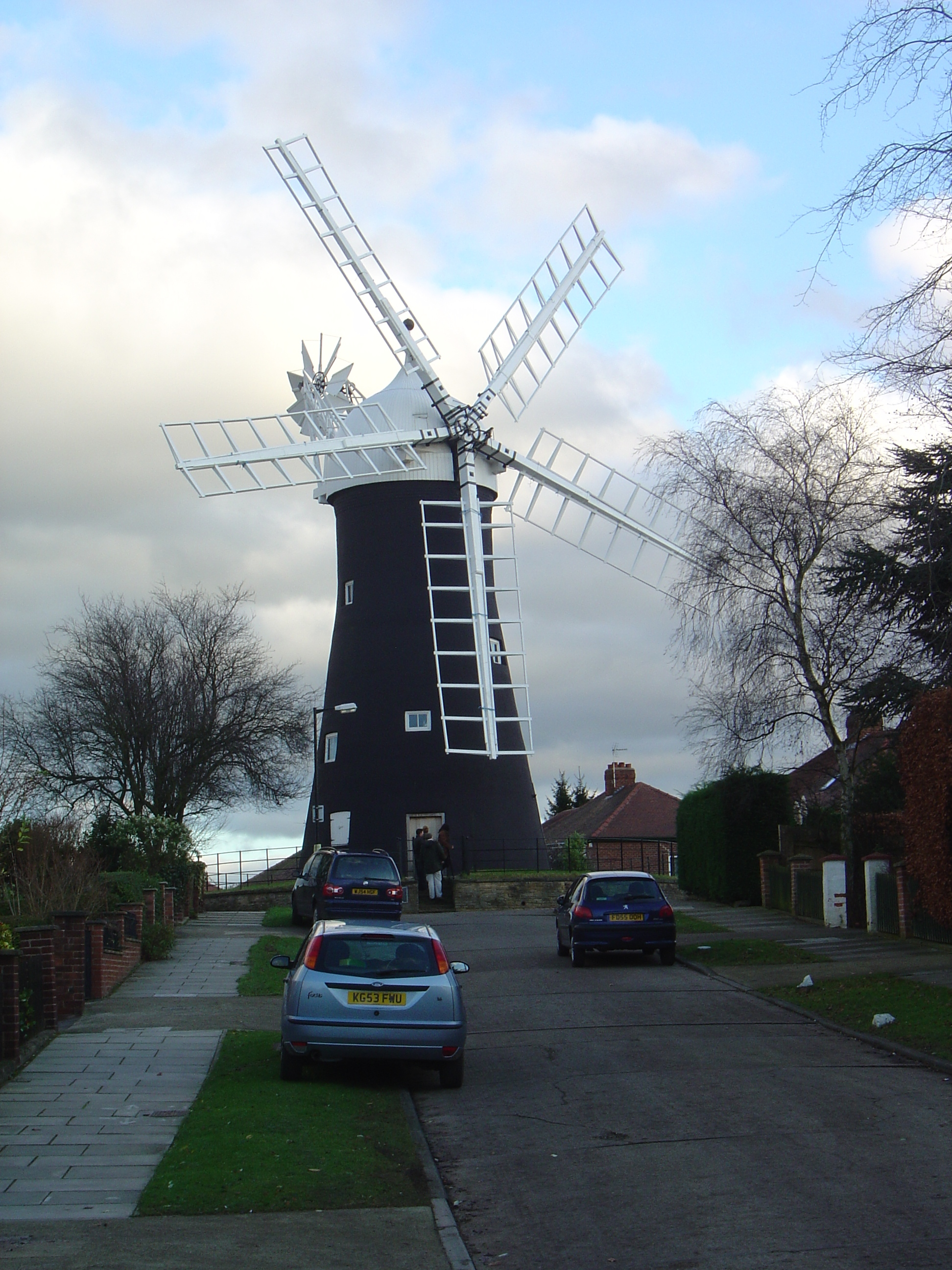
December 2011, just after restoration of the sails, but before the shutters had been installed

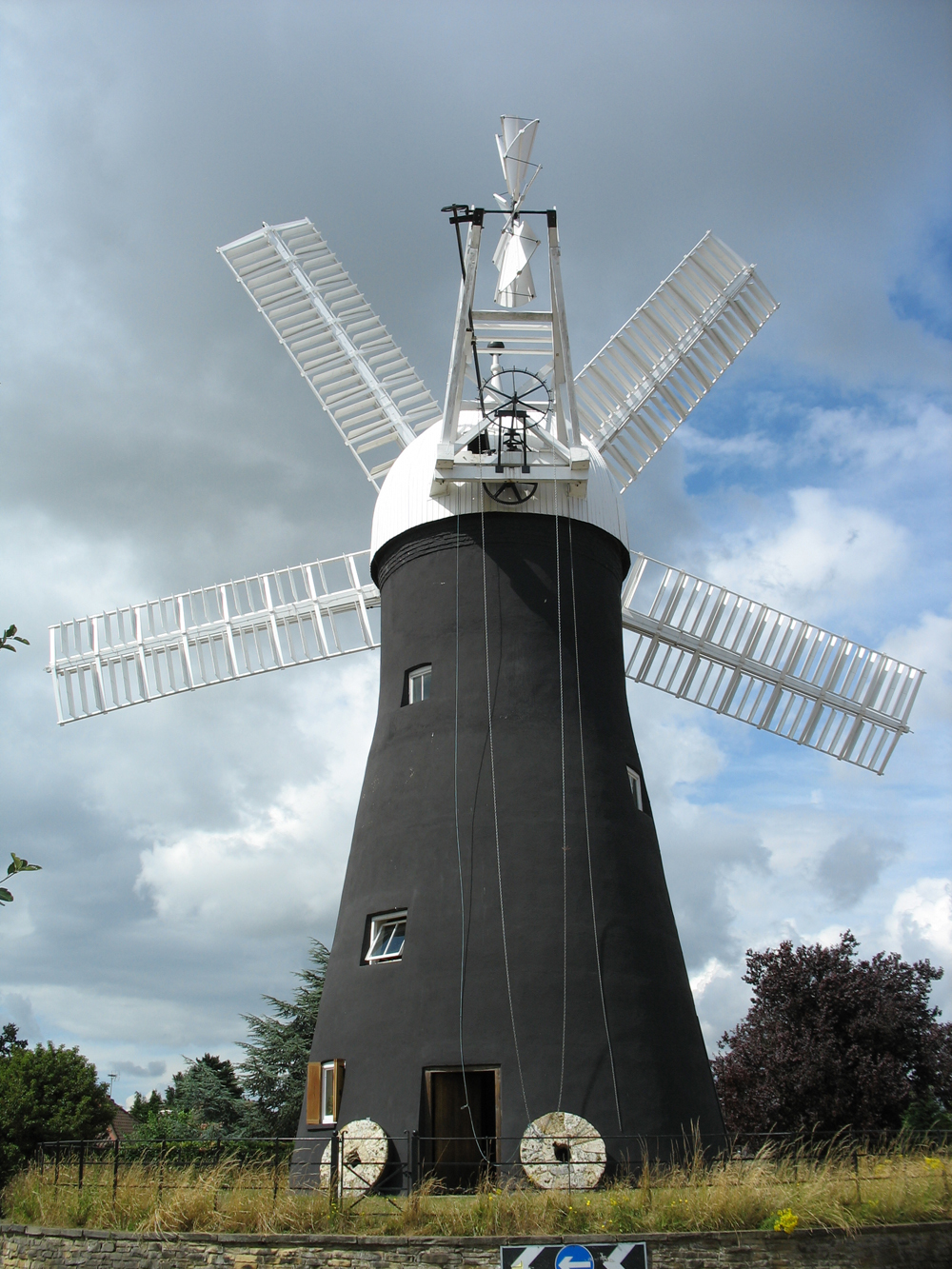
The fully restored mill in July 2013

== Description ==
Holgate Mill is a five-storey tower mill including ground storey. The storeys are: meal floor, stones floor, bin floor, dust floor, and cap. The mill originally had a black ogee cap, since 1939 a white cap which was winded by a fantail. There were five Double Patent sails carried on a cast-iron windshaft and mounted on a cross in the Lincolnshire style (Lincolnshire cross). The mill drove four pairs of millstones, three pairs of French Burrs and one pair of Peaks.

== Millers ==
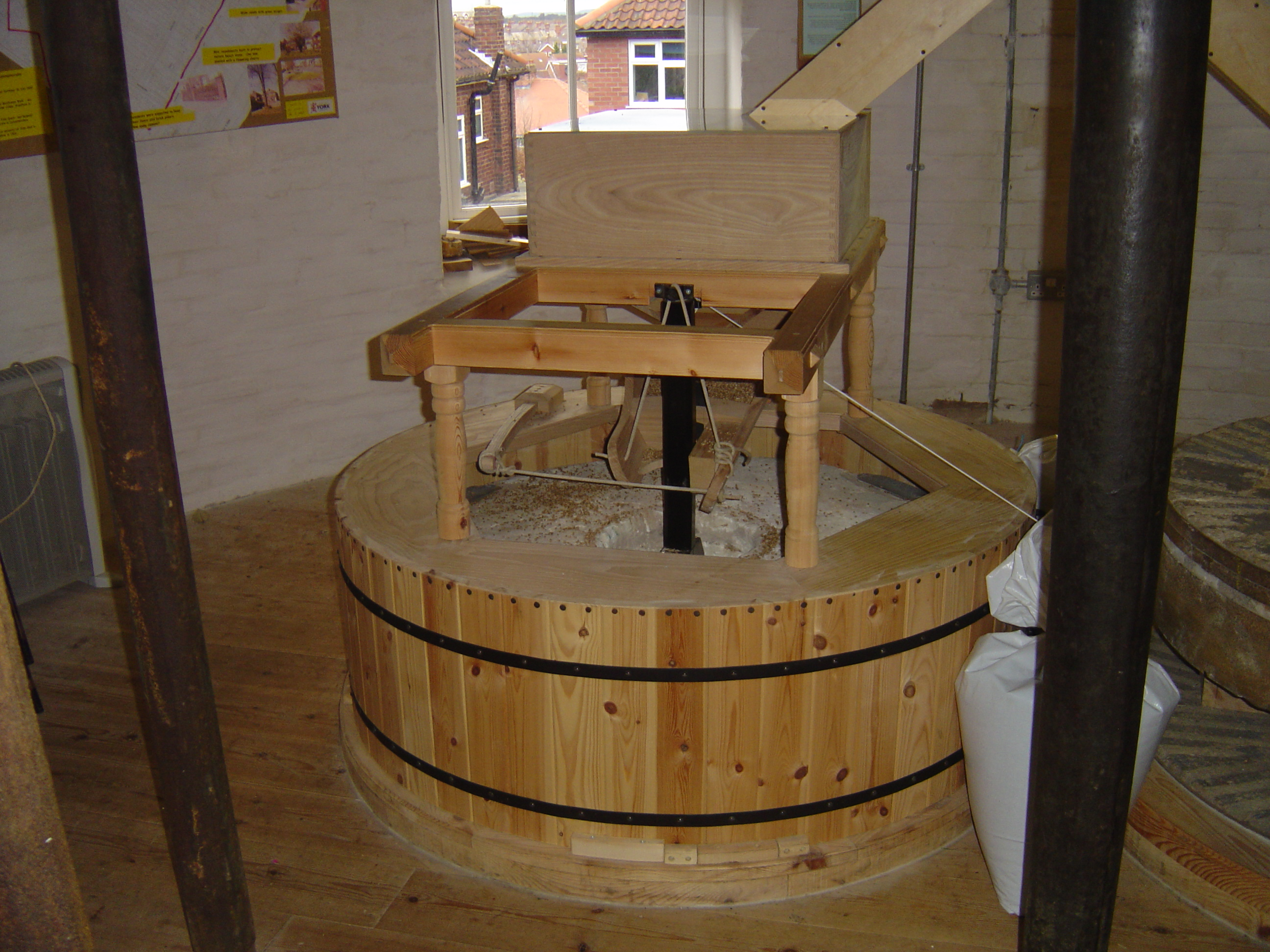
The millstones inside the mill

- George Waud 1770–1792
- George Waud Jr 1792–1811
- George Waud grandson 1811–1851 (John Musham mortgagee from 1841, then mill owner from 1851)
- John Thackwray 1851–1855 (Joseph Peart mill owner from 1855)
- George & Joseph Chapman (brothers) 1858–1860
- William Bean Horseman 1860–1866
- Joseph Chapman 1866–1896
- Charles Chapman (son of Joseph) 1896–1902
- Herbert Warters 1902–1922 (Gutch family owners from approx 1902)
- Thomas Mollett 1922–1933

== See also ==
- List of windmills in North Yorkshire
- Listed buildings in York (outside the city walls, southern part)
