= Hazlewood Castle =

Hotel in North Yorkshire, England

Coordinates: 53.8523°N 1.3192°W

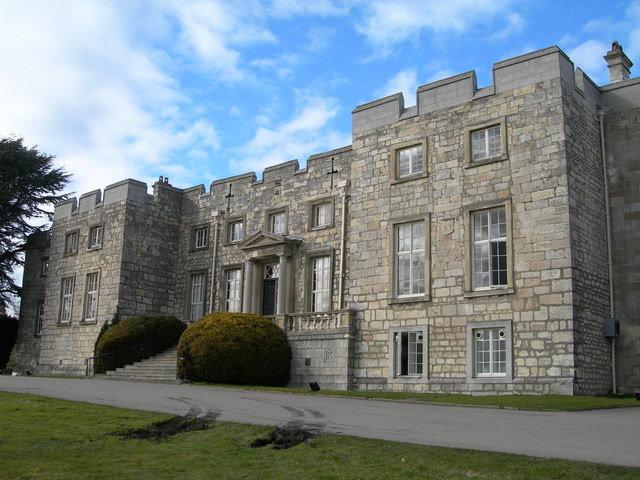
Hazlewood Castle

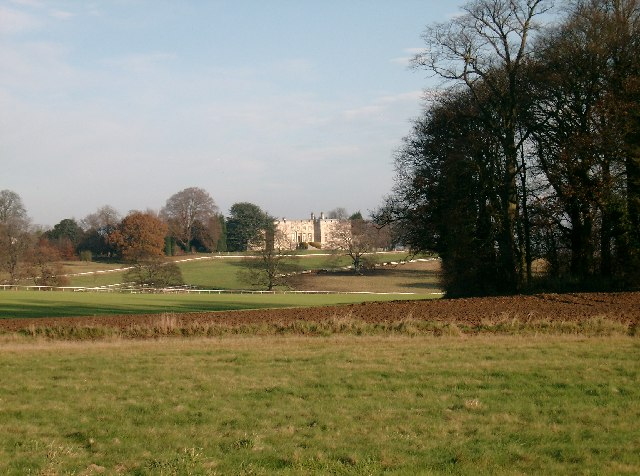
Hazlewood Castle

Hazlewood Castle is a country residence, now a hotel, in North Yorkshire, England, by the A1 and A64 between Aberford and Tadcaster. It is one of the oldest fortified houses to survive in the whole of Yorkshire.

The site overlooked the battlefield for the Battle of Towton in 1461, and during the persecution of Catholics through the reign of Henry VIII provided refuge for Catholic priests.

== History ==
The castle was built towards the end of the 13th century and was transformed into a mansion in the mid 18th century.

The first records of the house are to be found in the Domesday Book of 1086, described as being owned and occupied by Sir Mauger the Vavasour (a vavasour was a type of feudal liegeman). Hazlewood was then inhabited by descendants of the Vavasours for over 900 years. During the Second Barons' War (1264–1267) the chapel was burnt down by a rival branch of the Vavasour family. It was rebuilt in 1283 by Sir William Vavasour and in 1290 fortified and crenellated.

In 1217 Robert Vavasour was Sheriff of York and his statue was placed above the door of York Minster in recognition of the fact that he gave stone from his Tadcaster quarry to maintain the cathedral.

Sir William Vavasour was High Sheriff of Yorkshire for 1548 and 1563 and MP for Yorkshire in 1553. His son John Vavasour was host to Mary, Queen of Scots on the night of 27 January 1569, when she passed through Wetherby en-route between Bolton Castle and Tutbury Castle.

John was convicted in 1610 of being a Catholic recusant. His nephew and heir William was gaoled for five years in Newgate prison in London for the same reason. William's son Thomas was forced to pay an annual fine even though he had been made a baronet in 1628. The second Baronet was a Royalist during the Civil War and was obliged to flee to France, not returning until the restoration of the monarchy in 1660.

Under the 6th Baronet the house was substantially modernised. On the death of the unmarried 7th Baronet in 1826 the baronetcy was extinguished and the estate passed to Edward Stourton, a relative. In 1828 he took the name Vavasour and was made the 1st Baronet Vavasour of the second creation. In 1908 the Vavasour family sold Hazlewood and bought a sheep farm and land in the Awatere Valley, New Zealand and in the 1970s established the valley's first winery, Vavasour Winery. After 1908 the site changed hands many times over the following years. It was first owned by a solicitor named Simpson, whose family occupied it until 1953, although it also served as a maternity hospital during the Second World War (and afterwards until 1953). For a few years it then belonged to the Fawcett family until it was sold in 1958 to Donald Hart, who sold it on as a retreat for the Carmelite Friars from 1971 until 1996. At the time of the sale to the Carmelite Order, the building was listed and is now a grade I listed building.

== Present-day ==
In 1997, after restoration, the house reopened as Hazlewood Castle Hotel-Restaurant-Café and Cookery School under the management of Richard Carr, John Benson-Smith and Alison Benson-Smith.

The Castle won Hotel of the year, Restaurant of the year and also Chef of the year and the Chef Director John Benson-Smith also appeared on BBC MasterChef as a judge.

Hazlewood was purchased by the Ashdale Hotels group in 2008, it has since continued to be a successful wedding venue and hotel.

== Architecture ==
=== House ===
The house is built of magnesian limestone with some concrete, and has roofs of Welsh slate and lead. There are two storeys and a basement, and an approximately H-shaped plan. The south front has 13 bays, consisting of a central range of five bays, flanked by two projecting bays and two recessed bays. It has a chamfered plinth, and an embattled parapet. A flight of steps with a decorative iron balustrade leads up to the central doorway that has Roman Doric columns, a pattered fanlight, a fluted frieze, and a dentilled pediment. The windows are 20th-century casements. At the rear is a tower, and an arcade of blind round arches.

Inside, the great hall has a window which is probably 13th century, and at the rear of the hall is a staircase which is likely to be 14th century. The great hall, drawing room, dining room and staircase hall are decorated in neo-classical style, as are some rooms on the upper floor. The kitchen has remains of an early fireplace in a 17th-century opening, and there is another 17th-century fireplace in the rear kitchen. Several rooms have interiors moved from elsewhere in the 1960s, including the Flemish Panelled Room, with decoration created in the 1670s for the Carmelite Church in Ghent and a fireplace and overmantel from Eaton Old Hall; and probable 16th-century bookcases in the library.

=== St Leonard's Chapel ===
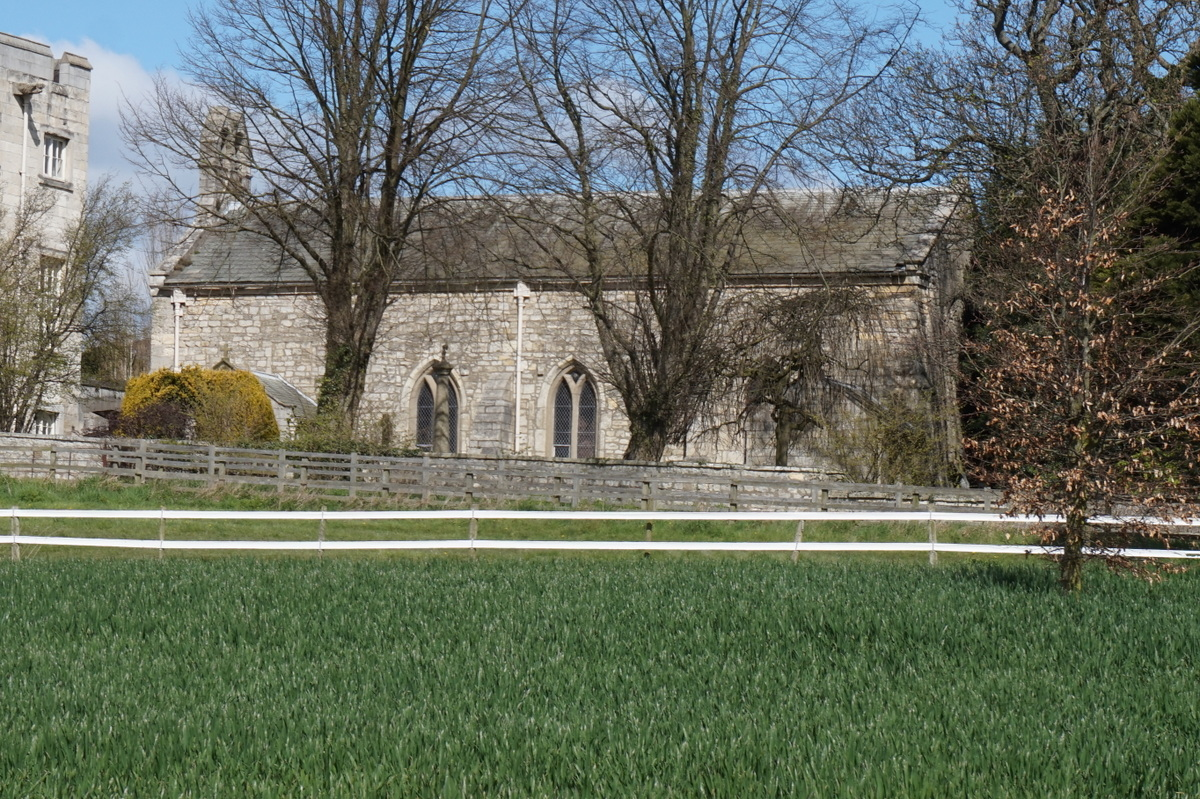
The chapel

The chapel is separately grade I listed and is believed to have been built between 1283 and 1285. It is constructed of magnesian limestone and has a grey slate roof. It consists of a continuous nave and chancel, a south porch, and a south vestry. On the west gable is a twin bellcote, added in 1680. The porch has a chamfered pointed arch with a hood mould, above which is a statue of Saint Leonard. The interior was refurbished in the mid 18th century by John Carr. It has a gallery at the west end, and has a range of monuments including two early 14th-century effigies of knights. There is a 15th-century stone alms box with iron doors, a piscina and stoup with trefoil heads, and a niche for a bell.

=== Groom's House ===
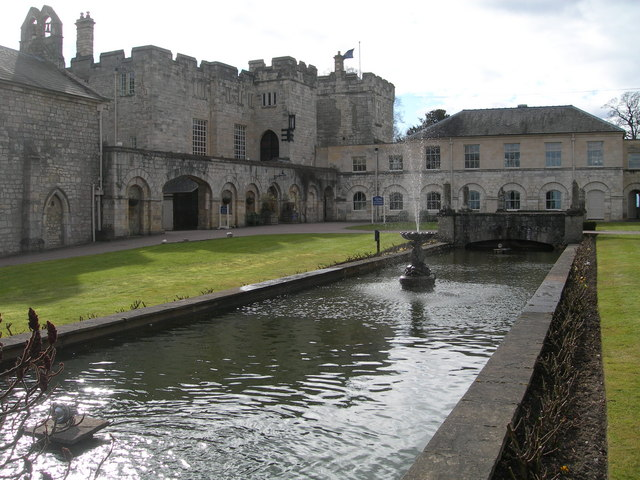
The Groom's House

The Groom's House, stable and wall were built in the mid or late 18th century, and are collectively grade II listed. The buildings are constructed of magnesian limestone with a grey slate roof. The house has two storeys and five bays, a plinth, an impost band, a sill band, an eaves band and a hipped roof. The ground floor has an arcade containing a central doorway and round-headed windows, and on the upper floor are sash windows with flat heads. There are adjoining walls, and on the south side is a Tudor arched carriage entrance.

=== Stable ===
The former stables, later converted into a guest house, were built in the mid or late 18th century, and are also grade II listed, together with an adjoining wall. The building is built of magnesian limestone on a plinth, with a projecting eaves bands, and a hipped Welsh slate roof. There are two storeys and eight bays, the middle four bays projecting under a pediment containing a circular sundial. The second and seventh bays contain flat-headed doorway with patterned fanlights. The windows are sashes, those on the ground floor of the middle four bays with round-arched heads, and the others with flat heads. To the west is a wall containing a round-arched opening within a larger arch with imposts and a cornice.

=== Folly ===
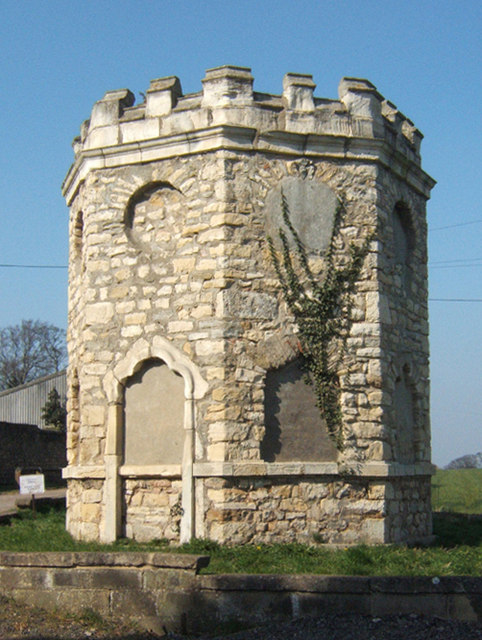
The folly

The grade II-listed late-18th century folly is in magnesian limestone, on a plinth, and it has a continuous sill band, a cornice, and an embattled parapet. There is an octagonal plan, and it contains two doorways, one with a trefoil head and blocked, and the other later with a straight head. Between the doorways are blocked trefoil-headed windows, and above are blind oculi.

== See also ==
- Grade I listed buildings in North Yorkshire (district)
- Listed buildings in Stutton with Hazlewood
