= York Lokomotive =

Rugby league team in North Yorkshire, England

Club information
- Full name: York Lokomotive RLFC
- Colours: Red, and white
- Founded: 2008
- Website: http://www.pitchero.com/clubs/yorklokomotives

Current details
- Ground: Sim Balk Lane Pavilion, Bishopthorpe, York, YO23 2QH
- Competition: Rugby League Conference

York Lokomotive are a rugby league team based in York, North Yorkshire. They play in the Yorkshire Premier division of the Rugby League Conference.

== History ==
York Lokomotive were founded in 2008 as a joint-venture between York Groves rugby league team and the York Railway Institute sporting club. The name of the club was taken from York being one of the biggest railway cities in England. One of the biggest steam railway depots in the UK was based in York and was known as "York Locomotive". The "C" in Locomotive was changed to a "K" to emulate the Russian rugby league club Lokomotiv Moscow.

They joined the Yorkshire division of the Rugby League Conference, Paul McDermott was head coach. They finished in second-place in the league after losing their last game to Scarborough Pirates 30–26 to Bridlington Bulls who prevailed in the Yorkshire division grand final. In 2009, the club were promoted to the newly formed Yorkshire Premier division. Barry Gargan took over as head coach with Paul McDermott moving up to director of coaching. York finished fourth in the league with five wins and five defeats.

During 2010 and 2011, Paul McDermott was re-appointed as head coach improving the club further and winning some impressive games; the most memorable an away win at Cutsyke. In the winter of 2011, the majority of the original committee and Paul McDermott were not able to fully commit to the club and stood down bringing into question the future of the club.

A number of the players had other ideas and the club continued in the Yorkshire men's league. The Lokos had a very difficult 2012 season under the leadership of Liam Watling & Matthew Chapman with some heavy defeats, mainly due to a lack of players as all the other amateur rugby league clubs in the area were now playing summer rugby. The York Lokos did however fulfil all of their 2012 fixtures.

In the off season 2012-2013 an action plan was put in place transferring Matthew Chapman and Liam Watling to the committee with Dean Winspear and Mark Musgrave guided by Simon Moat who chaired the club. This helped provided the Lokos with some superb sponsorship deals and a wealth of players. More than 40 players signed onto the club's books in 2013 with ex-player Jon Hough acting as head coach. Again competing in the Yorkshire men's league the Lokos finished 4th with the highlight being double victories over local rivals Heworth.

In 2015 the club moved from New Lane, which they had shared with York RI, to the Southbank Community Centre, Bustardthorpe, with their games being played on Knavesmire. This was followed in 2017 by a move to Sim Balk Lane, Bishopthorpe.
