= Vavasour Baronets of Hazlewood (1628) =

Escutcheon of the Vavasour Baronets of Hazlewood

The Vavasour Baronetcy, of Hazlewood in the County of York, was created in the Baronetage of England on 24 October 1628 for Thomas Vavasour. (He was the de jure 19th Baron Vavasour but the title had been dormant for centuries since the death of the 2nd Baron.) The title became extinct on the death of the seventh Baronet in 1826.

== Vavasour baronets, of Hazlewood (1628) ==
1st creation

- Sir Thomas Vavasour, 1st Baronet (died before 1636)
- Sir Walter Vavasour, 2nd Baronet (died after 1666)
- Sir Walter Vavasour, 3rd Baronet (c. 1644–1713)
- Sir Walter Vavasour, 4th Baronet (c.1659–1740)
- Sir Walter Vavasour, 5th Baronet (died 1766)
- Sir Walter Vavasour, 6th Baronet (1744–1802)
- Sir Thomas Vavasour, 7th Baronet (c.1745–1826)

== Notes ==
Baronetage of England
Preceded by Slingsby baronets	Vavasour baronets of Hazlewood; 24 October 1628	Succeeded by Wolseley baronets
