= Stutton, North Yorkshire =

Village in North Yorkshire, England

Coordinates: 53°52′03″N 1°16′20″W

Stutton
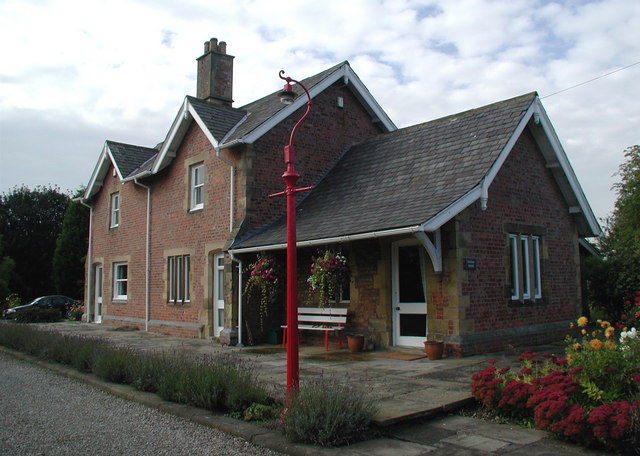
- The old station house at Stutton, now a private home

- Location within North Yorkshire
- Population: 983 (2011 census)
- OS grid reference: SE479414
- Civil parish: Stutton with Hazlewood
- Unitary authority: North Yorkshire
- Ceremonial county: North Yorkshire
- Region: Yorkshire and the Humber
- Country: England
- Sovereign state: United Kingdom
- Post town: TADCASTER
- Postcode district: LS24
- Dialling code: 01937
- Police: North Yorkshire
- Fire: North Yorkshire
- Ambulance: Yorkshire
- UK Parliament: Wetherby and Easingwold

Stutton is a small village in the county of North Yorkshire, England, a mile south-west of Tadcaster.

It lies in the valley of the Cock Beck which discharges into the River Wharfe one mile to the east of the village.

It was part of the West Riding of Yorkshire until 1974. From 1974 to 2023 it was part of the Selby District, it is now administered by the unitary North Yorkshire Council.

It is in the parliamentary constituency of Wetherby and Easingwold, the civil parish of Stutton with Hazlewood and ecclesiastical parish of Tadcaster.

== History ==
It has an ancient history, likely founded by a Viking settler named Stufi in the late 9th century. The Domesday survey of 1086 records a mill, meadow and woodland. It remained a small hamlet until major residential development occurred in the 1960s and the 70s.

From Roman times until 1907/8 a substantial part of the village was owned by the Vavasour family of Hazlewood Castle as part of the Stutton-cum-Hazlewood estate. The castle is now a hotel and spa.

The district close to the village is famous for the milk white magnesium limestone quarried since Roman times and used in the construction of York Minster and much local property. The most famous quarry “Jack Daw” is located 0.5 miles to the west.

Traditionally villagers would make a living working in agriculture on the productive soils which overlie the limestone. The marshy area in the village close to the Cock Beck contained many willow groves and willow harvesting, drying and stripping was a cottage industry until the 1930s. The long straight willow stems were used for basket-making.

=== Railway station ===
A railway line was authorised by Act of Parliament between Harrogate and Church Fenton in July 1845 to the York and North Midland Railway Company, later becoming the North Eastern Railway. The route of the line passed through Stutton and a station and goods siding were built. Construction took place between 1845 and 1847 with the line opening from Church Fenton to Spofforth including Stutton on 10 August 1847 and Harrogate on 20 July 1848.

The station building is two stored, brick with sandstone edging. It was designed by the famous railway architect George Townsend Andrews (1804–1855). Andrews was a close associate of George Hudson the York railway ‘King’ who was a one-time sheriff of York but later disgraced due to fraudulent business practices. Andrews designed many high-quality stations in the north-east and favoured classical and Gothic styles. He was probably also responsible for the cottages at Stutton Crossing, approximately 820 feet (250 m) to the south on Malt Kiln Terrace.

Passenger traffic at Stutton station was never commercially successful due to the small size of the village and proximity to Tadcaster Station. Some effort was made post 1847 in the village to stimulate development and roads were moved and building sized plots laid out but most were not taken. The station closed to passenger traffic on 30 June 1905, although occasional holiday charters continued to call at the station until the 1960s.

Railway staff continued to occupy the building to work the siding, the adjacent level crossing over the road called Weedling Gate and the wooden signal box at the northern end of the station. The signal box was demolished in the late 1960s.

The civil Parish Council of Stutton-cum-Hazlewood met in the waiting room of the building from the 22 May 1908 (and likely before) until 4 February 1960 when it transferred to the then new Stutton Village Hall. The building was also used as the local polling station .

On 4 January 1964, the whole line was closed to passenger traffic and on 2 April 1966 closed to goods traffic and the track lifted as part of the Beeching era railway closures.

In 1970, the British Railways Board put the station building up for sale and, after some time, it was sold and converted into a private house.

=== Amenities ===
In 1900, the village had a water mill, railway station and goods yard, blacksmiths workshop, large purpose built malting building, two shops, C of E mission church (St Aidan's), a public house and a collection of ancient limestone built houses.

Today, the village has a public house, The Hare and Hounds, owned by Samuel Smith Old Brewery, about 70 houses, mostly modern, but with at least 1 dating back to 1697 (Manor House Farm), and a small village hall. St Aidan's was deconsecrated in the early 2000s, and is a private house.

Just southwest of Stutton is Wingate Hill, said to be the site of the Saxon court for the West Riding.

== See also ==
- Listed buildings in Stutton with Hazlewood
