= Sir Geoffrey Vavasour, 5th Baronet =

Irish-born English cricketer

Personal information
- Full name: Geoffrey William Vavasour
- Born: 5 September 1914; Queenstown, Ireland
- Died: 28 July 1997 (aged 82); Wandsworth, London, England
- Batting: Right-handed

Career statistics
Competition	First-class
Matches	1
Runs scored	14
Batting average	7.00
100s/50s	–/–
Top score	8
Catches/stumpings	–/–
- Source: Cricinfo, 3 March 2019

Sir Geoffrey William Vavasour, 5th Baronet DSC (5 September 1914 – 28 July 1997) was an Irish-born English first-class cricketer and Royal Navy officer. He served in the Second World War with distinction, where he was mentioned in dispatches and awarded the Distinguished Service Cross. After the war he played first-class cricket for the Combined Services cricket team. He succeeded his father as the 5th Baronet of Hazelwood in 1961.

== Early life and WWII ==
The son of Sir Leonard Vavasour and his wife, Ellice Margaret Nelson, Vavasour was born at Queenstown, Ireland. He attended the Royal Naval Dartmouth, graduating in September 1935 as a sub-lieutenant. He was promoted to the rank of lieutenant in September 1937. He married his first wife, Joan Millicent Kirkland Robb, in 1940, with the couple having two daughters. He served in the Royal Navy in the Second World War, during which he was mentioned in dispatches in March 1942. He was resident at Rowland's Castle in Hampshire in 1944. Vavasour was awarded the Distinguished Service Cross in April 1944. He was again mentioned in dispatches in May 1944. In the final month of the war he was promoted to the rank of lieutenant commander.

== Post-war and later life ==
Following the war, Vavasour played one first-class cricket match for the Combined Services cricket team against Northamptonshire in 1947 at Northampton. Batting twice in the match, Vavasour was dismissed for 8 runs in the Combined Services first-innings by William Nevell, while in their second-innings he was dismissed by John Timms for 6 runs. He was divorced from his wife in the same year. He was promoted to the rank of lieutenant commander in December 1949. He was promoted to the rank of commander between 1950 and 1958, with Vavasour retiring from active service in February 1958.

Vavasour succeeded his father as the 5th Baronet of Hazelwood in September 1961. He was the director of W M Still & Sons, a kitchen equipment manufacturer, in 1962. He married Marcia Christine Lodge in 1971, with the couple divorcing in 1980. Vavasour died at Wandsworth in July 1997. He was succeeded by his cousin, Eric Vavasour, as the 6th Baronet.

Baronetage of the United Kingdom
Preceded by Leonard Vavasour	Baronet (of Hazlewood); 1961–1997	Succeeded by Eric Vavasour
