= St Paul's Church, Holgate =

Listed church in York, England

St Paul's Church
- The church in 2025
- St Paul's Church
- 53.95397°N 1.09983°W
- OS grid reference: SE 59172 51249
- Location: Holgate Road, Holgate, York
- Country: England
- Denomination: Church of England
- Website: stpaulsyork.org.uk

History
- Status: Active
- Dedication: Paul the Apostle
- Consecrated: 3 January 1856

Architecture
- Heritage designation: Grade II listed
- Architect: J. B. and W. Atkinson
- Style: Gothic Revival
- Groundbreaking: 1850
- Completed: 1851; 175 years ago

Specifications
- Materials: Sandstone, brick

Administration
- Province: York
- Diocese: York
- Archdeaconry: York
- Deanery: York

St Paul's Church is the parish church of Holgate, a suburb of York, England.

The area originally lay within the parish of St Mary Bishophill Junior. Extensive housing was built in Holgate in the 1840s, prompting the decision to construct a new church. A site was chosen on the north side of Holgate Road, and a building in the Gothic Revival style was designed by J. B. and W. Atkinson. It was constructed from 1850 to 1851, with seating for 700 worshippers. The church was consecrated on 3 January 1856 and was granted its own parish later that month. Part of the nave was used to extend the chancel in 1890, and a new east window designed by George Fowler Jones was added in 1906. The church was Grade II listed in 1997.

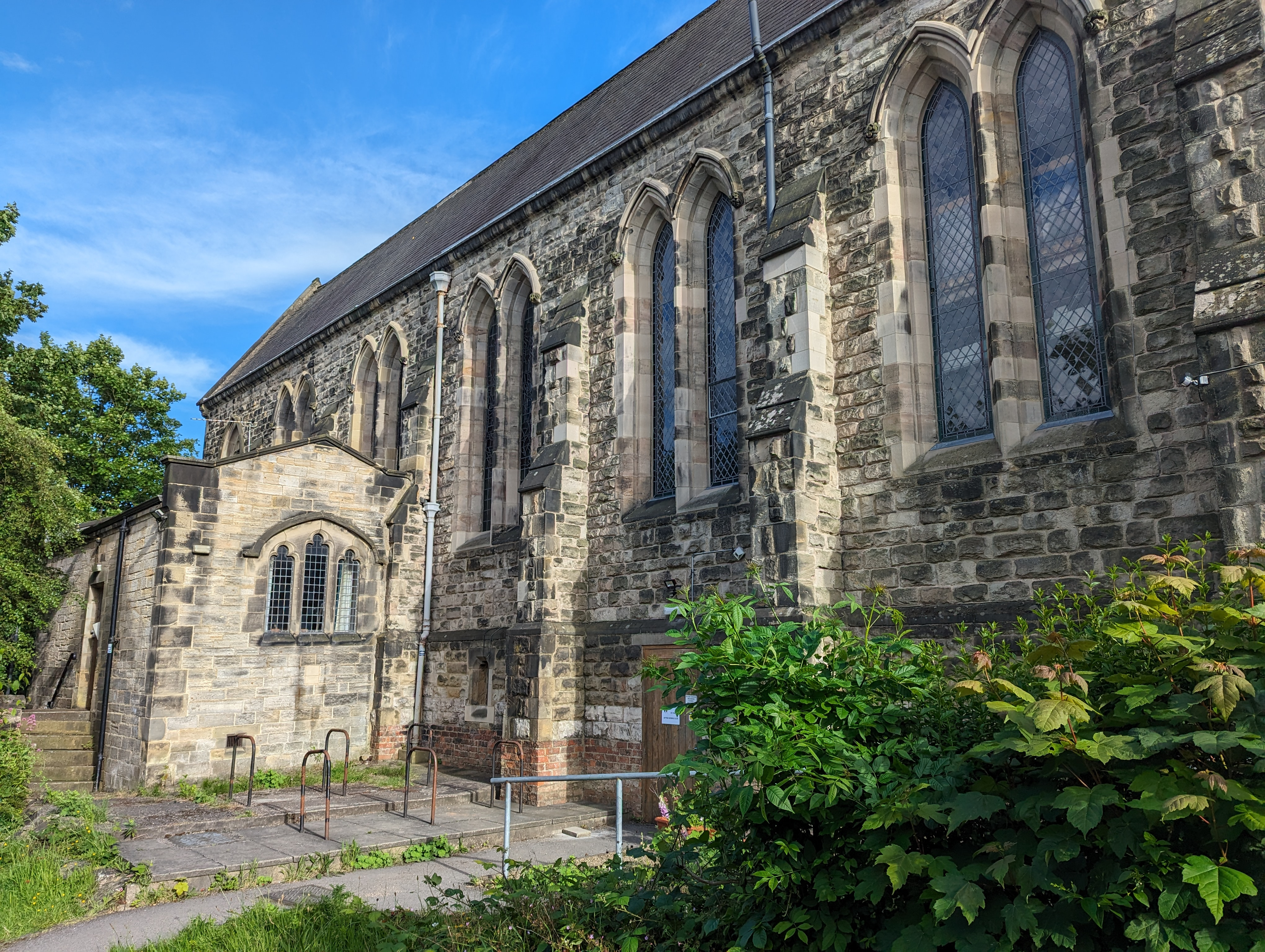
The church from the northwest, in 2024

The church is built of brick faced with sandstone and has a slate roof. The piers are of cast iron. It consists of a continuous nave and chancel with north and south aisles, the nave extending one bay further west than the aisles. The west wall has buttresses and two tall pinnacles; similar pinnacles at the east end have been removed. A bellcote stands at the gable end. The central doorway is flanked by narrow pointed arches, with a large rose window above. The east end has a three-light Geometrical window, while the other windows are lancets. On the north side is a vestry, and there is a basement beneath the north aisle.

Inside, the church has a king-post roof with collar trusses and arched braces. A gallery at the west end has been converted into an office and meeting room.

== See also ==
- Listed buildings in York (outside the city walls, southern part)
