= Public Warning System (Singapore) =

Network of emergency sirens installed around Singapore

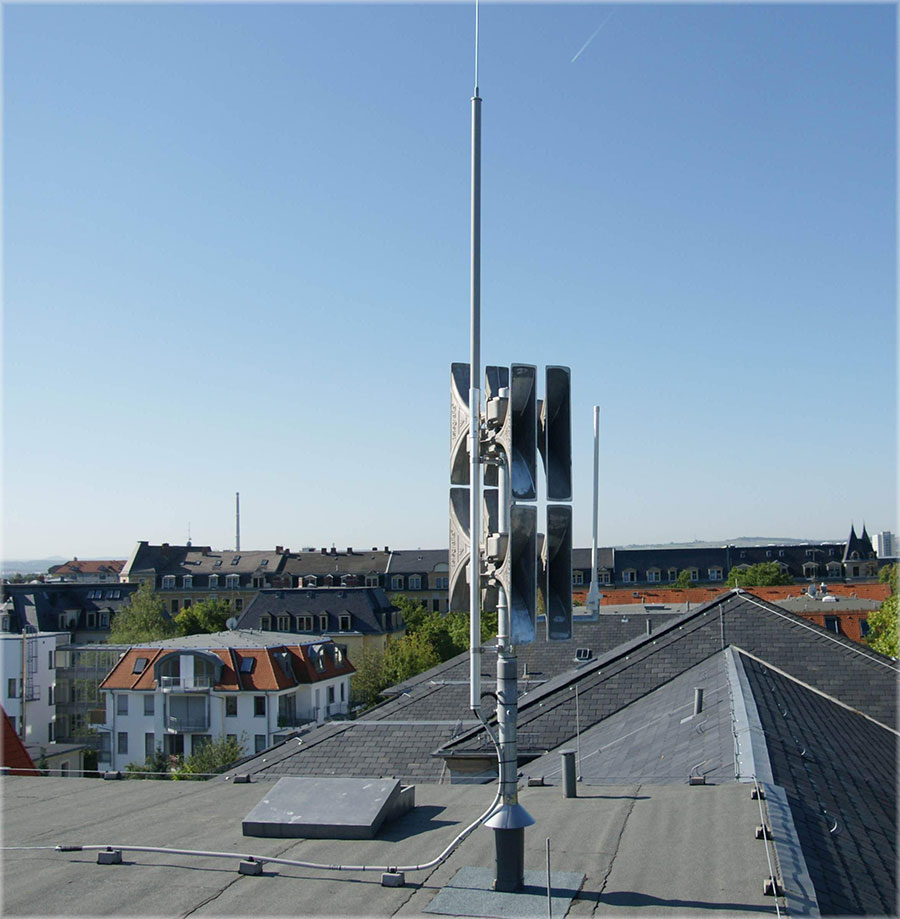
Public warning system, Dresden. Electronic sirens by Telegrafia.

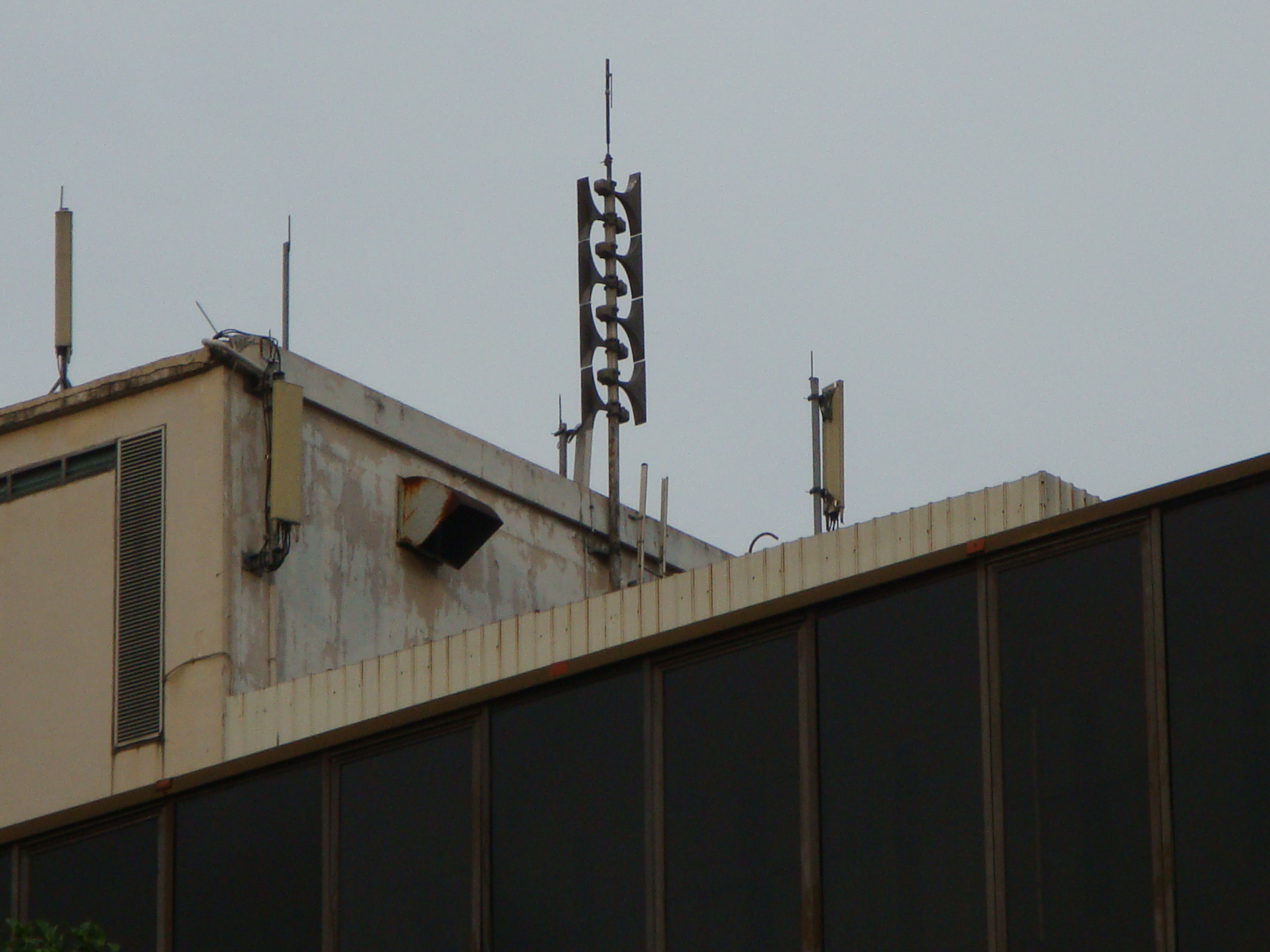
A siren of the Public Warning System.

The Public Warning System (PWS) is a network of civil defense sirens installed by the Singapore Civil Defence Force on over 2,000 strategic points in Singapore to warn Singaporeans of impending dangers, air raids and atomic bomb blasts. Thus far, the siren network has only been used for occasional public awareness drills, monthly noon chimes and for commemorating the island's Total Defence (February 15). Annually, the SCDF sounds the "Important Message" signal through the island-wide network of PWS sirens on 15 February and 15 September at 6:20pm. It was also used to mark a minute's silence nationwide for the passing of former prime minister Lee Kuan Yew on the evening of 23 March 2015 and on 1 and 9 August 2020 to mark the first National Day at home.

== History ==
When it was a British colony, Singapore had mechanically-powered air raid sirens over the island, but the system did not work perfectly and was defunct after World War II. Then, in the 1980s, the SCDF planned a network of powerful electrical sirens throughout Singapore to warn the people of natural disasters and air raids. The first 250 of these sirens were completed by Hörmann Warnsysteme GmbH in 1991 and tested in 1992 in certain parts of Singapore, and by now 284 sirens are installed on rooftops of selected buildings or on the ground if there are no buildings.

In September 1994, SCDF began using softer chimes for its Public Warning System tests. At the same time, it also began testing monthly instead of yearly.

== Types ==
There are a total of four installation types, they can be installed with:

Standard: Eight horns joined together on the left and right sides of a thin medium length steel pole (for buildings with short, medium or no rooftops). This is the original design from 1992 still used today. Also built as on ground sirens in certain areas of Singapore: Yew Tee Industrial Estate, Sungei Kadut, Adam Road Mid-Sub Power Station, Mandai Air Base, an unknown factory in northern Woodlands and on the compounds of Woodlands Fire Station. This configuration is based on the ECN 1200.

Half-size: Four horns joined together on the left right sides of a thin medium length steel pole (for buildings with medium-high rooftops) or a long steel pole (for buildings with high rooftops). First completed in mid-1990s. This configuration is based on the ECN 600.

Double: Double the horns, but not double the decibels of the signals with sixteen horns as standard type and eight horns for half-size. First completed in late 1990s and installed in early to mid-2000s. This configuration is based on the ECN 2400. Also built as an on ground siren (standard sixteen horn type) on the Assumption English School compound a few meters away from the school until it was rebuilt from late 2015 until early 2016 with the siren's current whereabouts unknown.

"Zig-Zag": Four horns joined together in a "zig zag" pattern on both left right sides of a thin short steel pole, this is the default configuration of the ECN 600 completed in 2009 it is currently on the rooftop of Clementi Fire Station.

Sirens attached on appropriate rooftops of buildings can have a custom-made line control unit cabinet (which is white) beside the siren, and to the lower section of on-ground sirens, to eliminate remote control of them from the nearby fire stations turning them into sourcing sirens.

== Signals ==
There are a total of four signals sounded by the sirens, they are:

Alarm signal: Wailing blasts that warn people of a danger or threat and it means for them to move to a SCDF air raid shelter. Used only once on the island's Total Defence Day in 2006. (Sounds similar to the 'Attack' signal in the US)

All clear signal: Continuous blasts of a clear sound to allow the people to move out of the shelter if the threat is over. First used as a tribute to Sir Lee Kuan Yew in 2015 when he died, then twice on August 1 to test the sirens during National Day 2020 at 1033 hrs as pre-parade testing and 2020 hrs and the time at which it was held (8:20pm) was read as 2020 hrs in the 24-hour clock, coinciding with the year 2020. to signal the Pledge Moment and on National Day 2025 at 8:19pm was read as 2019hrs in the 24-hour clock to signal the Majulah Moment for 10 seconds. (Sounds similar to the US' Alert signal)

Important Message signal: Pulsating blasts sounded to alert the people of important messages broadcast by Singapore FM radio stations. This is the most used signal as to celebrate Total Defence and Civil Defence Days in Singapore, sounded at 1205 hrs on these days. However, from Total Defence Day 2015 and 15 September 2018 onwards, this signal was sounded at 1820 hrs instead of 1205 hrs in remembrance of the British surrender of Singapore in World War II on 15 February 1942 at 1820 hrs. In year 2026, the important message signal rang at 1500 hrs instead of 15 Feb to mark a start of Ex Sg Ready 2026.

Testing signal: The test signal is a chime sounded on the 1st day of every month at 1200 hrs (GMT+8:00 SGT). Since 2009, this chime has also been used on National Day on August 9 (and since 2011, on the preview show whose date differs every year) to signal the Pledge Moment when Singaporeans recite the Singapore Pledge and sing the National Anthem. In 2009, it was held at 2022 hours and for 2010 and 2011, it was held at 2010 hrs. 2010's version was known as One Voice 2010 and the time at which it was held (8:10pm) was read as 2010 hrs in the 24-hour clock, coinciding with the year 2010. In 2011 and 2012, it was simply known as the Pledge Moment, and 2012's version was held at about 2000 hrs instead of 2010 hrs in previous years.

== Usage in other countries ==
In 2009, Hörmann Warnsysteme GmbH of Germany uses sirens made for the SCDF in other countries, with their default configuration having its horns attached to front and rear of the pole.

== See also ==
- Cell Broadcast
- Emergency population warning
- Emergency Alert System
- Emergency Public Warning System
- Four-minute warning
- CONELRAD
- UK's National Attack Warning System
- Wartime Broadcasting Service
- Protect and Survive
- Transition To War
- Emergency Broadcast System
- Central Government War Headquarters
- Civil Contingencies Secretariat
- RAF Rudloe Manor
- Corsham Computer Centre
- Continuity of government
- Hack Green Secret Nuclear Bunker
- WGU-20
