= Square Leg =

1980 British civil defence exercise

'Square Leg' target plot

Square Leg was a British government home defence Command Post and field exercise which was held from 11 to 25 September 1980 and which tested the Transition to War and Home Defence roles of the Ministry of Defence and British government. While featuring some conventional warfare elements such as troop mobilisation, much of the exercise involved a mock nuclear attack on Britain; the exercise scenario of 150 nuclear weapons striking Britain, with the majority of these weapons having a yield ranging from 500 kilotons to 3 megatons and a resulting total yield of 280.5 megatons, was felt to be reasonably realistic, but the post-exercise report stated that a total strike in excess of 1,000 megatons would be more likely. An increased ratio of ground bursts to air bursts was depicted to provide all the regional NBC cells with radioactive fallout challenges, with underwater bursts also being depicted. Furthermore, the scenario was altered from official assessments as these were highly classified and many participants did not have the appropriate clearance to see them.

Partial bomb plots were released for England and Wales and for Scotland, but not for Northern Ireland. In the immediate absence of official casualty estimates, Stan Openshaw and Philip Steadman produced an independent estimate of 29 million deaths (53 percent of the population) and 7 million seriously injured (12 percent), with uninjured short-term survivors numbering 19 million (35 percent). (Note: Figures based on a partial bomb plot of 127 strikes (68 groundbursts, 59 airbursts); the Home Office and Ministry of Defence repeatedly refused to provide Openshaw and Steadman with the complete bomb plot.) By 1982, an official estimate was available which gave the following numbers; 8.5 million blast wave deaths, 2.5 million radiation deaths, 2 million severely injured, and 41 million uninjured.

Square Leg was criticised for a number of reasons: the weapons used were exclusively in the high-yield megaton range, with an average of 1.5 Mt per bomb, but a realistic attack based on known Soviet capabilities would have seen mixed weapons yields, including many missile-based warheads in the low-hundred-kiloton range. Also, no targets in Inner London were attacked (for example, Whitehall, the centre of British government), though collateral damage from strikes on Outer London targets and on Potters Bar and Ongar (Note: Near the site of Kelvedon Hatch Sub-Regional Headquarters.) meant that much of the Inner London area was still destroyed; towns such as Eastbourne were hit for no obvious reason. (Note: Duncan Campbell speculated that, since the exercise presumed a prevailing southerly wind at the time of attack, a groundburst strike on Eastbourne would increase the amount of fallout afflicting the rest of South East England, but himself believed that the prospect of deliberately increasing fallout in this way "may be fanciful", whereas strikes on Dungeness offered a more realistic prospect of increased fallout due to that region's nuclear reactors.) All government and military bunkers were assumed to have survived for exercise purposes, although Kelvedon Hatch Sub-Regional Headquarters had difficulty in establishing regional control. The United Kingdom Warning and Monitoring Organisation was not a "live" participant, with the strike data it would have provided instead being pre-recorded and played into the exercise as it proceeded, an aspect that was criticised by participants after the exercise.

The British military's involvement with Square Leg fell under the auspices of the wider "Crusader 80" series of exercises.

The Lothian Regional Council refused to participate in Square Leg, and the exercise came under journalistic scrutiny after its details were leaked to the press, but otherwise, despite providing a "major boost" to the nuclear disarmament movement, it was not met with significant opposition in the way that the later Hard Rock exercise would be.

== Timeline of main events and civil and armed forces actions ==
=== Transition to War ===
The following table shows the hypothetical pre-strike event list drawn from the national Main Event List for Square Leg, testing the Transition to War stage.

Date	Event
January 1980	Warsaw Pact, which has recently come under new leadership, holds military exercises similar to those usually held in the summer. While Pact forces would normally return to base after end of exercise, on this occasion they remain close to NATO's frontier.
April - August 1980	Soviet Union demands that Norway and Denmark withdraw from NATO, sparking diplomatic tension that continues into August. Public reaction is calm as the situation is believed to be just another deterioration in East-West relations.
By early August 1980	NATO commanders declare a state of vigilance in anticipation of war. Reserve forces are mobilised and civil defence planning is initiated at a covert level. "A very few senior key personnel" man SRHQs while County and District authorities begin attack preparations. UKWMO is briefed and begins its own preparations. Planning is not publicly admitted to at this stage in order to avoid public alarm and in order not to precipitate an attack (it is still hoped that a diplomatic solution can be reached).
Prior to and including 15 August	Planning becomes more overt in the continued absence of a diplomatic solution. Major urban centres clear their hospitals of patients and all but a few staff members in order to make way for anticipated casualties, prompting protests from patients and their families, and from local authorities who find themselves facing increased pressure on care home places. Cabinet instructs all departments and specified authorities to review their plans for Transition to War. SRHQs and local authority emergency centres are fully prepared.
16 August	Fuel rationing imposed, leading to queues at petrol stations and police needing to be drafted in to prevent hoarding.
27 August	Government requests preparations to be made to remove art treasures.
31 August	Industrial unrest and large-scale activity by extreme left- and right-wing parties. Resentment is directed at the heavier than usual police presence and the police's role in controlling subversives and potential subversives. Multiple arrests made under emergency powers. Arson attacks on industrial sites, supermarkets, etc. Police require military assistance to quell some of the unrest; they manage to do so without shots being fired.
1 September	Considerable cross-Channel movement into the UK by expatriate families on a self-evacuation basis.
7 September	Prime Minister addresses nation via TV and radio.
9 September	Secretary of State authorises power of direction over British Airways and national shipping.
11 September	Prime Minister again addresses nation.
12 September	Protect and Survive instructions, which were already available at libraries and HMSO in pamphlet form, are issued through the media. Those who intend to follow instructions begin doing so. Cabinet approves Queen's Order 2, effectively dissolving Parliament and granting emergency powers to the government. Directed food buying (by government departments, police, and military services, etc.), accompanied by panic buying breaking out in some areas and subsequent price rises. Noticeable rundown of industry. Key points (Note: Buffer depots and other food supplies, military bases, fuel depots, power stations, major industrial sites, government facilities, and so on.) placed under guard. Essential Service Routes designated and closed off to the general public; few local authorities have dedicated plans, with others either repurposing existing plans or acting in a completely improvised manner. Between ten and thirty per cent of persons in perceived target areas ignore advice to stay at home and instead self-evacuate, causing further difficulties for local authorities who are under no obligation to assist such evacuees (though some do). Local authorities, MPs, police, and the services swamped with offers of help in forming some sort of civil defence/Home Guard organisation. Local authority attitudes vary; many turn down offers of civilian help despite government encouragement to use such help, while some others take on civilians with relevant skills in order to make up for staff desertions.
13 September	Prime Minister speaks to nation for a third time. Panic food buying continues.
15 September	General Alert and war declared. Fighting breaks out on continent. Conventional bombing on defence related targets in UK. Public reaction to bombing is mixed - those living in high-rise flats and in areas generally thought to be obvious targets leave home quickly. Industry seriously affected. Schools close in afternoon.
17 September	Fighting on continent escalates. Government authorises local authorities to staff their wartime headquarters. Public passenger transport operating at fifty per cent of capacity. Government orders manning of headquarters in the Regions.
19 September	Satellites and RAF Fylingdales detect incoming nuclear attack. Attack Warning Red 11.55 am. Nuclear strike starts at 12.01 pm and ends at 12.10 pm. Strike mainly hits military and communications targets, though civilian areas are also targeted. Loss of RAF Fylingdales and other communication difficulties caused by the first strike mean that no warning can be provided when a second strike begins. This strike starts at 13.00 and sporadically "drift[s] in" until 15.00, and targets population centres and industrial sites along with some repeat strikes on first wave targets.

=== Survival ===
The following table of Square Leg's 'survival' period, detailing the events that occurred in the first two weeks following the attack, is extracted from the Warwickshire County War Diary.

Date	Event
20 September	Daily food requirements - 680,700 rations. Eighteen thousand people (in refugee camps) suffering third-degree burns. Isolated reports of refugees leaving West Midlands area.
22 September	Casualty aid points swamped. Hospitals and improvised hospitals full. Decision taken to conserve police strength with a view to deployment of Police Support Units later.
23 September	Commence mass advice to achieve public order. Reappraise triage. Request medical aid from military.
24 September	Establish additional casualty aid points close to existing where possible. Commit to home nursing casualties who will probably die. Commence grave-digging operations. (Transport) Remove dead from casualty aid points; remove dead from damaged areas as radiation levels permit. Fire situation in county under control.
25 September	Identify rationing levels of food and water. Identify additional rationing requirements of workers. Flow of refugees from the West Midlands is indicated; 31,000 to North Warwickshire, 12,000 to South Warwickshire.
27 September	Casualty figures Rugby area is indicated 30,000 plus estimate, Nuneaton area 17,000 plus. Large numbers of persons suffering first stages of radiation sickness. Arrange for establishment of decontamination units. Consider variations to law - liaise with police.
28 September	Estimate 100,000 plus refugees coming from West Midlands - most injured/shocked/irradiated. Consider disinfection in Rugby/Coventry area to avert disease. Liaise with military for aircraft for spraying. Control of refugees in the west of the county impossible at this date. (Via Wartime Broadcasting System) advise public on measures being taken to alleviate rioting and looting. Produce advice to encourage 'Good Neighbourly' behaviour towards refugees. Advise public with regard to disposal of dead bodies. Advise populace not to leave their areas.
29 September	Numbers increasing at casualty aid points, priority being given to savable under-thirties. Anticipate refugee figures to be 200,000 plus. Further requests to Sub-Regional HQ for additional food; SRHQ directive received - conserve food.
30 September	Arrange collection of food from Buffer Depots. Liaise with police and military for convoy guards. Food to be held and guarded in district stores. Deaths becoming a serious problem, liaise with transport and works for speedier removal of bodies from casualty aid points. Advise public on action to be taken re looting - particularly theft of food. Call for volunteers to assist with transport and works tasks.
1 October	Notification from SRHQ; twenty-five per cent of food requirements for refugees to come from local Buffer Depots. Police Support Units established and deployed to areas where refugees are known to be located. Consider establishment of interim police controls in known trouble areas.
2 October	Feeding to commence at 1800 hrs. Calorific content of meals will be six hundred + one pint of water (non-workers), 800 + two pints of water (workers). Meals provided for infant feeding totally inadequate, request additional supplies. Known casualty figures 37,000; seriously injured 67,000. Radiation sickness entering third stage. Disease control absolute priority. All Essential Service Routes cleared. Identify and prepare additional burial resources. Advise public on location and times Feeding Centres will be open, safe routes to them (and) emphasize subsistence level of feeding in operation.

Police and military tasks during this and the Recovery period were set out as follows:

- "Maintenance of law and order - greatest problem [in] urban areas"
- "Control of selfish and disgruntled minorities"
- "Support and protect special courts"
- "Execution of sentences" (military only)
- "Key points protection and reinforcement"
- "Protection of convoys"
- "Guards for controls"
- "Personal protection for VIPs"
- "Subjugation and elimination of hostile elements"
- "Control of weapons"
- "Bomb disposal" (military only)
- "Supervision and control of operations involving the use of explosives, e.g. demolitions"
- "Guards on internment areas"
- "Assisting in control at communal feeding centres"
- "Enforcement of controls to prevent the spread of disease"
- "Manning any pre-planned pattern of military stations and posts"
- "Maintenance and control of Essential Service Routes"
- "Control of movement"
- Tasks regarding the training of new personnel "to compensate for wastage"
- Reconnaissance tasks
- Advisory tasks

=== Recovery ===
The 'recovery' period reports are drawn from the Gloucestershire County War Diary's log of requests for military support.

Date	Request to military staff	Response
3 October	Request for air reconnaissance at Little Rissington food depot.	No response.
3 October	Provide armed troops to assist police at ten locations on M5 Motorway.	Thirty men deployed.
3 October	Provide coils of barbed wire.	Barbed wire requested.
3 October	Provide armed troops to assist troops at Gloucester to: (a) quell disturbance involving eight thousand persons. (b) guard a food warehouse at Hare Lane.	(a) Twenty-five troops sent. (b) Twenty-five troops despatched.
3 October	Provide ambulances, trained first aid personnel and medical supplies.	No ambulances, trained first aid personnel or medical supplies available. Some vehicles and drivers only.
3 October	Provide armed troops to assist police with law and order problems at Cirencester, Cinderford, Lydney and Newnham.	Thirty armed men made available for Cirencester. Due to radiation hazard, (it is) not considered effective to send armed parties into other areas at this time.
3 October	Provide armed guards to secure [Ministry of Agriculture, Fisheries and Food] warehouse.	County Military HQ requested [Armed Forces HQ] 7 (Note: Described in War Plan UK as likely being located in Taunton.)to provide assistance from east of county due to radiation levels.
4 October	Provide assistance to police at Gloucester to deal with law and order problem.	Fifteen men from Hare Lane detailed for this task.
4 October	Secure and guard a food warehouse at Cirencester.	Twenty armed men despatched from Innsworth at 0930 hrs.
4 October	Provide guards at twelve food supply and cooking centres throughout the country (sic, most likely meant to be county instead). Provide escorts on ten food supply vehicles.	Five armed guards provided at each location. Two armed guards provided for each vehicle.
4 October	Assist police to prevent hostile crowd gaining access to Gloucester District Wartime HQ.	Twenty armed men made available.
4 October	Assist police at GCHQ (Government Communications Headquarters in Cheltenham) which is under attack by looters and refugees.	Two mechanized platoons despatched at 1400 hrs.
4 October	Accommodate five thousand homeless at RAF Innsworth.	Cannot accommodate at RAF Innsworth but could take four thousand two hundred at RAF Quedgely (sic). Vehicles available at Aschurch (sic), but no drivers or fuel.
4 October	Provide hygiene and sanitation teams and equipment at Cheltenham. Provide rodenticides and disinfectants.	Unable to assist.
4 October	Provide security patrols and barbed wire at Special Rest Centre at Stroud for suspected disease-carrying refugees.	Two platoons despatched to Stroud. No stocks of barbed wire available.
4 October	Provide assistance to Ministry of Agriculture officers who have been prevented by hostile crowd from arranging the despatch of food from a market garden.	1630hrs. Wessex helicopter and twelve soldiers sent to scene.

== See also ==
- Nuclear weapons and the United Kingdom
- World War III
- The Warsaw Pact operation Seven Days to the River Rhine
- RAF Greenham Common airfield
- United Kingdom Warning and Monitoring Organisation
