= Transition to war =

NATO term for a period of international tension leading to open war

Transition to war (TTW) is a NATO military term referring to a period of international tension during which government and society move to an open (but not necessarily declared) war footing. The period after this is considered to be war, conventional or otherwise, but the term TTW found its origins in the peak of the Cold War as a key NATO concept within the tripwire escalation of the DEFCON status. This could include the suspension of peacetime services, closing motorways to all but military traffic and the internment of subversives without charge or trial. The Federal Emergency Management Agency would declare this period as Increased Readiness in a move to expedite Civil Defense training, among other things in order to prepare civil authorities for a nuclear attack, and to an extent is similar to Transition to War.

== Legal framework in the United Kingdom ==
=== Emergency legislation ===
The legislation that facilitates the transition to war is pre-drafted and has been in existence since the 1930s, when World War II required certain legislation to be passed to prosecute the war effectively. This mostly included the Emergency Powers (Defence) Act 1939 and the controversial Defence Regulation 18B, which allowed the detention of subversives without charge or trial. A number of these emergency regulations lasted until the mid-1950s, and were finally abolished with the end of rationing in 1954.

However the Cold War brought the possibility of war with the Soviet Union, which would require similar legislation to allow NATO countries to defend themselves effectively. Hence pre-drafted legislation governing every aspect of life in the United Kingdom, consisting of the Emergency Powers (Defence) Bill, Defence (Machinery of Government) Regulations and other laws were devised. Other regulations included:

- The Defence (Public Safety) Regulations that allowed for such things as the prevention of interference with essential services and the control of newspapers and other means of communication. This could mean postal and press censorship, among other things.
- The Defence (Essential Supplies, Works and Services) Regulations that would give the power to control all land and property, industry and transport. This could entail the closing motorways to all but military traffic, restricting key workers from leaving their posts, commandeering buildings, commandeering of British Airways, etc.
- The Defence (Public Safety and Order) Regulations that were concerned with such matters as public shelter, the control of lighting and sound and the restriction of the public electricity supply. Electricity could be restricted for advertising and display purposes, blackout regulations could be implemented, extra control of BBC, ITV and Independent Local Radio and the commandeering of houses and schools for public feeding centres or even detention camps. Sus law could be reinstated or more tightly enforced to prevent sabotage.
- The Defence (Births, Marriages and Deaths) Regulations.
- The Defence (Cash) Regulations which were intended to restrict the amount of money that could be taken out of bank and building society accounts at any one time, which is intended to prevent a currency crisis and keep supplies of money secure.

Other existing legislation governing everyday matters already allows for special provisions in a national emergency. For example, the Energy Act 1976 allows the Secretary of State to create regulations governing the production, distribution and use of coal, petrol, diesel, gas, biofuels and electricity in a crisis. For example, it could allow rationing, power cuts in certain areas to allow blackouts near key installations, restrictions on civilian use of cars and the like.

The Broadcasting Act 1980 allows the governments to take over editorial control of the BBC, ITV, Independent Local Radio and Independent National Radio in a national emergency.

The Railways Act 1976 has similar provisions with regard to the British railway system. The minister or Secretary of State can take control of the railways in the event of war, including the Channel Tunnel.

=== Implementation of emergency legislation ===
Since this legislation is pre-drafted, it would be either rushed through Parliament or be done through an Order in Council, which is essentially a royal decree. The bills themselves would be enacted in three stages. The first stage would be a covert review of what to do and what needed to be revised, done only by ministers and civil servants. The second stage would be more overt and would include 24-hour manning of government departments, people being briefed of their wartime roles, testing of sirens and other communication systems, cancelling police leave and mobilising the armed forces (including reservists). The third and final stage would be the activation of war measures, such as local councils setting up refugee centres and the like.

The actual bills would effectively be enabling acts allowing for the implementation of the pre-drafted legislation. The bills' content was not divulged both on the grounds of national security and because it would be politically controversial for the party in charge at that time to do so considering their draconian nature.

The first bill, the Special Powers Bill, gave the police extra powers to stop, search and arrest people, restrictions on ships and aircrew, along with compensation.

The second, The Readiness Bill, covered the requisitioning of private property (including land, buildings, vehicles, ships and aircraft), preventing key workers from leaving their employment, widening the role of the armed forces and fire brigades, reorganising the National Health Service, control of transport, extra police powers, regulation of money supply and currency controls and compensation.

The General Bill would be the third and final stage of putting Britain on a war footing. While building on the other two, it would also provide the legal framework for regional government (national government could fail), including the powers of the regional commissioner. Along with this would be the power to take over the BBC (which already exists), control labour, the registration of births, deaths and marriages, the administration of justice (jury trials may be suspended and special courts of justice may be established, for example. Also, subversives could be arrested by police and detained without charge or trial) and compensation.

When these were drafted, it was assumed that both the House of Commons and the House of Lords were sitting at the time of the crisis and become acts within a few hours or days (the bills were not enacted in advance partly due to their being too "fierce" for a peacetime parliament to approve and partly since it was felt that any attempt to enact them anyway would amount to a current parliament determining the affairs of its successors, something that is not possible under the British doctrine of parliamentary sovereignty), though it would be more problematic if Parliament was in recess, as it would take longer to enact the acts. The new legislation would have to be publicised and printed within two days.

=== Post-Cold War era ===
With the end of the Cold War in the late 1980s and early 1990s, the Northern Ireland Peace Process and the Human Rights Act 1998 passing into law, these emergency powers and the legal framework that supported them became dated and needed re-examining. The Civil Contingencies Act 2004 was introduced to provide a new enabling power to introduce emergency regulations, but it cannot be used by the Government to alter the Human Rights Act 1998.

== Possible transition to war actions ==
The following table gives examples of what could happen in a state of emergency and a transition to a war footing in the UK, and why, but these may not necessarily happen in the order listed or at all.

| Number | Example of transition to war | Reasons | Notes |
|---|---|---|---|
| 1 | Closure of schools, colleges and universities | Reduce civilian casualties, allow teachers and other staff in reserve forces (Note: To include the Territorial Army, Royal Naval Reserve, Royal Air Force Volunteer Reserve, Royal Marines Reserve, retained firefighters and the Special Constabulary. Groups like the RNLI, the Salvation Army and the WRVS are charitable organisations but are pressed into service to supplement the civil defence, the armed forces and post-attack distribution of aid.) to mobilise and free up buildings for emergency uses. Teaching and other staff may be assigned other duties. | Could be problematic in certain areas, especially in garrison towns or during the exam season. Some universities, such as Oxford and Cambridge, could be possible ideological or strategic targets. |
| 2 | Hospitals being cleared | Make room for casualties from the front line and allow reservists to mobilise | Hospitals, the fire brigade and other emergency services could be overstretched after conventional or terrorist attack, if they still exist. Fewer medical staff, due to reserves mobilisation. Cold War-era planning intended emptied hospitals to be used for US casualties as well as British ones. |
| 3 | Motorways closed to civilian traffic | Facilitate movement of troops, food, fuel, ammunition, weapons and essential supplies | Motorways and rail network could have people trying to get away from target areas or leave the country; some railway lines and roads could be potential targets. |
| 4 | Normal television and radio broadcasts suspended (or programmes cancelled, changed or interrupted). For example, weather forecasts and TV/radio shows are suspended. | To warn of attack, give official information and free up labour for war effort. In the case of the cancellation of weather forecasts, this could also be to prevent spies and terrorists getting information on when to attack. Protect and Survive public information films may be broadcast. The Wartime Broadcasting Service may be activated, with other radio stations not broadcasting. | Could be detrimental to morale if a popular show was pulled, broadcasting of Protect and Survive PIFs could backfire and people ignore or switch off official broadcasts. Government also has powers to take control of the BBC in an emergency under the BBC Charter and Broadcasting Act 1980. |
| 5 | Non-essential telephone lines disconnected, the Government Telephone Preference Scheme is activated. | Increased demand from government and other agencies overwhelms network, but also prevents spies listening in. | Could be unpopular with public because of people losing business or not being able to stay in touch with friends and relatives. |
| 6 | Known and potential subversives interned without charge or trial. Some civil rights could be suspended as the result of Parliament passing an Emergency Powers Act (e.g. Defense of the Realm Act 1914) | To prevent sabotage, mutiny and allow prosecution of the war | Could be used to crack down on civil liberties and stifle dissent in a dictatorship. Civil liberties groups would be very critical of such a decision, as it will stifle opposition due to certain civil rights being suspended. This legislation is already pre-drafted in three stages and could be imposed by an Order in Council, without Parliament's input or approval. |
| 7 | Restrictions on electricity for advertising and display. Government may order sports stadiums, theatres, cinemas, art galleries and certain premises to close as a result. | Reduce detection by enemy bombers, reducing targeting opportunities. Could also be done to provide electricity for the war effort. This is also ostensibly to reduce civilian casualties and provide emergency premises when needed for detention camps or other uses. | Could be done in conjunction with the closure of theaters, cinemas, sport and arts venues (museums, art galleries, etc.). |
| 8 | Government commandeers commercial and private aircraft, ferries, other shipping, British Airways, and the Channel Tunnel. Normal railway services are suspended and trains commandeered, buses and coaches requisitioned. | To get soldiers and equipment to the front line and evacuate families of servicemen. Railways could be used to transport civilian needs as well as heavy artillery and tanks, for instance. Buses could be used as ambulances and troop carriers. | Will leave passengers stranded and lead to food shortages. Businesses could lose trade as a result. Ports and airports may be closed to civilian flights or shipping, either as possible targets or due to military aircraft stationed there. The Railways Act 1976 allows the secretary of state to take control of railways in a national emergency, including war. |
| 9 | Absenteeism in many companies and workplaces. | This may come about due to transport difficulties, reservists called up to fight, wish to be with family and friends or leaving potential target areas (especially in garrison towns, ports and major industrial centres). Some people may be conscripted to work battalions as cargo handlers, mechanics or linguists. | Government may impose manpower controls and industrial conscription, though these may be impractical to enforce. Some people could be in reserved occupations, such as farmers or employees of government contractors. Others could be assigned to a work detail such as a cargo handler at an airbase or a code breaker. |
| 10 | Police leave cancelled. | To enforce emergency laws, guard key points from Buckingham Palace down to local petrol stations from sabotage and attack by terrorists, help in the round-up of subversives | Special constables may be used as well, having to leave their regular jobs and report for duty. This could lead to staff shortages and absenteeism in many workplaces. Traffic wardens, security guards, private detectives, closed-circuit-television operators and private security companies could be pressed into service to assist police by being given police powers. |
| 11 | Press reporting restrictions are imposed, along with postal censorship. | 1. To control the flow and content of information so that spies do not intercept important intelligence.; 2. Keep up morale on home front, as casualty reports would be detrimental to campaign's public support.; 3. So that official information gets through clearly | Foreign journalists could be expelled as possible enemy spies or propagandists. The 1975 BBC War Book claimed that the government "do not intend to impose any censorship during the warning period; nor have any arrangements been made for censorship in war"; any control of the press would rest purely on "voluntary co-operation". |
| 12 | Fire engines and ambulances are deployed outside of towns and cities. | To prevent loss of appliances and crews in the event of an attack | Could leave areas vulnerable to terrorist attack or, in the event of a conventional one, could effectively leave areas with no medical or firefighting help. Firefighting and rescue efforts would be impossible if the war should go nuclear. |
| 13 | Borders, ports and airports are closed to the public. | Heathrow, Gatwick, Southampton, Dover, etc. are potential targets. They may also be commandeered to get troops to the front line or evacuate foreign nationals. | Refugees arriving at ports would be a cover for special forces to infiltrate. Republic of Ireland would also have a refugee problem from people crossing the Border. |
| 14 | Noted artworks taken into storage | 1. To prevent looting by enemy soldiers in the event of an invasion 2. Prevent the loss of artworks in the event of air attack 3. To censor artworks that could be seen as enemy propaganda, even if their artistic merit is notable. | Museums and art galleries may be ordered to close, reducing risk of civilian casualties and free up labour and buildings for other purposes, such as feeding centres, detention camps or accommodation for work details. |
| 15 | Gas, electricity and water supplies disconnected. Petrol and diesel supplies rationed. | 1. Prevent sabotage 2. Divert supplies to war effort as well as civil authorities 3. Prevent fires, water supplies being poisoned, damage to distribution networks 4. Ensure supply and distribution. | Could be a reason for dissent, especially if war comes in winter. More likely that petrol stations will be closed by the simple method of taking the keys and throwing the master switch. Under the Energy Act 1976, the government has the right to release British Gas and the electricity boards from supplying gas and electricity. |

The pre-strike event list for Square Leg featured the following simulated timeline of transition to war actions:

| Date | Event |
|---|---|
| Early August 1980 (Following several months of unresolved East-West tensions) | NATO commanders declare a state of vigilance in anticipation of war. Reserve forces are mobilised and civil defence planning is initiated at a covert level. "A very few senior key personnel" man SRHQs while County and District authorities begin attack preparations. UKWMO is briefed and begins its own preparations. Planning is not publicly admitted to at this stage in order to avoid public alarm and in order not to precipitate an attack (it is still hoped that a diplomatic solution can be reached). |
| Prior to and including 15 August | Planning becomes more overt in the continued absence of a diplomatic solution. Major urban centres clear their hospitals of patients and all but a few staff members in order to make way for anticipated casualties, prompting protests from patients and their families, and from local authorities who find themselves facing increased pressure on care home places. Cabinet instructs all departments and specified authorities to review their plans for Transition to War. SRHQs and local authority emergency centres are fully prepared. |
| 16 August | Fuel rationing imposed, leading to queues at petrol stations and police needing to be drafted in to prevent hoarding. |
| 27 August | Government requests preparations to be made to remove art treasures. |
| 31 August | Industrial unrest and large-scale activity by extreme left- and right-wing parties. Resentment is directed at the heavier than usual police presence and the police's role in controlling subversives and potential subversives. Multiple arrests made under emergency powers. Arson attacks on industrial sites, supermarkets, etc. Police require military assistance to quell some of the unrest; they manage to do so without shots being fired. |
| 1 September | Considerable cross-Channel movement into the UK by expatriate families on a self-evacuation basis. |
| 7 September | Prime Minister addresses nation via TV and radio. |
| 9 September | Secretary of State authorises power of direction over British Airways and national shipping. |
| 11 September | Prime Minister again addresses nation. |
| 12 September | Protect and Survive instructions, which were already available at libraries and HMSO in pamphlet form, are issued through the media. Those who intend to follow instructions begin doing so. Cabinet approves Queen's Order 2, effectively dissolving Parliament and granting emergency powers to the government. Directed food buying (by government departments, police, and military services, etc.), accompanied by panic buying breaking out in some areas and subsequent price rises. Noticeable rundown of industry. Key points (Note: Buffer depots and other food supplies, military bases, fuel depots, power stations, major industrial sites, government facilities, and so on.) placed under guard. Essential Service Routes designated and closed off to the general public; few local authorities have dedicated plans, with others either repurposing existing plans or acting in a completely improvised manner. Between ten and thirty per cent of persons in perceived target areas ignore advice to stay at home and instead self-evacuate, causing further difficulties for local authorities who are under no obligation to assist such evacuees (though some do). Local authorities, MPs, police, and the services swamped with offers of help in forming some sort of civil defence/Home Guard organisation. Local authority attitudes vary; many turn down offers of civilian help despite government encouragement to use such help, while some others take on civilians with relevant skills in order to make up for staff desertions. |
| 13 September | Prime Minister speaks to nation for a third time. Panic food buying continues. |
| 15 September | General Alert and war declared. Fighting breaks out on continent. Conventional bombing on defence related targets in UK. Public reaction to bombing is mixed - those living in high-rise flats and in areas generally thought to be obvious targets leave home quickly. Industry seriously affected. Schools close in afternoon. |
| 17 September | Fighting on continent escalates. Government authorises local authorities to staff their wartime headquarters. Public passenger transport operating at fifty per cent of capacity. Government orders manning of headquarters in the Regions. (No further events recorded prior to the nuclear strike of 19 September) |

A similar sequence was part of the pre-strike scenario for the cancelled Hard Rock exercise, but with some differences; for instance, the closure of schools began at a much earlier stage, the release of Protect and Survive advice was phased (newspaper inserts were published first, followed by a radio and television campaign), and the clearance of hospitals happened at a point where conventional warfighting was already in progress. The Hard Rock scenario additionally had prisons being cleared of all but a thousand inmates, with this step also being taken in the middle of conventional warfighting.

== See also ==
- Protect and Survive
- Civil Defence Information Bulletin, a precursor to Protect and Survive
- Emergency Broadcast System
- Emergency Alert System
- CONELRAD
- HANDEL
- Wartime Broadcasting Service - a broadcasting service run by the BBC that would operate after a nuclear attack or if conventional bombing had destroyed conventional broadcasting systems.
- Four-minute warning
- Threads (1984 film) - a 1984 BBC docudrama which simulates a transition to war
