= Four-minute warning =

1953–1992 British nuclear public alert system

The four-minute warning was a public alert system conceived by the British Government during the Cold War and operated between 1953 and 1992. The name derived from the approximate length of time from the point at which a Soviet nuclear missile attack against the United Kingdom could be confirmed and the impact of those missiles on their targets.

== The warning system ==
=== Basic details ===
The warning would be initiated by the detection of inbound missiles and aircraft targeted at the United Kingdom. Early in the Cold War, Jodrell Bank was used to detect and track incoming missiles, while continuing to be used for astronomical research.

Throughout the Cold War, there was a conflict between the Royal Air Force and the Home Office about who was in charge of the warning system. This was not for any practical or technical reason but more to do with who would be blamed if a false alarm were given or if an attack occurred without warning. By the 1980s, the warning was to be given on the orders of a Warning Officer from the Home Office's Warning and Monitoring Organisation stationed at RAF Booker near High Wycombe.

From the early 1960s, initial detection of attack would be provided primarily by the RAF BMEWS station at Fylingdales in North Yorkshire. There, powerful radar would track the inbound missiles and allow confirmation of targets. In later years the first indication of any imminent attack would be expected to come from infrared detectors aboard the United States Defense Support Program (DSP) satellites. BMEWS would still play an important role in tracking and confirming the destination of any launches.

The British government was not the main beneficiary of BMEWS, given that it would only receive what Solly Zuckerman described in 1960 as "no more than five minutes warning time" of an attack. The United States was the United Kingdom's most important military and technological partner, and its US-based Strategic Air Command would have thirty minutes warning from the Fylingdales station, whilst the RAF's own V bomber force would have about ten minutes. A 1977 Home Office manual for scientific advisers stated that, while "[n]o particular warning time can be guaranteed", a minimum of three minutes' warning was to be expected.

=== UKWMO ===
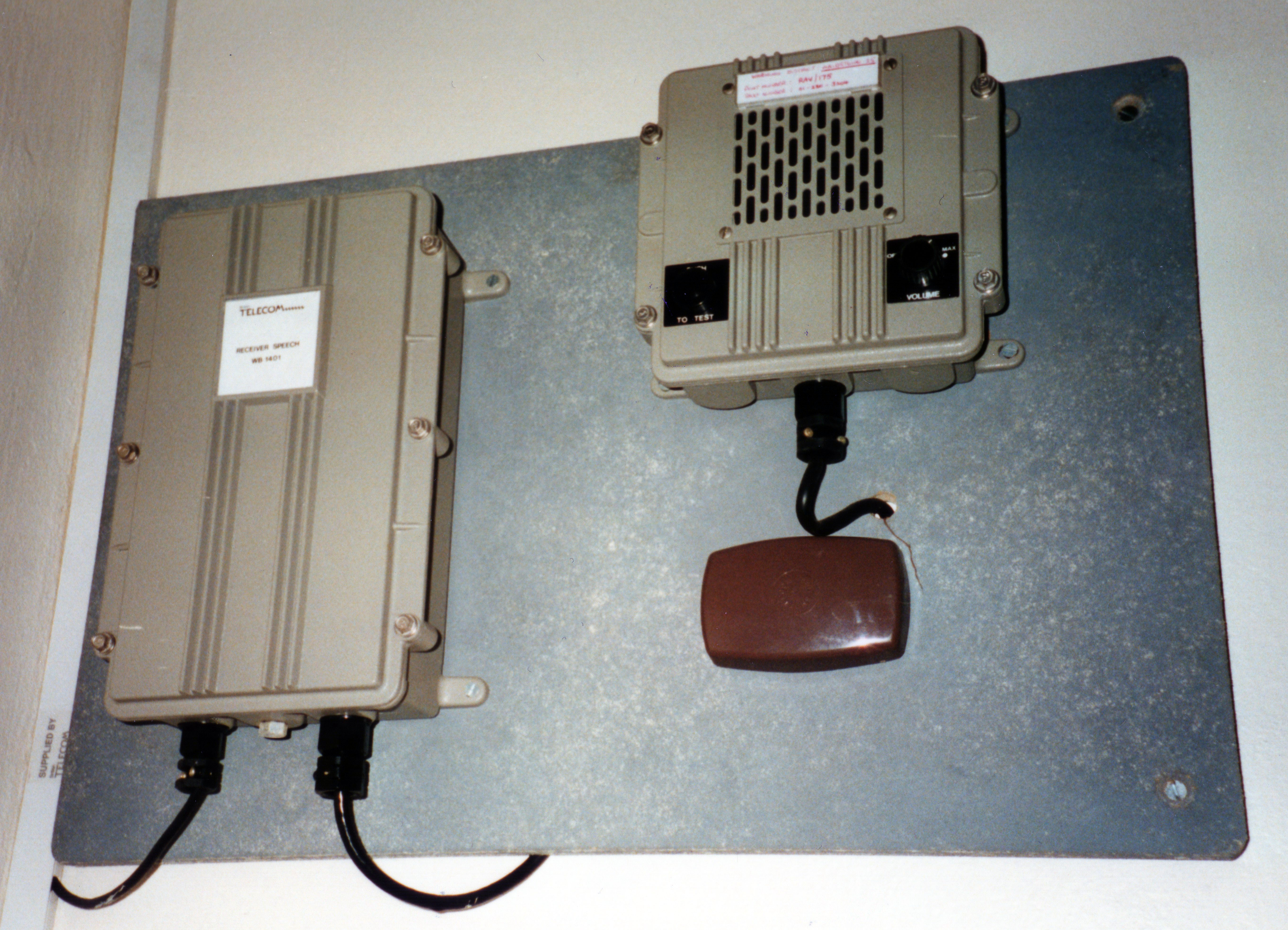
WB1401 warning receiver

It was the responsibility of the United Kingdom Warning and Monitoring Organisation (UKWMO) at the United Kingdom Regional Air Operations Centre (UK RAOC) located at RAF Booker to alert the nation to an imminent air attack. Once an alert was initiated the national and local television and radio networks would break into transmissions and broadcast a warning (the warning message would originate from an emergency studio in BBC Broadcasting House in London). Simultaneously the national air raid siren system would be brought into service. A system, which used the same frequency on normal telephone lines as the peacetime speaking clock, was employed for this whereby a key switch activation alerted 250 national Carrier Control Points or CCPs present in police stations across the country. In turn the CCPs would, via a signal carried along ordinary phone lines, cause 7,000 powered sirens to start up. In rural areas, around 11,000 hand powered sirens would be operated by postmasters, rural police officers, or Royal Observer Corps personnel (even parish priests, publicans, magistrates, subpostmasters or private citizens could be involved in some remote rural areas).

The national warning system saw many changes over the years. During the 1960s and 1970s, much of the local authority civil defence planning in the United Kingdom became outdated, although the WB400/WB600 warning system was maintained and kept serviceable along with updating of ROC instrumentation and communications. The system's main problem was that many of the telephone lines it needed had to be manually switched in times of pre-war tension by Post Office telephone engineers. The links were not hardened against the effects of EMP. In the late 1970s and early 1980s heightened fears and tensions led to a resumption of contingency planning and the upgrading of many systems. The outdated WB400/WB600 systems were replaced with brand new WB1400 equipment, communications links were made permanent and hardened against EMP disruption.

=== Sirens ===
The national siren system originating from World War II had a secondary role of "general warning", particularly for imminent flooding. Following the end of the Cold War, a telephone-based system was thought to be more appropriate for national warnings and less expensive to maintain.

Additionally the government has the legal power to take over editorial control of the BBC during a national emergency under the BBC Charter and the Broadcasting Act 1980.

The national siren system was largely dismantled during the 1990s. The British government cited the increasing use of double-glazed windows (which make sirens harder to hear) and the reduced likelihood of air attack as reasons to eliminate the system in most parts of the country. Some coastal and river areas have retained and regularly test the sirens as part of the flood warning defences. Since 1952, Broadmoor Hospital has employed a network of 13 sirens to warn of escaped patients; this is tested every Monday at 10 am. The hospital sirens were scheduled for removal during 2018 except for one located in the hospital grounds. Carstairs Hospital also retains its sirens, which are tested monthly. In some towns, sirens were once used to summon part-time firemen until the introduction of radio pagers during the 1970s – these stand-alone sirens operated independently of the warning network.

Torness nuclear power station in East Lothian Scotland uses two of these sirens as a warning of an off-site nuclear emergency, tested every Tuesday morning at 10.

=== Warning broadcast ===
Were the attack warning to be triggered, an individual from the UKWMO would call the BBC's technical operations manager and, after introducing themselves and providing a codeword for authentication, (Note: "Falsetto" in the case of the 1991 attack warning message.) say "Radiate national warning immediately." The technical operations manager would then prepare a cassette tape marked with a red dot (or a gramophone record in earlier years) for playback on all channels. If the BBC-based Wartime Broadcasting Service had begun operations by the time of the attack, it would disseminate the warning; if not, or if a surprise attack was under way, the BBC proper would do so.

As of 1991, the message to be broadcast in the event of an impending attack would have been as follows:

Here is an emergency announcement. An air attack is approaching this country. Go to shelter or take cover immediately.

The message would have been repeated twelve times, with the total runtime amounting to two-and-a-half minutes out of the overall four minutes. (Note: The repetitions of the warning message were to be interspersed by sirens, but McDowall's description of this aspect does not make it clear if these were to be prerecorded sirens incorporated into the message itself or if the message was to be somehow synchronised with the national siren system.)

An attack warning with a similar wording to the 1991 message can be heard in the 1971 UKWMO film Sound an Alarm, with that warning message reading "Here is an emergency announcement. An air attack is approaching this country now. Go to shelter or take cover at once." (Note: The earlier 1962 film The Hole in the Ground also features the "Here is an emergency announcement" phrasing but cuts away before the rest of the warning message can be heard.) Government exercises from c. 1979 used a version of the warning message which read "Attack Warning Red. Attack Warning Red. An air attack is approaching this country now. Go to your refuge rooms immediately and remain there until you are told you may come out." Whether the messages featured in Sound an Alarm or the c. 1979 exercises would have been used during a real attack is not currently known.

== Cultural impact ==
The Cold War and the fear of nuclear attack permeated pop culture up until the 1990s. Examples include the song "Four Minute Warning" by the British punk band Chaos UK (EP "Burning Britain", 1982), the poem "Your Attention Please" by Peter Porter, a solo song by Take That singer, Mark Owen, and "Four Minutes" by Roger Waters (of Pink Floyd fame) on his 1987 solo album Radio K.A.O.S.. John Paul Jones has a song entitled "4-Minute Warning" on the 1988 Brian Eno album Music for Films III. The first single of the UK rap crew Gunshot, from 1990, was entitled "Battle Creek Brawl (4 Minute Warning)". A Radiohead track from the 2007 Bonus Disc album In Rainbows Disk 2 is titled "4 Minute Warning".

The four-minute warning was a central plot and narrative device in dramas (both on stage and screen) and novels, often being the motor force of plays, films, novels and cartoon strips. The BBC drama Threads, about how society decays after a nuclear holocaust, focuses on an attack on Sheffield. The War Game also portrays the four-minute warning, pointing out the warning period could be even less. The narrator, Michael Aspel, says it could even be two-and-a-half to three minutes between issuing the warning and impact on a target, or less than 30 seconds for a SLBM attack.

The film adaptation of Raymond Briggs's satirical and blackly comic cartoon strip, When the Wind Blows, has the warning message as part of the script, which triggers arguing between Jim and Hilda Bloggs. Although this is not Peter Donaldson's pre-recorded warning (which was not available on grounds of national security and for copyright reasons), this was a fictional announcement written on grounds of artistic licence. It was read by Robin Houston, a voiceover artist who was known in London as a newsreader for Thames Television (who played the role of newsreader in the film).

The four-minute warning became the inspiration for various jokes and sketches in comedy programmes in Britain, in the same way that the Emergency Broadcast System had in the United States (see nuclear weapons in popular culture). In one episode of Only Fools and Horses, "The Russians Are Coming," Delboy and Rodney Trotter sell fallout shelter kits and have an attack drill. Driving towards their shelter, they are stopped by the police for speeding and asked: "You just heard the four-minute warning?" After being sent on their way, Rodney points out: "We died forty-five seconds ago." Around the same time, a sketch on the BBC Scotland programme Naked Video had a mock announcement warning of an attack with a punchline of "...except for viewers in Scotland."

== See also ==
- Civil Defence Information Bulletin, a precursor to Protect and Survive
- Emergency Broadcast System
- Emergency Alert System
- CONELRAD
- HANDEL
- Mobile phone alerts in the United Kingdom
- Protect and Survive
- Transition to war
- Wartime Broadcasting Service, a broadcasting service run by the BBC that would operate after a nuclear attack or if conventional bombing had destroyed conventional broadcasting systems.
