= Hard Rock (exercise) =

1982 planned British civil defence exercise

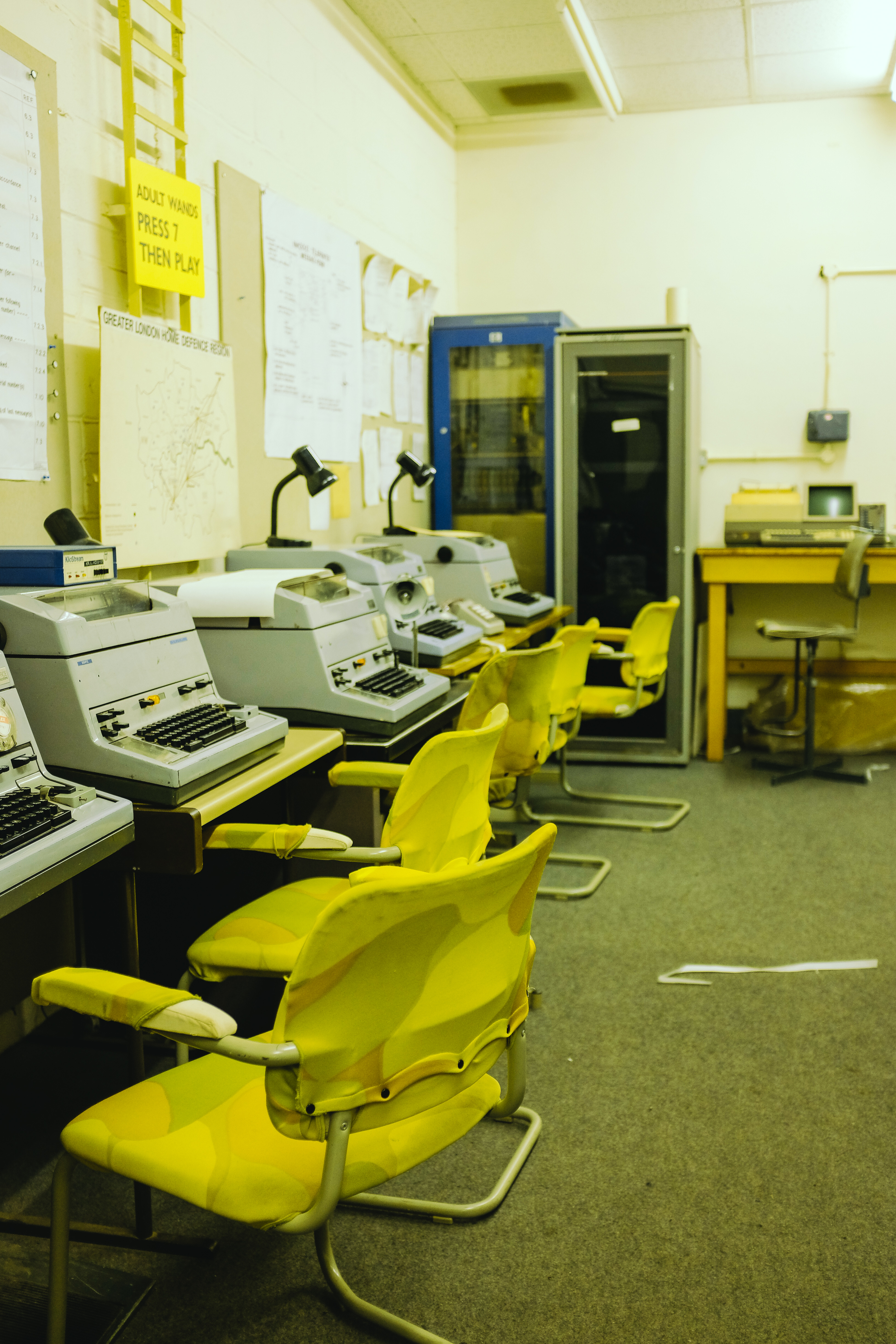
An interior view at Kelvedon Hatch Secret Nuclear Bunker, the regional seat of government for London at the time of the exercise.

Hard Rock (sometimes Operation Hard Rock or the Hard Rock exercise) was a British civil defence exercise planned by the Conservative government to take place in September–October 1982. One of a series of regular national civil defence exercises, it followed Square Leg in 1980. As the public reaction to the scale of devastation forecast in Square Leg was poor, the planners deliberately scaled down the number of warheads supposed for Hard Rock. Despite this, the Campaign for Nuclear Disarmament (CND), who opposed nuclear warfare and were against civil defence exercises, suggested that such an attack as Hard Rock anticipated would have led to the deaths of 12.5 million people.

Since 1980, many British local authorities, who played key roles in civil defence planning, had become nuclear-free zones, opposed to nuclear weapons and nuclear power. Many of these authorities refused to take part in Hard Rock, although finance and the unofficial policy of the Labour Party also played a part. By July, twenty local authorities, all Labour-run, had indicated their refusal to take part and seven more would take part in only a limited manner. Hard Rock was postponed indefinitely, effectively cancelled. In response, the government passed the Civil Defence (General Local Authority Functions) Regulations 1983, compelling local authorities to take part in civil defence exercises.

== Planning ==
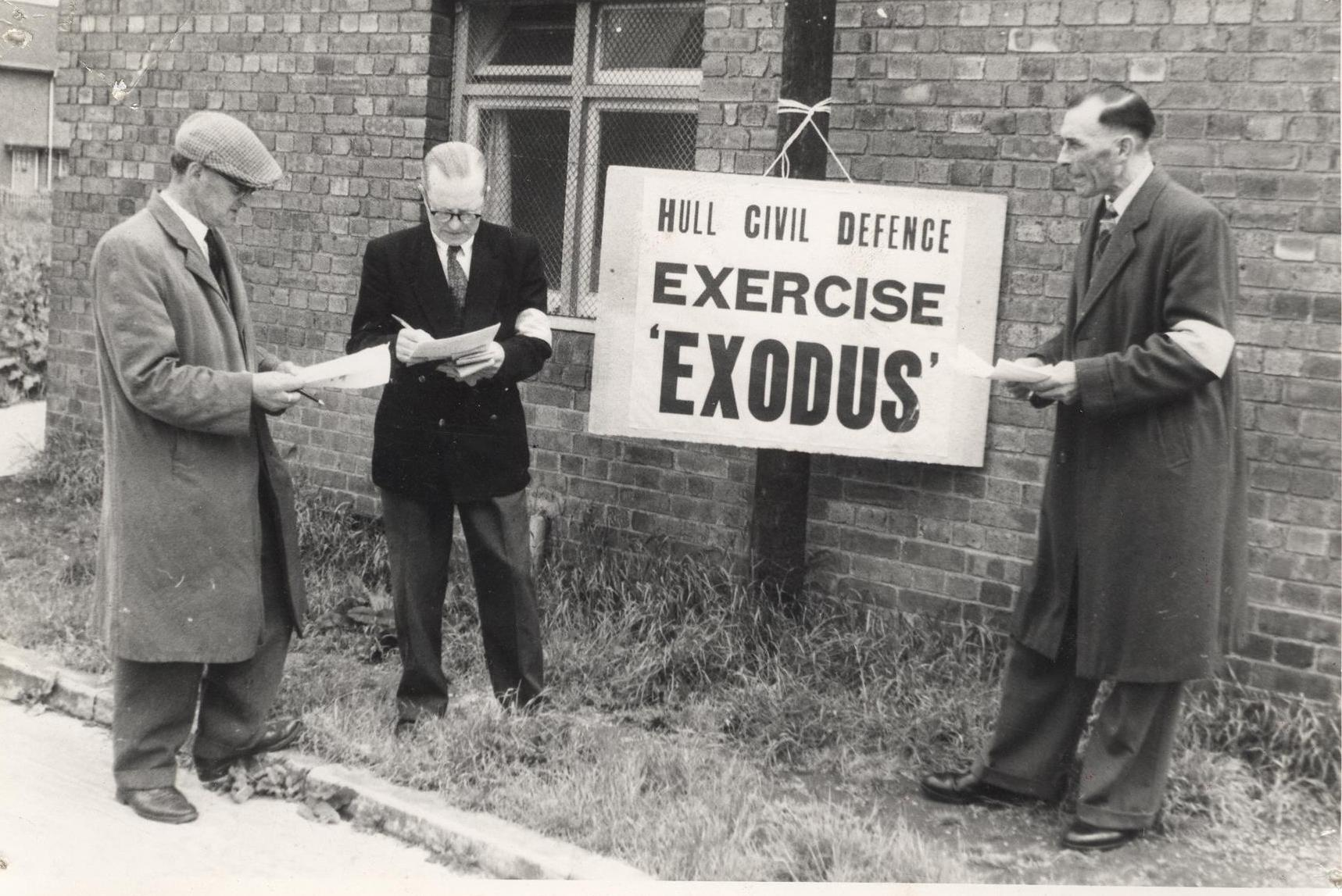
Participants in a local civil defence exercise in Hull, 1961

During the Cold War, the British government carried out a number of civil defence exercises to test the country's preparedness for the effects of war. Since 1949 this had included planning for an attack on the UK with nuclear weapons. From the mid-1970s national civil defence exercises, including a nuclear attack, had been run every 2–3 years. Hard Rock was scheduled to be run in September–October 1982 and would have been the largest civil defence exercise for 15 years. Planning for Hard Rock was started by the National Council for Civil Defence in 1980. It was the first British civil defence exercise to not be planned entirely by the military. The involvement of local authorities in the exercise came via the Civil Defence (Planning) Regulations 1974 which required them to maintain contingency plans for civil defence in their areas.

The attack scenario for the previous simulation, the 1980 Square Leg exercise, had been leaked to the press and the Campaign for Nuclear Disarmament (CND). This scenario envisaged more than 200 megatons of nuclear weapons being detonated on the country, a quantity in line with other British civil defence exercises conducted in the 1970s and advice in the Home Office's training manual for scientific advisors, issued in 1977. The public response to the projected high casualty rates and widespread destruction had been poor so the Hard Rock planners deliberately assumed an attack scenario with fewer weapons, totalling less than 50 megatons, and avoiding strikes on some obvious targets such as American air bases.

Journalist and writer on Cold War military secrets Duncan Campbell noted that no missiles were assumed to be targeted at London, Manchester, Edinburgh, Liverpool, Bristol or Cardiff and those targeted at other cities were presumed to miss; in addition, the US and British submarine bases at Holy Loch and Faslane and the main British and North Atlantic Treaty Organization (NATO) military control centres were also assumed not to be targets. Campbell lists 54 targets in the final exercise scenario, down from 105 in a June 1981 plan. He suggested that the Home Office and Ministry of Defence had removed "politically undesirable" targets from the scenario. He notes other political decisions affected the exercise: the scale of refugee movements was toned down and references to civil disorder were kept vague. The issuing of the Protect and Survive booklet to the public was to be one of the steps taken in the exercise but its brand had become so embarrassing to the government that it was referred to as the "Public, Do-It-Yourself Civil Defence" booklet.

Even with fewer nuclear weapons, the Hard Rock exercise projected large-scale damage and loss of life. The CND estimated that an attack of 50 megatons would result in the deaths of 12.5 million people, while an attack with 220 megatons would lead to the deaths of 39 million, some 72 per cent of the population at the time. The CND publicised these estimates under the title of "Hard Luck". Campbell, using a model by Philip Steadman of the Open University and Stan Openshaw of Newcastle University, forecast 12 million deaths or serious injuries, of which 2 million were forecast to come from the bombing and 5 million from the effects of fallout.

== Exercise ==
According to Campbell, the exercise would have begun with a simulated transition to war period from 19 September, during which the officials in their bunkers would be given simulated daily briefings and news bulletins, including simulations of panic buying and fuel shortages. A war with the Soviet Union was to have broken out at 4:30 am on 27 September with an invasion of West Germany and conventional air raids on the UK. During this time, the military had a limited role to play in the exercise, simulating reconnaissance flights over nuclear target areas and practising moving ships in and out of ports scheduled to remain unaffected. At 8:00 pm on 2 October, the exercise forecast the nuclear strike would begin, continuing into the following morning. The exercise would run for a simulated one-month post-attack period.

Exercise Hard Rock would have focused on the response by local authorities in the aftermath of the attack. It envisaged the abandonment of irradiated cities, where fires would be left to burn uncontrolled, and the breakdown of society into lawlessness. The exercise included decisions made to triage casualties by likelihood of survival, with those affected by severe radiation sickness left to die without food or treatment, and the prioritisation of resources on those healthy adults with skills necessary to keep remaining infrastructure working. Campbell records that one of the measures to be taken during the pre-strike phase of the exercise would have been the release of all but a thousand inmates from civilian prisons.

== Opposition and local authority refusals ==
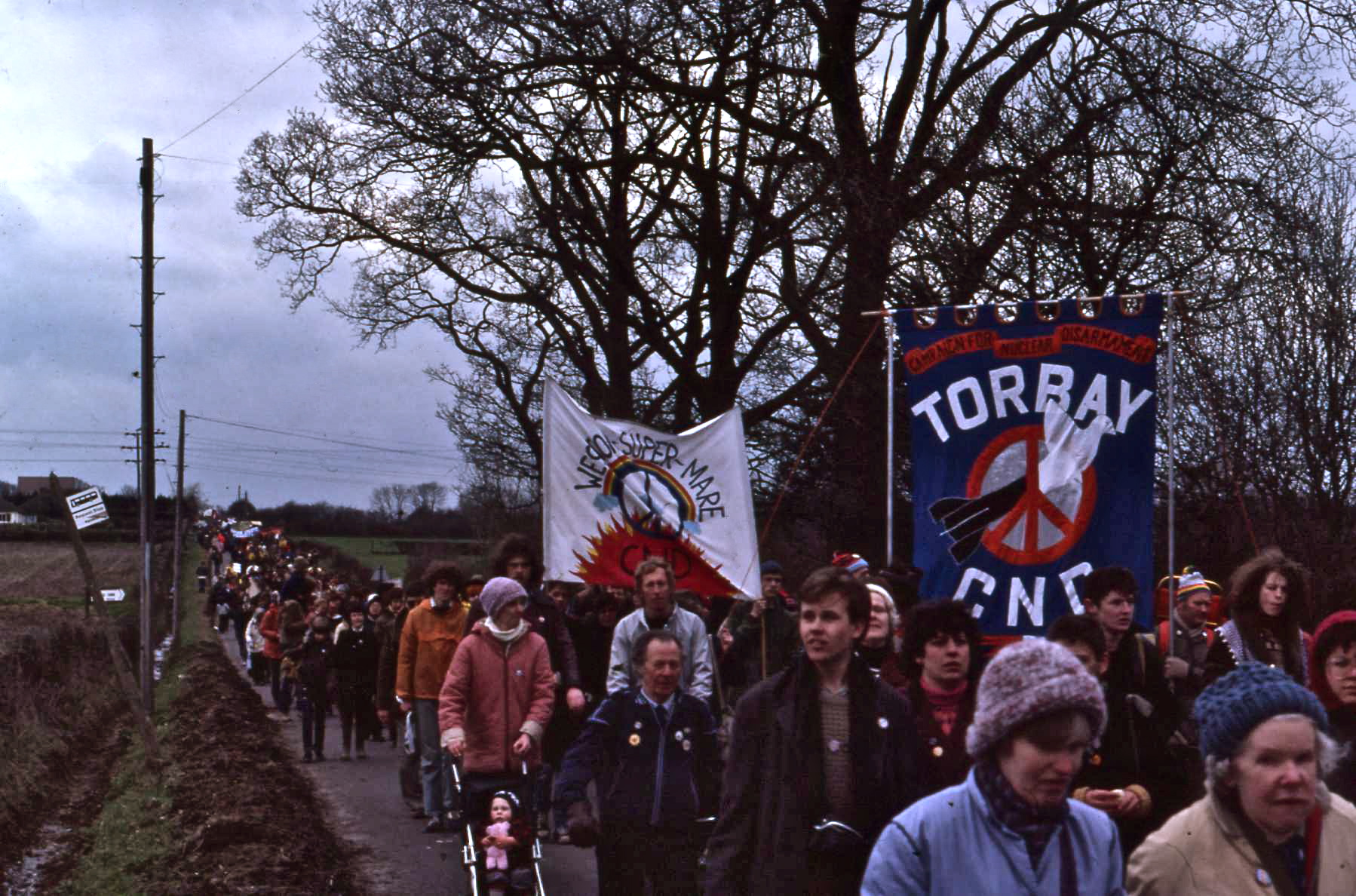
A 1983 CND demonstration

The running of the Hard Rock exercise was opposed by the CND, who said it made no sense to run an exercise on post-attack response if the government's position was that the nuclear deterrent was effective. The pacifist Peace Pledge Union opposed the exercise on the grounds that it "normalised militarism".

In 1980, Manchester City Council declared itself a nuclear-free zone, proclaiming nuclear weapons and nuclear power unwelcome within its boundaries. It was the first British local authority to do so but by 1982, 143 authorities had joined it. Many of these authorities refused to participate in Hard Rock on principle, though other concerns such as cost were also a factor. Refusals were largely in local authorities controlled by the Labour Party, with some using it as an opportunity to demonstrate their opposition to the defence policies of the Conservative government. The Labour Party National Executive Committee (NEC) had, in June 1981, advised local authorities to "refuse to co-operate with all but the bare legal minimum necessary under the 1974 Civil Defence (Planning) exercises and arrangements which are concerned with nuclear weapons and nuclear war preparations".

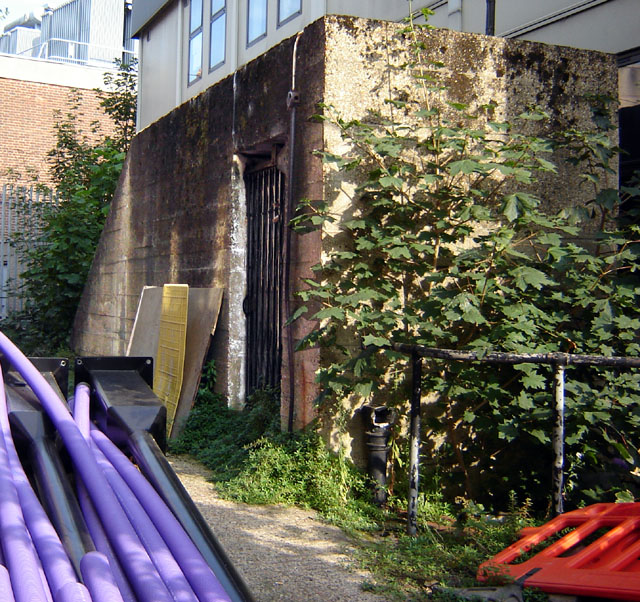
The entrance to the Stoke Newington Civil Defence centre pictured in its disused state in 2005

The CND offered support to any authorities that decided not to participate and, with the Scientists Against Nuclear Arms organisation and the unofficial support of the Labour NEC, produced a pack of information outlining its views on the exercise. As part of its opposition to Hard Rock, the Greater London Council invited the public to view its secret nuclear bunkers, intended for post-attack command by civil defence personnel, with 4,800 people visiting them in six days. Had the exercise gone ahead protestors planned to establish peace camps outside the regional seats of government from which civil defence operations would be co-ordinated. The protestors planned to impede access to the facilities and to identify personnel who attended the exercises.

By July 1982, 19 county councils and the Greater London Council, out of the 54 local authorities which had been asked to participate, had confirmed their refusal. During Prime Minister's Questions on 15 July, the prime minister, Margaret Thatcher, stated that all 20 authorities that refused were Labour-run. A further seven local authorities stated that they could comply in only a limited manner. By September, the Home Secretary Willie Whitelaw had announced that the exercise had been indefinitely postponed, though it was, in effect, cancelled.

== Legacy ==
Despite other factors such as politics and finance, the CND believed the cancellation of Hard Rock was primarily because of its campaign. The CND's Scottish secretary Ian Davison called it the organisation's first major victory and Peter Byrd, a writer on the history of the peace movement, described the cancellation as "probably [its] biggest single success". The government blamed the Labour NEC for the cancellation.

In the wake of the cancellation of Hard Rock, Michael Heseltine, secretary of state for defence, established Defence Secretariat 19 within the ministry to better explain to the public the government's policy on nuclear deterrence and multilateral disarmament. The government introduced the Civil Defence (General Local Authority Functions) Regulations in 1983. These compelled local authorities to support national civil defence exercises and imposed financial penalties for them and individual councillors if they did not comply. The regulations also gave the government the power to appoint special commissioners to run the exercises within the local authorities.

The civil service proposed running Hard Rock again after the Conservative victory in the 1983 general election but it was never run. That same year, Labour peer Willie Ross, Baron Ross of Marnock claimed, in the House of Lords, that the Ministry of Defence was glad the exercise had been cancelled, since it would have shown widespread inadequacies in local civil defence planning. A Home Office investigation in 1988 found a widespread refusal by local authorities to implement the Civil Defence (General Local Authority Functions) Regulations 1983. From 1986 British civil defence planning transitioned away from large national exercises to the Planned Programme of Implementation (PPI) at a local level. PPI shifted the focus of civil defence preparations from nuclear war to an "all hazards" approach for a variety of civil emergencies.

== Map of nuclear warhead targets ==
The following map indicates, according to Duncan Campbell, the targets for nuclear warheads supposed in Hard Rock. Air burst detonations are shown with blue markers, ground burst detonations with red markers. An asterisk (*) denotes a near miss which might be 5–12 miles (8–19 km) off target.
