= In case of crisis or war =

Swedish emergency information pamphlet

The 2024 edition of the pamphlet "Om krisen eller kriget kommer" (In case of crisis or war) in Swedish (left) and English (right).

"In case of crisis or war" (Swedish: Om krisen eller kriget kommer, literally "If a crisis or war comes") originally "In case of war" (Swedish: Om kriget kommer, literally "If war comes") is a pamphlet containing information about how to act in a situation of national crisis in Sweden.

Originally prepared by the Supreme Commander of the Swedish Armed Forces' office, In case of crisis or war has been delivered to every household in Sweden from 1943 to 1991 and again from 2018. The most important parts of the publication were also inserted at the end of all Swedish phone books. The publication contained information about how to act in a situation of national crisis and most notably, nuclear war. Between the 1950s and 1970s, Sweden went through a period with extraordinary high economic growth called the "record years" (Swedish: rekordåren). This made it possible to invest in civil defence and have a plan to save the entire population even in the event of a superpower invasion. If the war comes was a way to inform the public about these plans. With the end of the Cold War, the publication was deemed to be outdated and distribution ceased in 1991. The most basic information was kept in phone books until the early 21st century.

In 2018, the pamphlet was revised and distributed by the Swedish Civil Contingencies Agency (MSB) under the name "In case of crisis or war" (Swedish: Om krisen eller kriget kommer). A new version of the pamphlet was distributed in 2024. In 2026, the first pamphlet aimed specifically at Swedish businesses was published.

== Content ==
In case of crisis or war is a short publication and contains the basic information that the Government of Sweden considered necessary to know in the event of war. The chapter about civil defence contains the exhortation "If Sweden is attacked, we will never surrender. Any suggestion to the contrary is false." (Swedish: Om Sverige blir angripet kommer vi aldrig att ge upp. Alla uppgifter om att motståndet ska upphöra är falska.). The publication also contained information about civil defence sirens, how to act in an air raid shelter, and what belongings to bring in the case of a refugee situation.

== Editions ==
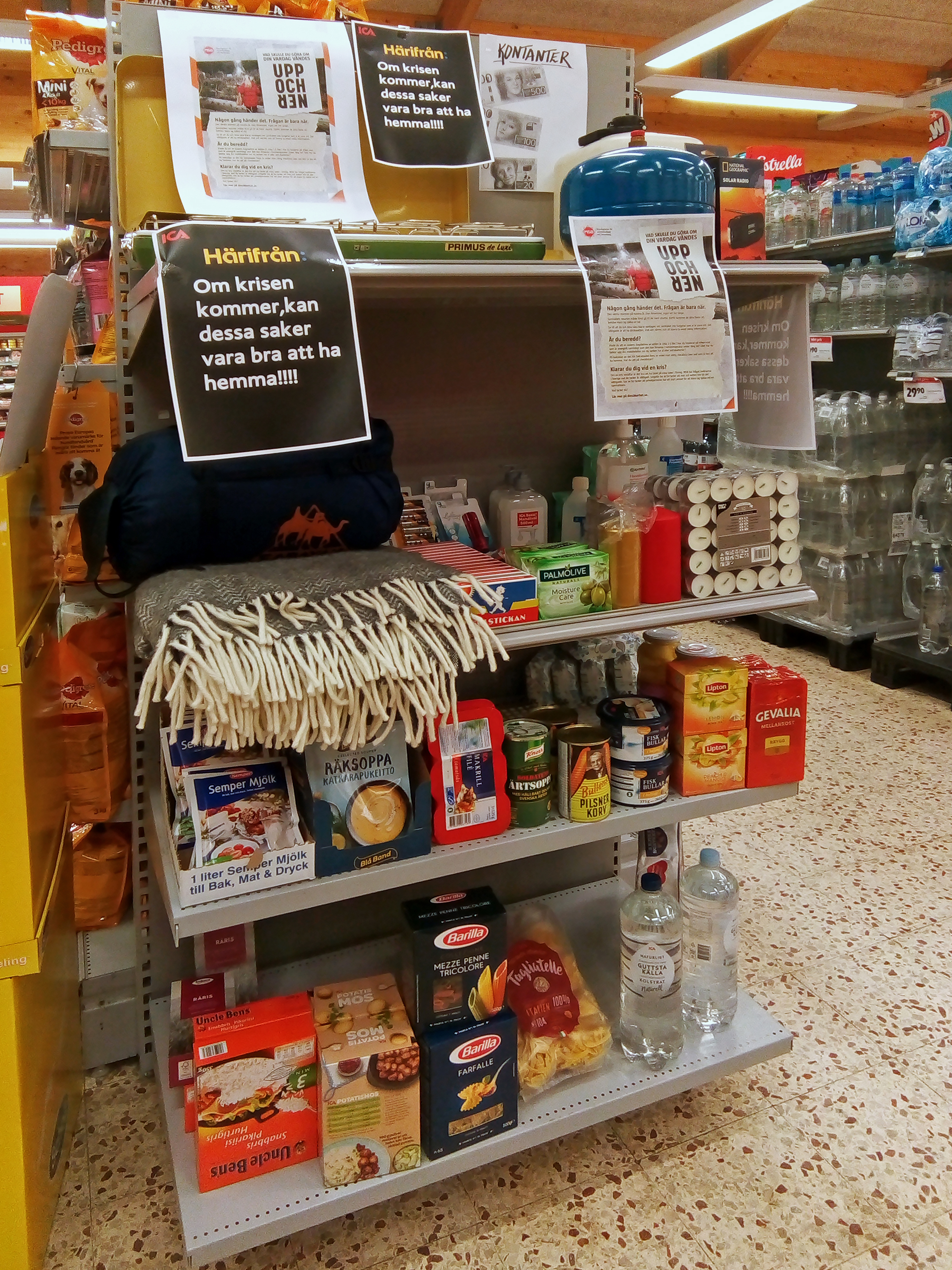
Display of items listed in the 2018 edition of the pamphlet. ICA grocery store, Brastad, Sweden

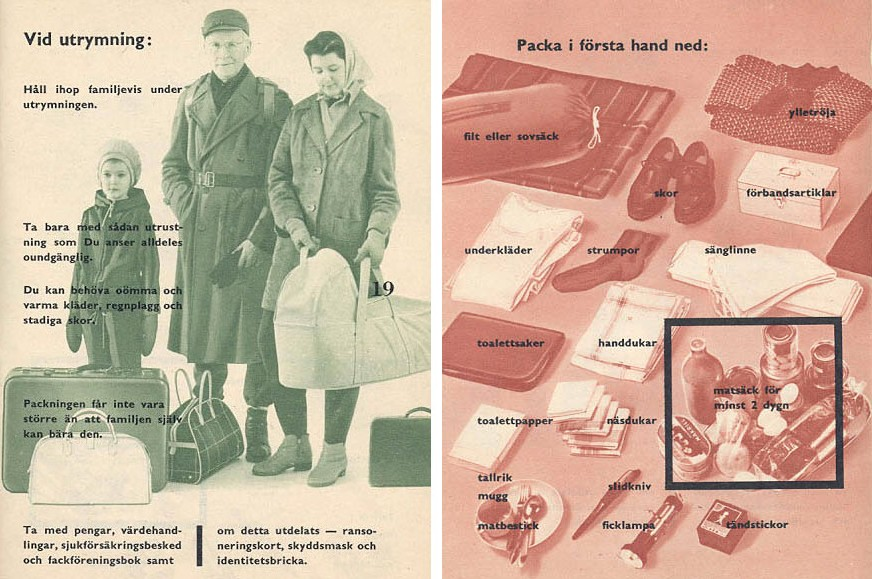
- Two pages out of the 1961 edition of "If crisis or war comes"
  Om kriget kommer – vägledning för rikets medborgare i händelse av krig (If the war comes – guidance to the citizens of the nation in case of war), Statens Informationsstyrelse, 1943 (16 pages)
- Om kriget kommer – vägledning för Sveriges medborgare (If the war comes – guidance for the citizens of Sweden), Kungliga Civilförsvarsstyrelsen, 1952 (33 pages)
- Om kriget kommer – vägledning för Sveriges medborgare (If the war comes – guidance for the citizens of Sweden), Kungliga Civilförsvarsstyrelsen, 1961 (48 pages)
- Om kriget kommer – vad du bör veta (If the war comes – what you should know), Beredskapsnämnden för psykologiskt försvar, 1983 (39 pages)
- Om kriget kommer (If the war comes), sv:Styrelsen för psykologiskt försvar (SPF), 1987 (31 pages)
- Om kriget eller katastrofen kommer – vad gör vi med barnen? (If war or catastrophe comes – what do we do with the children), Socialstyrelsen, 1991 (49 pages) ISBN 9138112132
- Om krisen eller kriget kommer – viktig information till Sveriges invånare (In case of crisis or war – important information for the population of Sweden), Myndigheten för samhällsskydd och beredskap (MSB), 2018 (20 pages) ISBN 9789173838085
- Om krisen eller kriget kommer - viktig information till Sveriges invånare (In case of crisis or war – important information for the population of Sweden), Myndigheten för samhällsskydd och beredskap (MSB), 2024 (31 pages) ISBN 9789179275273

=== 21st-century versions ===
Due to the unstable international political situation, the Swedish government decided to distribute a new version of the pamphlet to 4.7 million Swedish households between May and June 2018. The 2018 version was titled In case of crisis or war (Swedish: Om krisen eller kriget kommer) and included information on modern situations such as terrorism, fake news and cell phone usage during a crisis.

A new version of the pamphlet was published in 2024 and is scheduled to be distributed to 5 million households in late November 2024. The 2024 version include lessons learned by the war in Ukraine and the COVID-19 pandemic such as information about different ways to be protect oneself from air raids and how to act during an evacuation. The version also contains information about terrorist attacks, psychological warfare, extreme weather, cyberattacks and the spread of infectious diseases.

In January 2026, the Swedish Civil Defence and Resilience Agency (MCF) published its first pamphlet aimed at Swedish businesses. The pamphlet was distributed to 130,000 workplaces with five or more employees in Sweden. In June 2026, the pamphlet for Swedish households was updated following the agency's name change from MSB to MCF and the introduction of sv:SE-Alert.

== See also ==
- Protect and Survive
- Free war
