= Maroon (rocket) =

Type of rocket which generates a loud bang and a bright flash

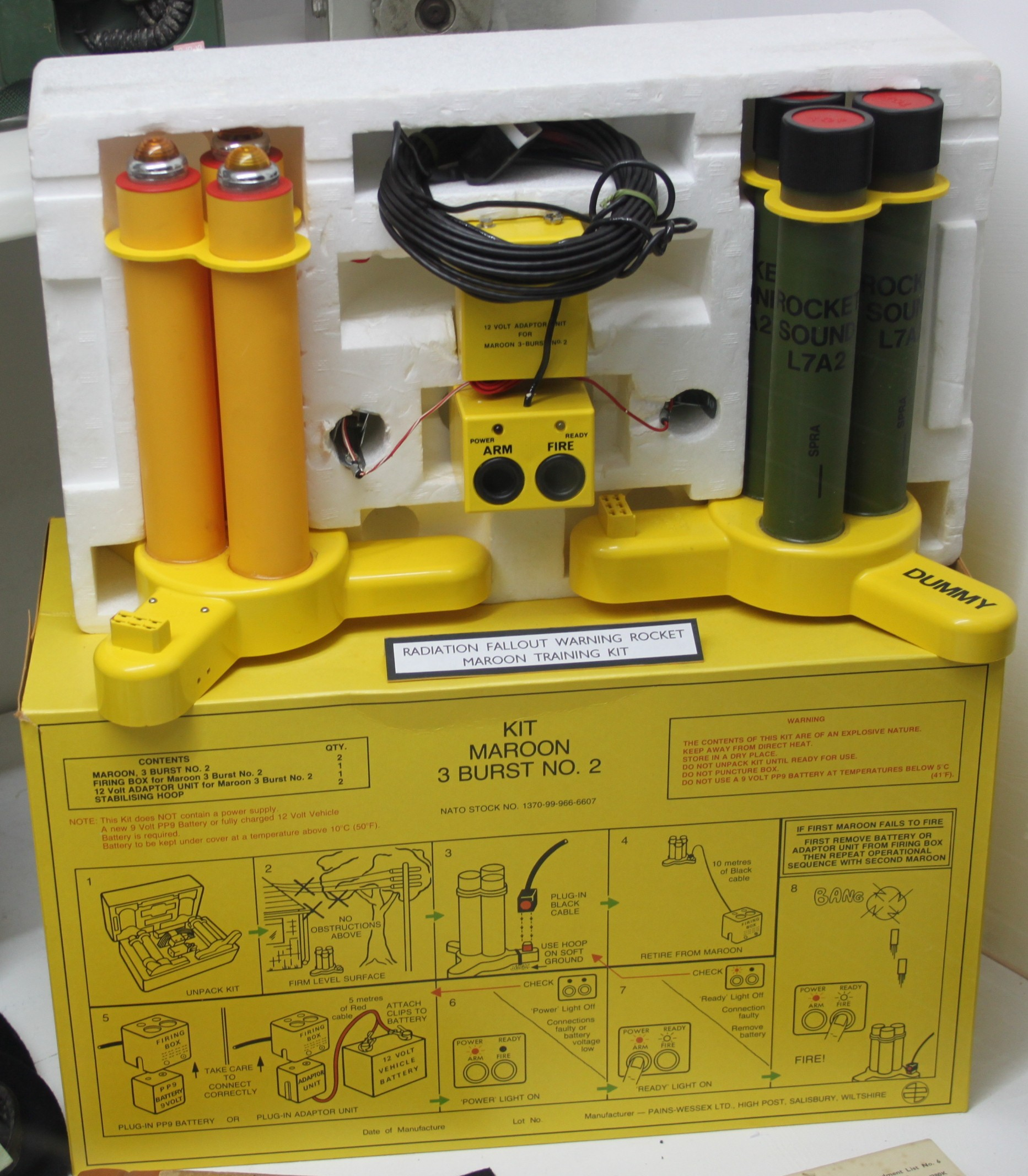
Training/Dummy version of the British No. 2 3 Burst Maroon Kit (containing L7A2 Sound Rocket maroons and electric firing apparatus) on display at the Hack Green Secret Nuclear Bunker

A maroon is a type of rocket which generates a loud bang and a bright flash. It is used as an alarm or warning. The British Royal National Lifeboat Institution (RNLI) used these rockets in the past to call the crew when the lifeboat needs to be launched. Another example was as a signal on a railway, to alert oncoming trains that they must stop due to unexpected accident or track work ahead. Used by British spotters in World War I located around cities, they would fire when German bombers were approaching. Maroons were also intended to be used by the British Civil Defence or Royal Observer Corps in the event of a nuclear attack - the Protect and Survive series of informational civil nuclear defence videos shows the intended usage of maroons to signal impending fallout. Maroons would be used in groups of three to sound an alarm.
