= Handel (warning system) =

Codename for the former attack warning system in the UK

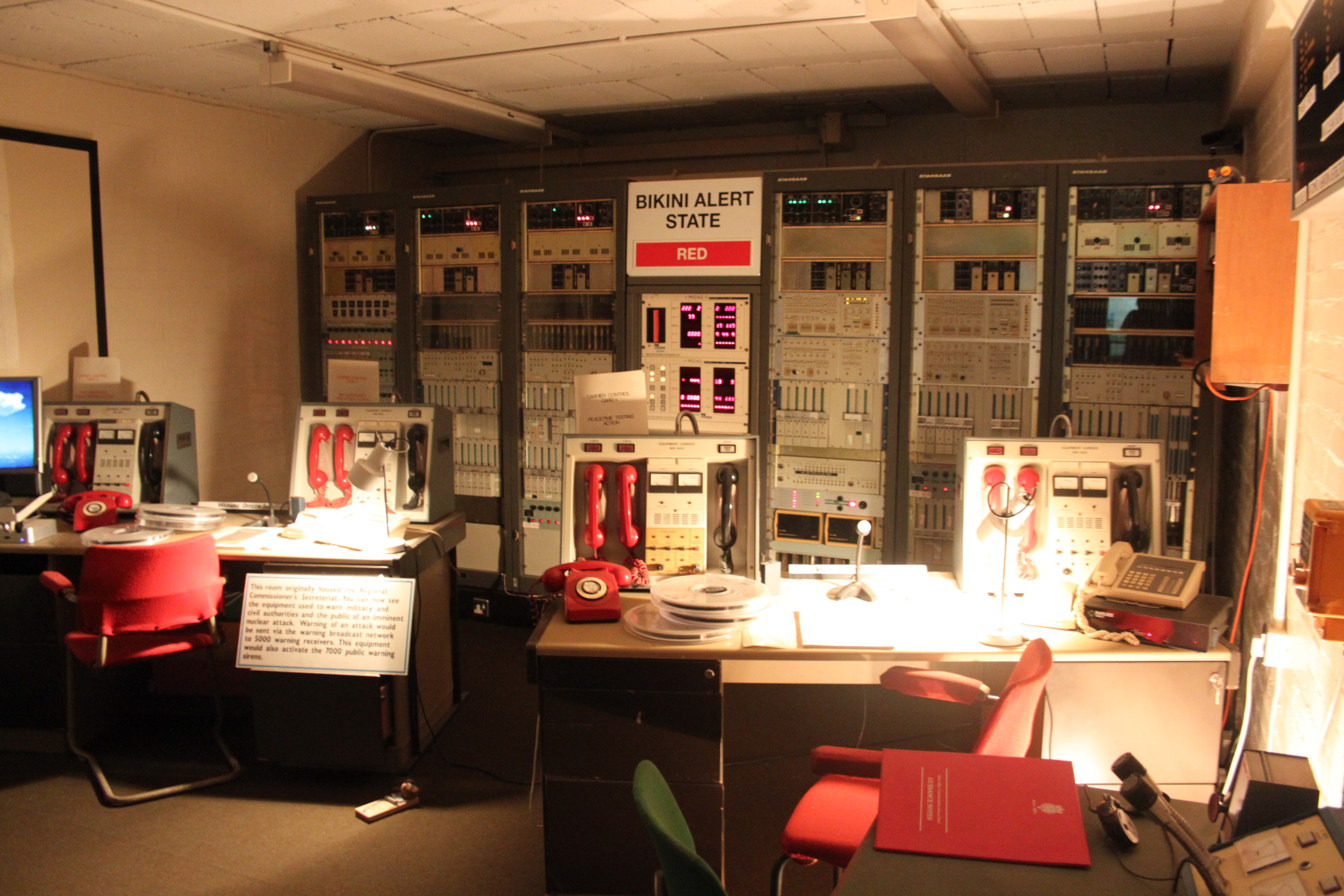
WB1400 Carrier Control Points on display at Hack Green Secret Nuclear Bunker. A WB1800 Operating Unit is visible in the right foreground.

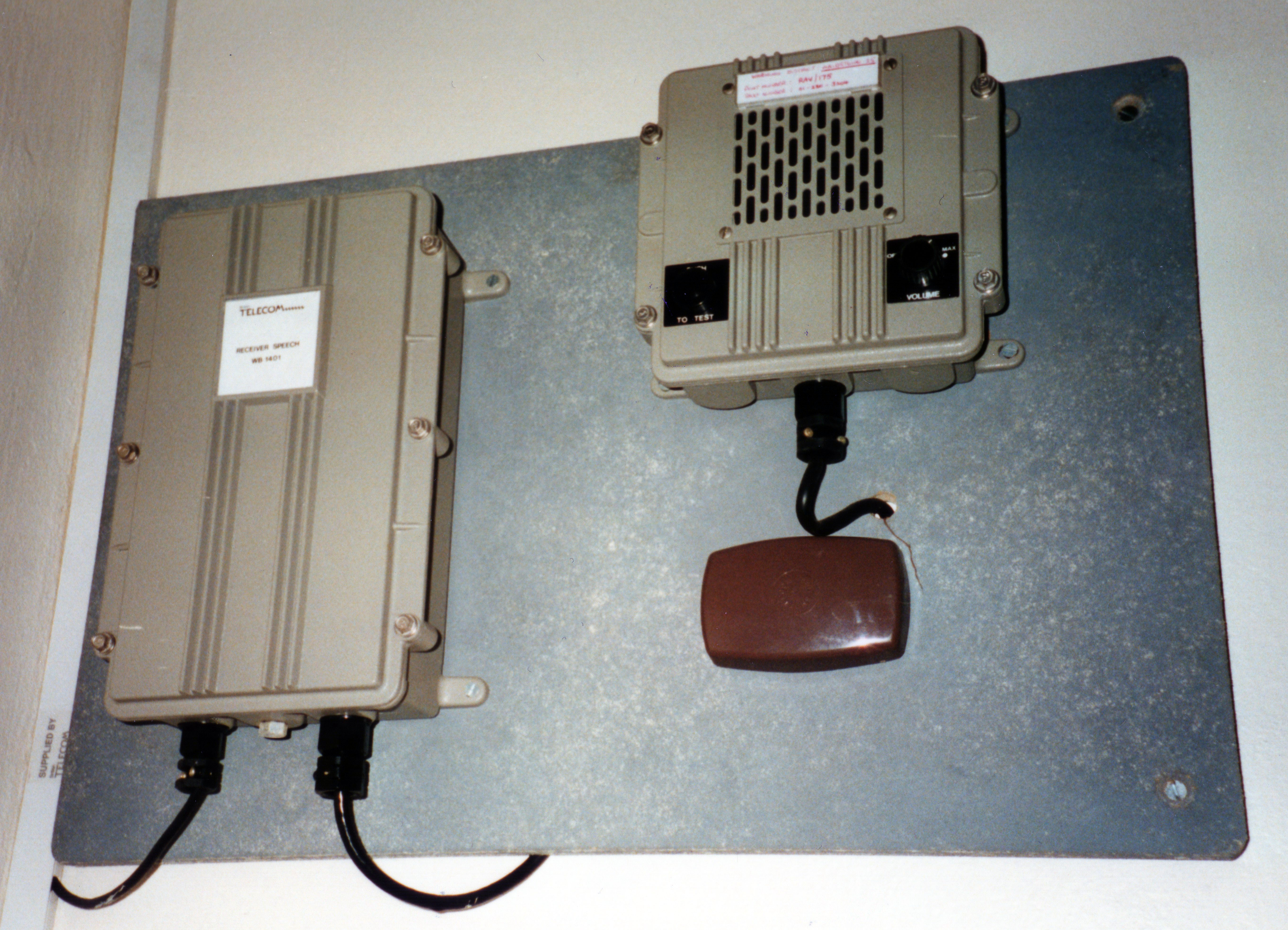
WB1401 Speech Receiver with matching loudspeaker unit.

Handel was the code-name for the United Kingdom's national attack warning system in the Cold War that was in place between 1962 and 1992. It consisted of two injection sites (RAF High Wycombe and the Royal Observer Corps Group 21 bunker in Goosnargh, Lancashire) linked to a series of two hundred and fifty-two carrier control points installed in major police stations; in turn, the control points were linked to several thousand (Note: The exact number varied over the life of the system; the 1962 UKWMO film The Hole in The Ground quotes a figure of 15,000 warning points, the 1971 UKWMO film Sound an Alarm quotes a figure of 20,000 warning points, and a 1980s document prepared by or for Derbyshire Constabulary quotes a figure of 11,000 warning points.) receiver units installed at "warning points" in various police, fire, and coastguard stations, government buildings, hospitals, industrial centres, and Royal Observer Corps posts, with sufficiently remote areas having the units installed in post offices, public houses, churches, or even private dwellings.

A Handel warning console can be seen at the Imperial War Museum in London among their Cold War exhibits, alongside the warning apparatus used by Kent Police (which was located at Maidstone police station to activate the sirens).

== Operation ==
If an enemy attack was detected, a key on the left-hand side of an "operating unit" console at one or both of the injection sites would be turned and two lights would come on; the operator would then press and hold down a red button and announce "Attack Warning Red". At the carrier control points, if one or both red lights flashed with a constant alarm, or if a white light flashed with an intermittent alarm, the control point operator was to lift the two red handsets (red lights) or the black handset (white light), (Note: If one or both red lights and the white light came on at the same time, priority was to be given to the red handsets.) listen for the injection site's "Attack Warning Red", and acknowledge it; they would then pass on their own "Attack Warning Red" to the warning points before activating powered sirens linked to the control point (some 7,000 sirens in total were linked to the system). Those manning the warning points would operate hand-cranked sirens (or activate any powered sirens they might have possessed) once they had received the attack warning message. The sirens would coincide with the broadcast of a "four-minute warning" on media channels.

Linked into Handel were the twenty-five Royal Observer Corps group controls, also with direct links to the carrier control points. As fallout from an eventual nuclear attack began to descend, "black" fallout warnings could be generated from the group controls on a localized basis over the same carrier wave system. Handel was also intended for use in communicating the eventual "white" all-clear message.

Initial Handel equipment fell under the WB400 and WB600 series of designations; this was upgraded from 1982 onwards to an EMP-resistant equipment line falling under the WB1400 series of designations. WB1400-series receivers were also trickle-charged to ensure that they would work when needed (while earlier receivers often suffered from unnecessary battery drainage due to being erroneously left on outside of test periods). The "operating unit" console at the injection sites was known as the WB1800.

The Handel system was based around the telephone system used for the speaking clock. The rationale for piggybacking off the speaking clock system was to tackle two problems at once; it reduced running costs (Handel would most likely be used only once in its working life, though it was regularly tested) and the telephone lines were continually tested for readiness by sharing infrastructure with a public service, meaning a fault could be detected and repaired in time to give a warning.

== Warning messages ==
Message	How it is received	Action to be taken	Notes
Test broadcast (War emergency)	The words "Test call, testing" (said three times) followed by the message: "A test of the Attack Warning signal will now follow" (also said three times). This would be followed by various signals and then the message: "A test of the Attack Warning signal has just been made" (said twice).	None	If an attack warning occurred during the test, the latter was to be abandoned immediately.
Attack warning	Warbling note followed by the message: "Attack warning RED!" This would be followed by a minute-long control signal, activating the powered sirens	Sound warning by activating powered sirens/operating hand-cranked sirens, the attack warning would be a rising and falling note.	Attack warning would be broadcast on all television and radio stations by the BBC; the carrier control point operator themselves might be first alerted to a live attack via BBC broadcast.
Fallout warning	High-pitched pip signal followed by a spoken message. For example: "Fallout warning BLACK, London!"	Fire warning maroon three times. Though in some areas, it could have been three gongs, whistles, or even church bells creating one long note followed by two short notes forming the morse note "D-".	Fallout warning would be broadcast on the radio "wherever possible". Could also be given by word of mouth from the police and ROC staff.
Fallout expected within one hour or more	High-pitched pip signal followed by the spoken message. For example: "Fallout warning GREY, Canterbury!"	Fire warning maroon or sound siren producing one long note but interrupted in short succession. Could also be given by church bells or word of mouth from the police and civil defence wardens	Fell out of use by the late 1960s.
All clear	High-pitched pip signal followed by a spoken message: "Attack message WHITE!" A minute-long control tone would activate the powered sirens, though activating these was only warranted if the all-clear message was to apply to all warning districts rather than to a specific district or districts. Hand-cranked sirens would be operated in response to a general all-clear message or in response to an all-clear message applying to their specific warning district.	Sound siren giving a steady note	Further warnings may be broadcast on radio, along with information on aid for survivors and morale-boosting broadcasts (There was also a "confidence tone" that demonstrated the system was working and advised listeners to stand by for a warning at any time).

== See also ==
- UK Emergency Alert System
- BIKINI state
- Four-minute warning
- National Emergency Alarm Repeater
- Plectron
