= Civil Defence Information Bulletin =

1964 film

Civil Defence Information Bulletin were a series of seven public information films starring Robert Urquhart, dealing with civil defence measures individuals and families could take in the event of a nuclear attack on Great Britain. They were produced for the Home Office and the Scottish Home and Health Department by RHR Productions United Kingdom in 1964. The writer was Nicolas Alwyn and the producer Ronald H. Riley.

In the event of an international crisis in which nuclear war was imminent, these films were to be broadcast by all television networks in the UK, in much the same manner as the Protect and Survive films were to be broadcast from the late 1970s. The information provided in the films is based on Civil Defence Handbook No. 10 Advising the Householder on Protection against Nuclear Attack.

== The films ==
Topics included in the films include:

- The effects of nuclear weapons: heat, shock wave, and fallout
- Measures to mitigate the effects of the initial heat and blast
- Preparing a fallout room
- Supplies to stock and how to arrange them
- Attack warning signals: Red, attack imminent; Grey, fallout expected within the hour; Black, fallout expected immediately; all-clear
- Immediate steps to protect oneself during the initial heat and blast, with actions similar to the U.S. Civil Defence film Duck and Cover
- Steps to take immediately after a blast but before fallout arrives
- Steps to take after fallout clears
- How to prepare for evacuation

Note: the grey warning was discontinued after 1968.

Each film was a few minutes long and would feature the ominous jingle with the civil defence logo. Then there was a blank title card on the subject matter and then a mix of live-action clips, animation and still images. The advice contained in the films relied on (referred to as an inner refuge in Protect and Survive) and the idea of white washing the windows to prevent fires. The warning system features four coloured warning systems (red meaning imminent attack, grey meaning fallout in one hour, black meaning imminent fallout, and finally the all clear) similar to the system formalised by the UK Bikini state levels from 1970.

- Film One: The Hazards. This explains the three main hazards associating with nuclear attack, including how the blast wave can destroy buildings and kill people. It also explains the dangers of fallout.
- Film Two: Protective Measures. Explains how citizens can safeguard property in the event of nuclear blast. It gives advice on sheltering in homes flats, prefabs, bungalows and similar such accommodation and on protection of walls, doors and windows
- Film Three: Details are given on building a core and food and water supplies.
- Film Four: Preparing The House. Fire precautions. Gives advice on packing an emergency Survival kit for use of evacuation.
- Film Five: What to do if it happens. Explains the four warnings. RED (Attack warning). GREY (fallout expected in one hour). BLACK (imminent fallout). ALL CLEAR (no danger of attack or fallout. Also gives the advice that on the event of no warning.
- Film Six: What to do after an attack. This gives advice on checking for outside damage to the home and fire fighting advice with an emphasis on the danger of fallout.
- Film 7: Life under Fallout Conditions. This section gives advice on living in the post attack environment .It emphasises that it may be a fortnight before any food and water can be provided by local authorities.
