= Wartime Broadcasting Service =

Service of the BBC to be broadcast in preparation of a nuclear war

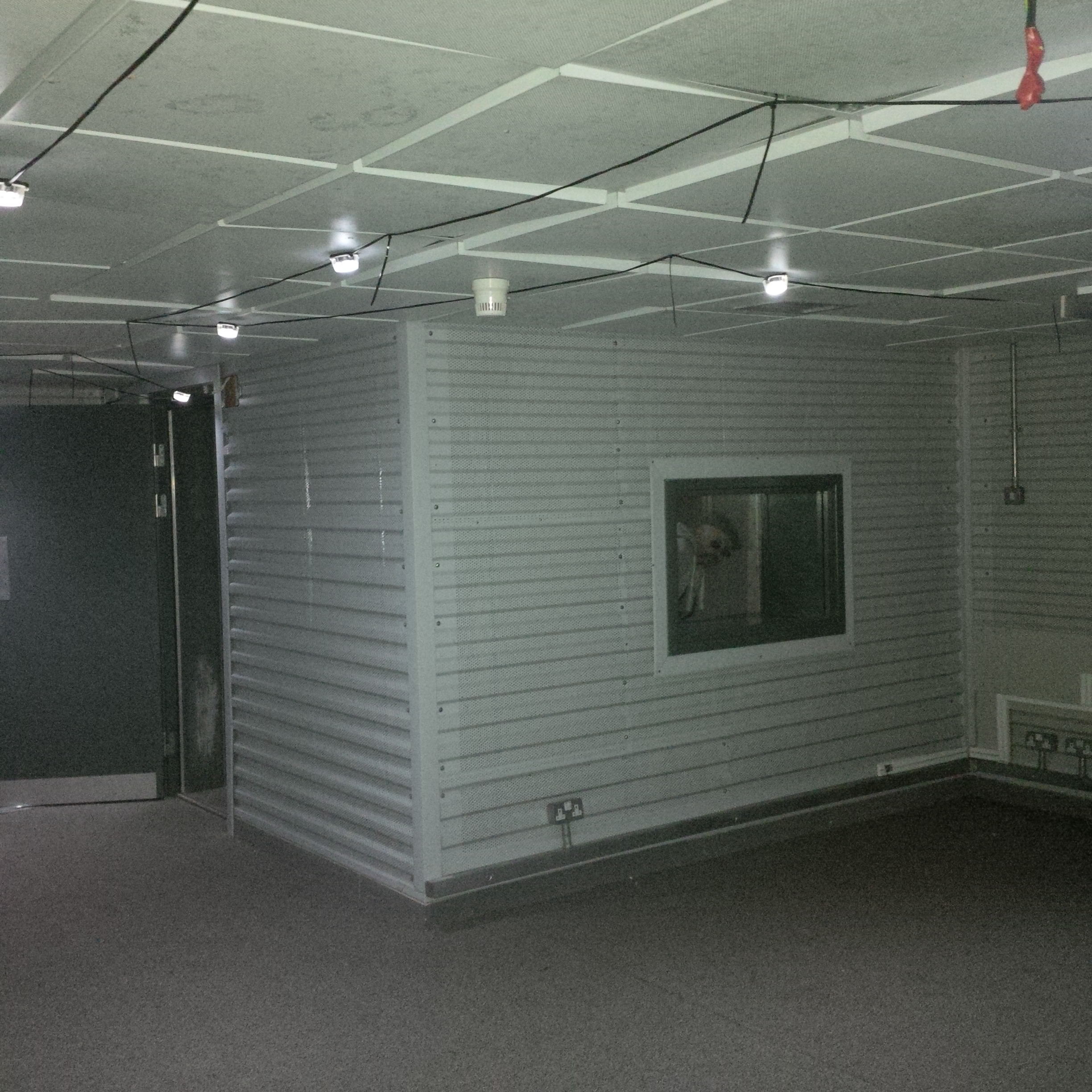
BBC Radio recording studio at the Cultybraggan nuclear bunker, Perthshire, shortly before it was dismantled in 2014

The Wartime Broadcasting Service is an emergency service of the BBC that is intended to broadcast in the United Kingdom either after a nuclear attack or if conventional bombing destroyed regular BBC facilities in a conventional war. It is unclear if the Wartime Broadcasting Service is still operational as plans are kept mainly secret with the BBC and government officials. According to an article by the BBC, recordings of a nuclear attack warning are still re-recorded and kept up to date periodically.

== Origins and history ==
The origins of the service lie in pre-World War II plans to disperse BBC staff to facilities such as Wood Norton to guarantee due functioning of the corporation if cities such as London, Belfast, Cardiff, Glasgow and Edinburgh were attacked by the Luftwaffe.

In the post-war era, plans were revised so that the Wartime Broadcasting Service would have coped with a nuclear strike by installing 54 low-powered transmitters and keeping (what remained of) the main transmitter network in reserve, in case Soviet bombers used them to home in on targets. Although vague, plans from the mid-1950s were to provide both a national and regional radio service 24 hours a day (mirroring peacetime BBC operations at the time) with the objective of providing "instruction, information and encouragement as far as practical by means of guidance, news and diversion to relieve stress and strain". "Diversion" was to be in the form of music and selected pre-recorded programmes. BBC executives drafted a schedule made up of music, drama, comedy, and religious programmes to be broadcast over a period of 100 days after a nuclear attack on the United Kingdom.

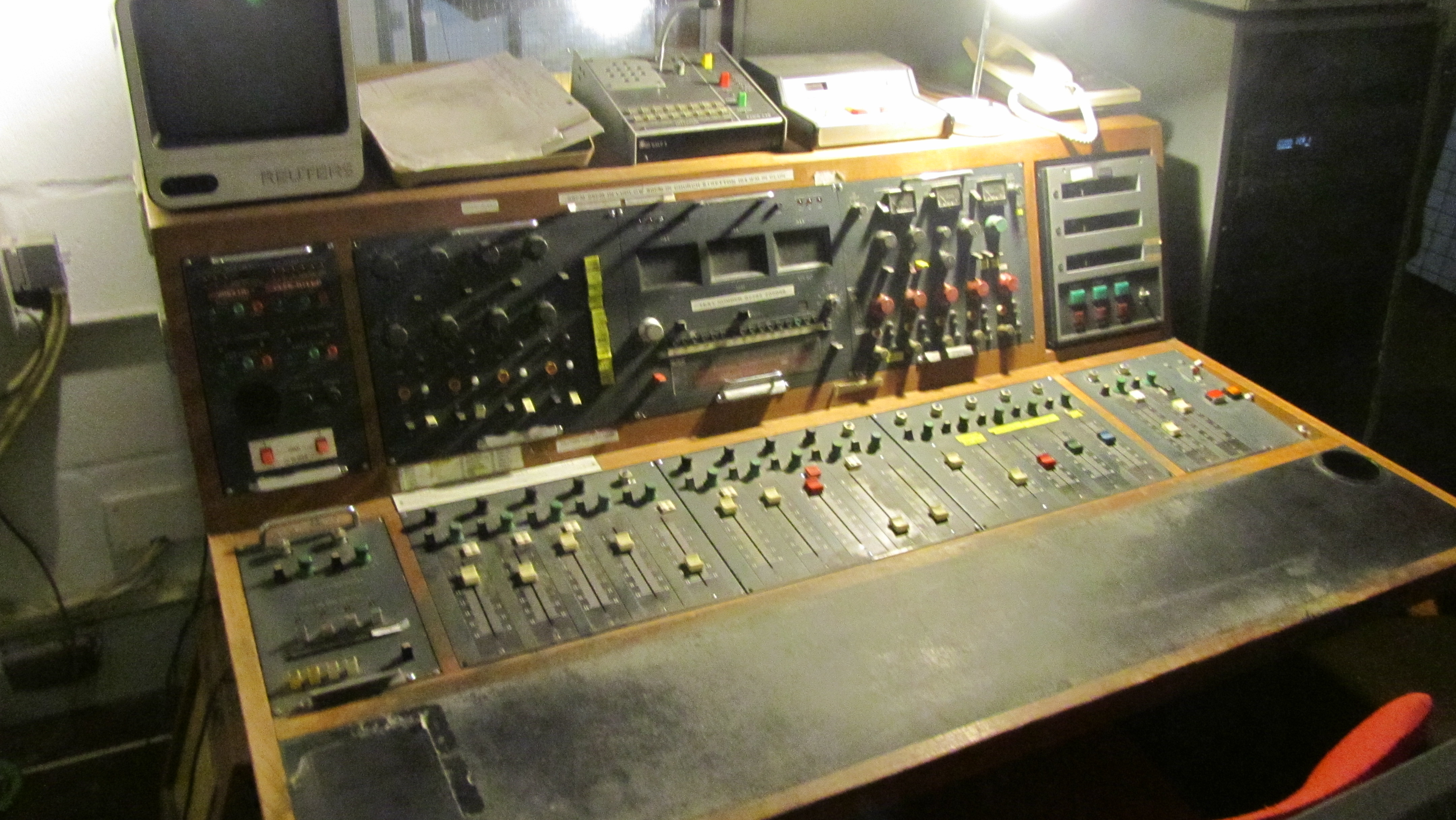
BBC mixing desk at Hack Green Secret Nuclear Bunker.

The BBC had studios and production equipment at many government nuclear bunkers such as the Central Government War Headquarters at Corsham and the regional seats of government.

By the end of the decade, existing transmitters had been fitted with emergency diesel generators and fallout protection.

From the 1980s, the BBC planned to broadcast for only a few hours a day and for a few minutes each hour, the intention being to conserve the batteries in domestic radios. There was to be no entertainment content for this reason and so that official messages could get through. With the end of the Cold War, the BBC stood down the service in 1992 and deactivated the studios and emergency transmitter networks as surplus to requirements. Many of these studios have become exhibits in bunkers, like the Kelvedon Hatch Secret Nuclear Bunker, which have now been converted into museums.

=== Post-Cold War ===
With the Cold War having ended, the BBC and British Telecom developed the National Attack Warning System in 2003. This system was able to warn by television, radio and telephone (the latter only in some areas) of an impending attack using existing infrastructure. The BBC was capable of doing so within ten minutes using their existing broadcasting procedures. By the time of the 2011 digital switchover, this was becoming obsolete because television and radio have limited warning capability.

According to a report in the Daily Telegraph, there were suggestions during the 1990s that a modern version of Peter Donaldson's post-attack message would be recorded by Jill Dando, Joanna Lumley, or Carol Vorderman.

Under the Communications Act 2003, the government still has the legal right (acting via Ofcom) to take over editorial control of non-BBC radio and television services in the event of a national emergency. Equivalent provision is made for BBC services in the BBC Agreement:

"If it appears to any UK Government Minister that an emergency has arisen, that Minister may request that the BBC broadcast or otherwise distribute any announcement or other programme."

— An Agreement Between His Majesty's Secretary of State for Culture, Media and Sport and the British Broadcasting Corporation

== Operation ==
The decision to activate the WTBS would have been taken at Cabinet level late in the crisis phase. On being given the order, the BBC, ITV, S4C and Channel 4 were to suspend normal programming, broadcast the frequencies for the WTBS (these frequencies would also be provided in newspapers) along with a list of probable targets, and go off-air an hour later. (Note: This "Announcements Hour"/"A-Hour" would have only been a true hour in the case of television broadcasting and in the case of transmissions from Droitwich Long-wave. Transmissions from medium frequency and VHF transmitters would have instead lasted for thirty minutes only, with the remaining thirty minutes being spent off-air in order to change wavelengths where needed and to generally allow the WTBS network to be set up.) At this point, known as "National Hour" or "N-Hour" for short, one single national programme would have been broadcast on BBC Radio 4 from Wood Norton. This would have consisted of official government announcements and information interspersed with filler material, such as music, news, and warnings. The BBC would need forty-eight hours' notice to prepare for the WTBS plus a further two to four hours' notice when WTBS commencement was authorised, and in any case BBC planning called for N-Hour to not be implemented until the last possible moment in order to maintain national morale (and to permit the television broadcast of Protect and Survive instructional films). The four-minute warning itself was to have been injected from a special studio at Broadcasting House and broadcast nationally on all television and radio stations when a coded signal from RAF High Wycombe was given. This studio would also have been used by government ministers to broadcast messages and announcements until the government left London late in the crisis phase (or during the precautionary period).

After an attack, there would also have been a regional service tailored to local needs located in regional seats of government. Regional controllers were to use these smaller BBC studios to give out local messages to communities and would have been staffed by BBC personnel. If conventional air attacks destroyed peacetime broadcasting facilities, the Wartime Broadcasting Service would also have been activated.

Regular drills and training exercises were held to give an air of realism, but many BBC staff saw them as pointless or declined to serve during a national emergency because they would not be allowed to take their families with them. One anonymous insider said, "I can't blame them for deciding there were better ways to go than to sit in a bunker with a group of local radio engineers."

== Programmes for broadcast ==
Initially, an introductory statement was to be broadcast. The 1975 BBC War Book contained a version which explicitly described the WTBS as a BBC operation, reminded listeners of the country's division into Home Defence Regions, and stated that the broadcasts would consist of both WTBS transmissions and any transmissions made by a Regional Commissioner; the announcement would then list the areas falling within each Home Defence Region and the appropriate WTBS frequencies for said areas. Another (Note: Julie McDowall's Attack Warning Red!, which contains this other version, does not provide a date for it in the body text nor in the endnotes.) version of the introductory broadcast merely announced that all national broadcasting now fell under the auspices of the WTBS, that listeners should stay tuned to its frequency until further notice, and that a timetable of broadcasts would be provided to preserve radio battery life. (Note: The British public would have been advised to start using battery-powered radio sets prior to WTBS activation.) A region-by-region broadcast would then commence to ensure that listeners were tuned to the transmitter best suited to their particular locality.

In the event of a nuclear attack on the United Kingdom, the WTBS would be used to deliver the four-minute warning if the service had been set up by then; if not, or if a surprise attack was under way, the BBC proper would broadcast the warning. Afterwards, a post-attack statement would be broadcast confirming a nuclear strike had hit the country and warning of the dangers of fallout. It would have been broadcast every two hours on all radio frequencies set aside for the BBC for the first twelve hours after the attack. The statement was recorded by Peter Donaldson, chief continuity announcer for BBC Radio 4. The script, which was released by the BBC in October 2008, reads as follows:

This is the Wartime Broadcasting Service. This country has been attacked with nuclear weapons. Communications have been severely disrupted, and the number of casualties and the extent of the damage are not yet known. We shall bring you further information as soon as possible. Meanwhile, stay tuned to this wavelength, stay calm and stay in your own house.
Remember there is nothing to be gained by trying to get away. By leaving your homes you could be exposing yourself to greater danger.
If you leave, you may find yourself without food, without water, without accommodation and without protection. Radioactive fall-out, which follows a nuclear explosion, is many times more dangerous if you are directly exposed to it in the open. Roofs and walls offer substantial protection. The safest place is indoors. Make sure gas and other fuel supplies are turned off and that all fires are extinguished. If mains water is available, this can be used for fire-fighting. You should also refill all your containers for drinking water after the fires have been put out, because the mains water supply may not be available for very long.
Water must not be used for flushing lavatories: until you are told that lavatories may be used again, other toilet arrangements must be made. Use your water only for essential drinking and cooking purposes. Water means life. Don't waste it.
Make your food stocks last: ration your supply, because it may have to last for 14 days or more. If you have fresh food in the house, use this first to avoid wasting it: food in tins will keep.
If you live in an area where a fall-out warning has been given, stay in your fall-out room until you are told it is safe to come out. When the immediate danger has passed the sirens will sound a steady note. The "all clear" message will also be given on this wavelength. If you leave the fall-out room to go to the lavatory or replenish food or water supplies, do not remain outside the room for a minute longer than is necessary.
Do not, in any circumstances, go outside the house. Radioactive fall-out can kill. You cannot see it or feel it, but it is there. If you go outside, you will bring danger to your family and you may die. Stay in your fall-out room until you are told it is safe to come out or you hear the "all clear" on the sirens.
Here are the main points again: Stay in your own homes, and if you live in an area where a fall-out warning has been given stay in your fall-out room, until you are told it is safe to come out. The message that the immediate danger has passed will be given by the sirens and repeated on this wavelength. Make sure that the gas and all fuel supplies are turned off and that all fires are extinguished. Water must be rationed, and used only for essential drinking and cooking purposes. It must not be used for flushing lavatories. Ration your food supply—it may have to last for 14 days or more.
We shall repeat this broadcast in two hours' time. Stay tuned to this wavelength, but switch your radios off now to save your batteries until we come on the air again. That is the end of this broadcast.

Jim Black, a BBC executive, compiled a schedule consisting of classic BBC drama, comedy, and religious programmes to maintain morale. These included Round The Horne, I'm Sorry, I Haven't A Clue, Hancock's Half Hour, and the Rodgers and Hammerstein musical The Sound of Music. Drama programmes included The Afternoon Play and Thirty-Minute Theatre. From the 1980s to the WTBS's 1992 standdown, the entertainment content was dropped and only official announcements would have been broadcast in order to conserve energy.

== See also ==
- UK Emergency Alert System
- Four-minute warning
- Protect and Survive
- Duck and cover
- Transition to war
- BBC Radio 4 (the designated national broadcaster in a national emergency)
- Central Government War Headquarters
- Civil Contingencies Secretariat
- RAF Rudloe Manor
- Corsham Computer Centre
- Continuity of government
- Hack Green Secret Nuclear Bunker
- WGU-20
- Emergency Alert System
- Emergency Broadcast System
- CONELRAD
- Mobile phone alerts in the United Kingdom

== Sources ==
- "BBC post attack broadcasting plans". Archived from the original on 29 May 2010.
- File 16 Civil Defence Communications and Warning, from Subterranea Britannia access-date=2009-10-04
- Script of the BBC's post-attack statement access-date=2009-10-04
