= KFM =

KFM or Kfm may refer to:

== Radio stations ==
- Kfm 94.5, South Africa
- Kfm (Ireland), Ireland
- KFM Radio, Greater Manchester, England
- KMFM West Kent, Kent, England

== Organisations and companies ==
- Knights of Father Matthew, a catholic temperance society that originated in Ireland
- Komet Flight Motor, an Italian aircraft engine manufacturer
- Kommunistiska Förbundet Marxist-Leninisterna, former Swedish communist party
- Kronofogdemyndigheten, Swedish government agency handling debt collection, distraint and evictions

== Other uses ==
- Kearny fallout meter, an expedient radiation meter, which can be made from household items
- Kelvin probe force microscope
- The KDE file manager, now replaced by Konqueror
- Keysi Fighting Method, a martial art with roots in Jeet Kun Do, Wing Chun, and street fighting
- The Kentucky Fried Movie, an American comedy film, released in 1977 and directed by John Landis
- "KFM", a song by Madi Diaz on Weird Faith
