= Ark Two Shelter =

Nuclear fallout shelter in Canada

Coordinates: 44°9′35.19″N 80°12′2.22″W

The Ark Two Shelter is a nuclear fallout shelter built by Bruce Beach (14 April 1934 – 10 May 2021) in the village of Horning's Mills (north of Toronto, Ontario). The shelter first became habitable in 1980 and has been continuously expanded and improved since then. The 930 m^{2} (10,000 sq ft) shelter is composed of 42 school buses, which were buried underground as patterns for concrete that was then poured over to provide the main structure, onto which up to 5 meters (14 feet) of earth were piled to provide fallout protection.

With construction beginning in the early 1980s (during the Cold War), the shelter was designed to accommodate as many as five hundred people for the length of time required to allow the widespread nuclear fallout to decay to a level allowing a safe return to the surface after a cataclysmic nuclear event.

Powered by redundant diesel generators, the heavily fortified ("virtually impenetrable to anything short of a direct nuclear strike") shelter includes two commercial kitchens, full plumbing (including a private well for potable water and a motel-sized septic tank), three months' worth of diesel, a radio-based communications centre, a chapel, and a decontamination room.

Ark Two is equipped with a communications room capable of broadcasting locally on the FM broadcast band and throughout Canada and the United States on the AM and Shortwave bands. A particularly novel feature is a collapsible, weather-balloon-deployed antenna, capable of being launched from within the shelter. All Ark Two communication equipment is EMP-hardened and generator-powered so as to be able to transmit survival information to the general public in the event of nuclear war.

Beach did not charge money for admission to the shelter, instead guaranteeing individuals admission in return for sweat equity and active involvement in the Ark Two communities' various activities. In addition, "Everyone is welcome here, regardless of religion, race, nationality, political views..." In return for the promise of safe haven in times of nuclear attack, a person residing in nearby areas might be expected to, for example, work at the shelter several weekends each year, assisting in the routine maintenance or continuing renovations of the facility. A large percentage of the shelter population is expected to be children, as the primary purpose of the shelter is to serve as an "underground orphanage, a place where a new generation could be saved from nuclear apocalypse," which, according to Beach, would otherwise wipe out over 80% of the world's population. "We're going to say to people: 'Well, we have room for your children, but we don't have room for you.' That's the nature of life... this is the lifeboat."

Beach believed that the majority of preppers are too concerned with personal survival, when they should be focused on reconstructing the world after a cataclysmic disaster. He ran an online "reconstruction network" (the "SAFE" community) through which he shared information about Ark Two and his evacuation plans.

Ark Two was featured in Beach's interview for National Geographic's Doomsday Preppers, episode 8: "It's Gonna Get Worse". It was also featured on the Global Television Network series 16:9, and on the Showtime series Penn & Teller: Bullshit! episode "End of the World" and How the World Ends - "Nostradamus".

Beach died on May 10, 2021, of a heart attack.

Beach has authored two related books: Society After Doomsday and TRIAD Individual Networking: Preparedness For Disastrous Times.

== See also ==
- Nuclear War Survival Skills
- Emergency Government Headquarters
