= Bomb shelter =

Reinforced space to protect people from bombing attacks

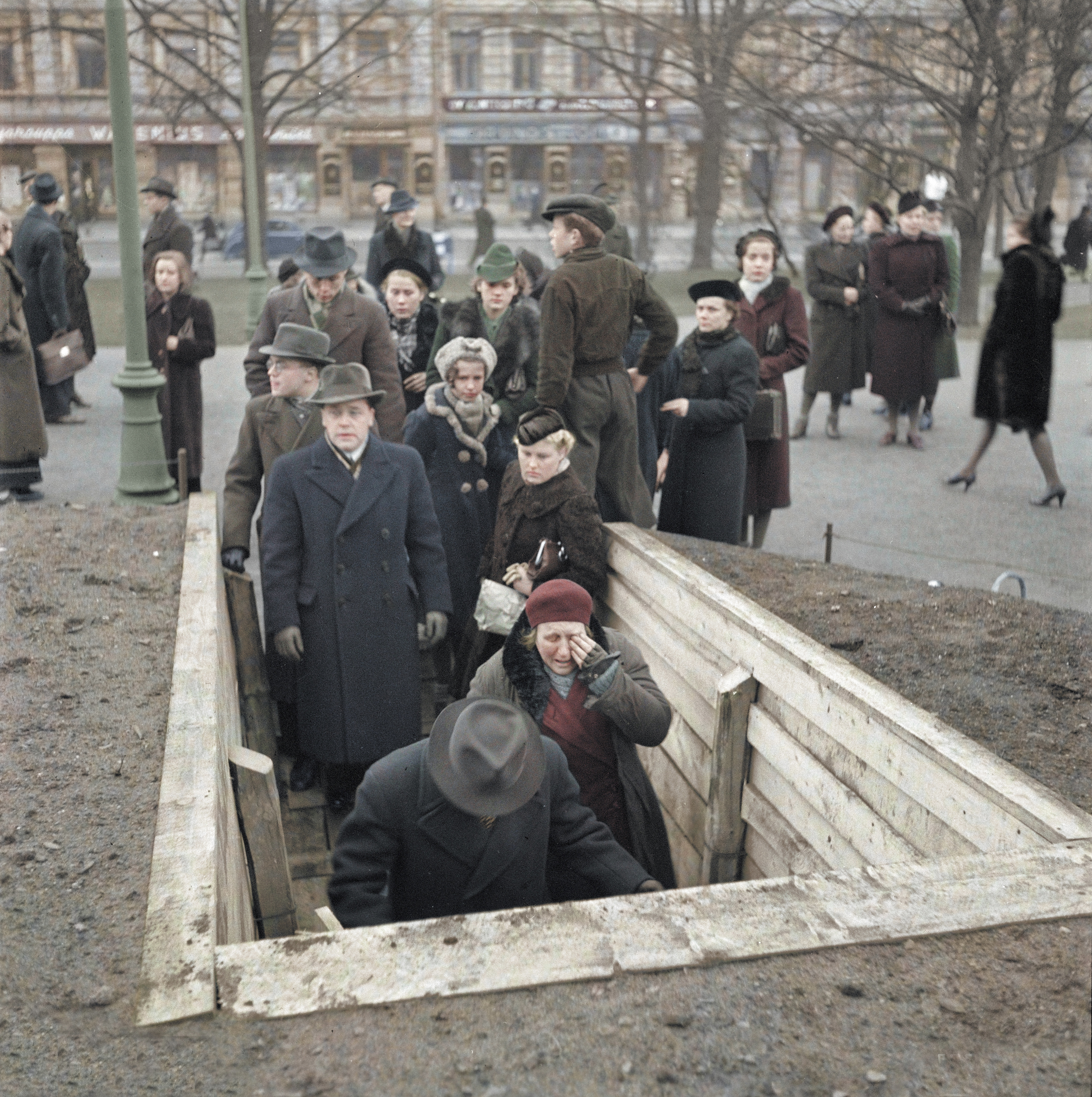
Finnish civilians enter a bomb shelter in Helsinki as air-raid sirens start, with Soviet bombers inbound during the Winter War.

A bomb shelter is a structure designed to provide protection against the effects of a bomb.

== Types of shelter ==
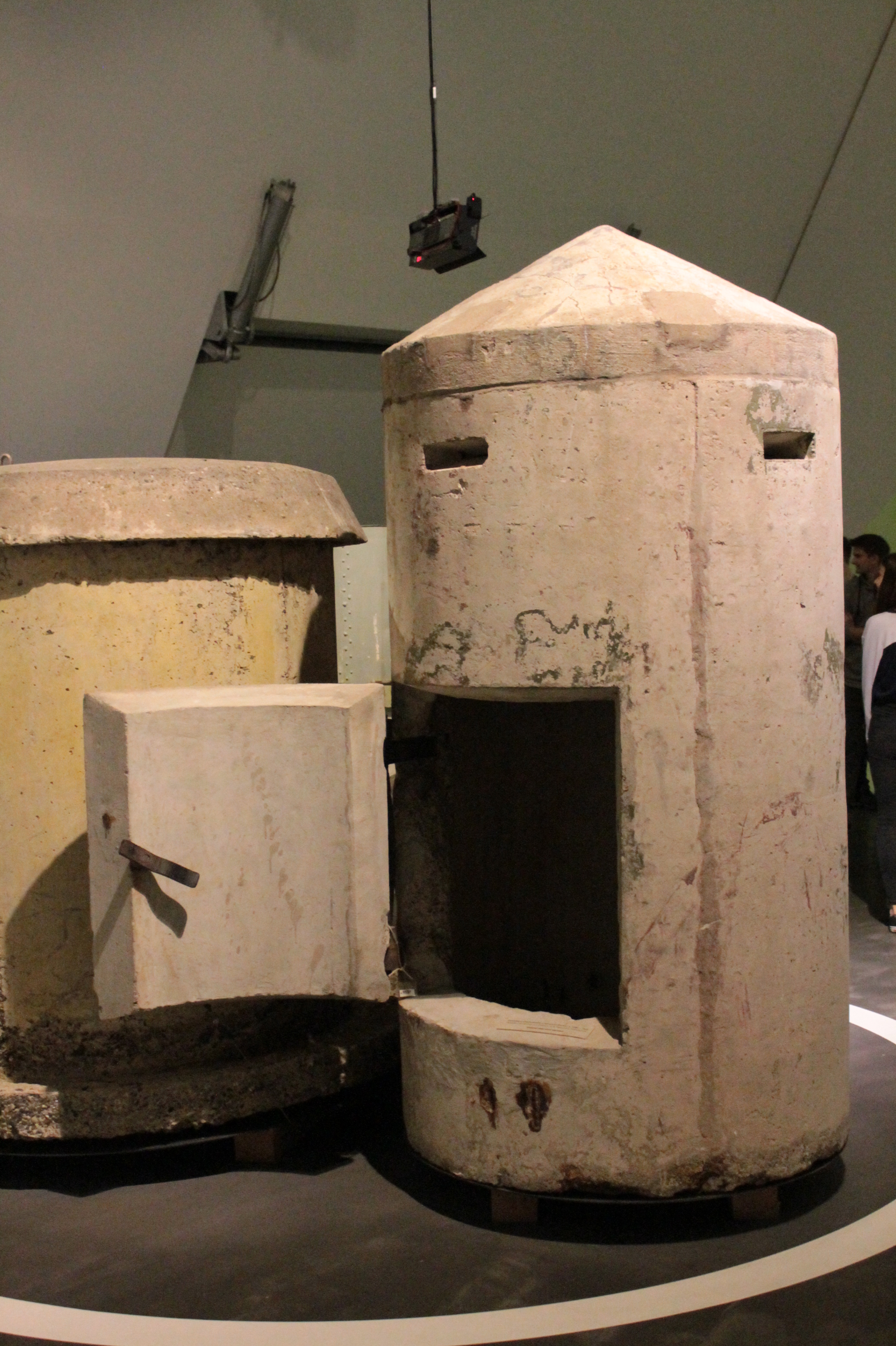
One-man shelter from WW2 Germany, Bundeswehr Military History Museum, Dresden

Different kinds of bomb shelters are configured to protect against different kinds of attack and strengths of hostile explosives.

=== Air raid shelter ===
An air raid shelter is a structure built to protect against bomber planes dropping bombs over a large area. These were commonly seen during World War II, such as the "Anderson shelters" of the United Kingdom.

=== Fallout shelter ===
A fallout shelter is a shelter designed specifically for a nuclear war, with thick walls made from materials intended to block the radiation from fallout resulting from a nuclear explosion. Many such shelters were constructed as civil defense measures during the Cold War. A blast shelter protects against more conventional bomb blasts. Its main purpose is to protect from shock waves and overpressure and also from earthquake.

=== Bunker ===
While these forms of bomb shelters are equally amenable to civilians and military use, a bunker is more commonly associated with military use. A bunker may be hastily assembled as part of an ongoing military advance, or to hold a line. Bunkers have also been popular with the survivalism subculture.

== History ==
While military units have long built defensive structures to protect against various kinds of hostile bombardment, the use of the phrase "bomb shelter" can be traced at least as far back as 1833. A dictionary from that year defines a "casement" as "a bomb-proof shelter for soldiers in garrison". In 1881, the United States War Department issued a report in which it indicated that the defenses of Charleston, South Carolina included construction at Fort Moultrie of:

...eleven permanent gun-platforms and breast-height walls, bonnets on the traverses, a portion of the masonry and all the earth covering of the bomb-proof shelter, the postern gallery, a part of the earth covering of the magazines, and an earthen cover face on the channel front.

The shortening of this phrase to the conventional "bomb shelter" appears in print at least as early as 1895.

=== Mobile bomb shelter ===
These are moveable shelters made of concrete blocks to provide shelter in public spaces where no permanent structures are available.
