= Fallout Protection =

1961 United States federal government booklet

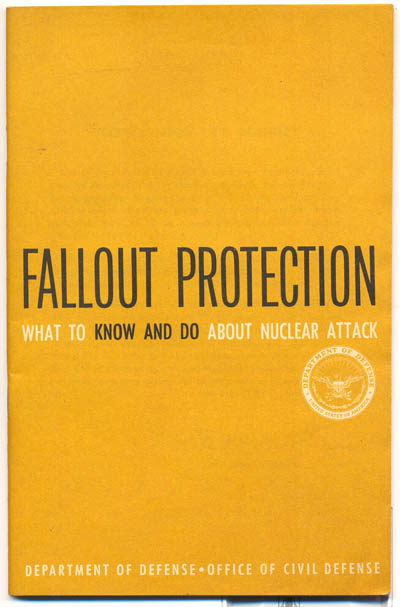
Cover of Fallout Protection, 1961

Fallout Protection: What To Know And Do About Nuclear Attack was an official United States federal government booklet released in December 1961 by the United States Department of Defense and the Office of Civil Defense. The first page of the book is a note from then-U.S. Secretary of Defense Robert McNamara explaining that the booklet is a 48 page book made for the result of the first task he was given when he assumed responsibility for the Federal Civil Defense Program in August 1961. The task, assigned by John F. Kennedy, was to "give the American people the facts they need to know about the dangers of a thermonuclear attack and what they can do to protect themselves."

== Subject matter ==
Much more straightforward about the dangers of atomic weapons than Survival Under Atomic Attack, and published in the era of the hydrogen bomb and the ICBM, the book first explains general information and hazards of nuclear weapons, fallout and radiation. Second, it covers community fallout shelters, improvised fallout shelters and supplies that one ought to have ready in case of a nuclear attack. There is a brief section outlining "emergency housekeeping" which covers water and food conservation and first aid for the time spent in the shelter. Last, the booklet mentions recovery and how to clean up the fallout.

== See also ==
- Fallout: An American Nuclear Tragedy
- List of books about nuclear issues
- Protect and Survive
- Survivalism
- Nuclear War Survival Skills
- Duck and Cover (film)
