= Sonnenberg Tunnel =

Road tunnel in Lucerne, Switzerland

Coordinates: 47.038653°N 8.294287°E

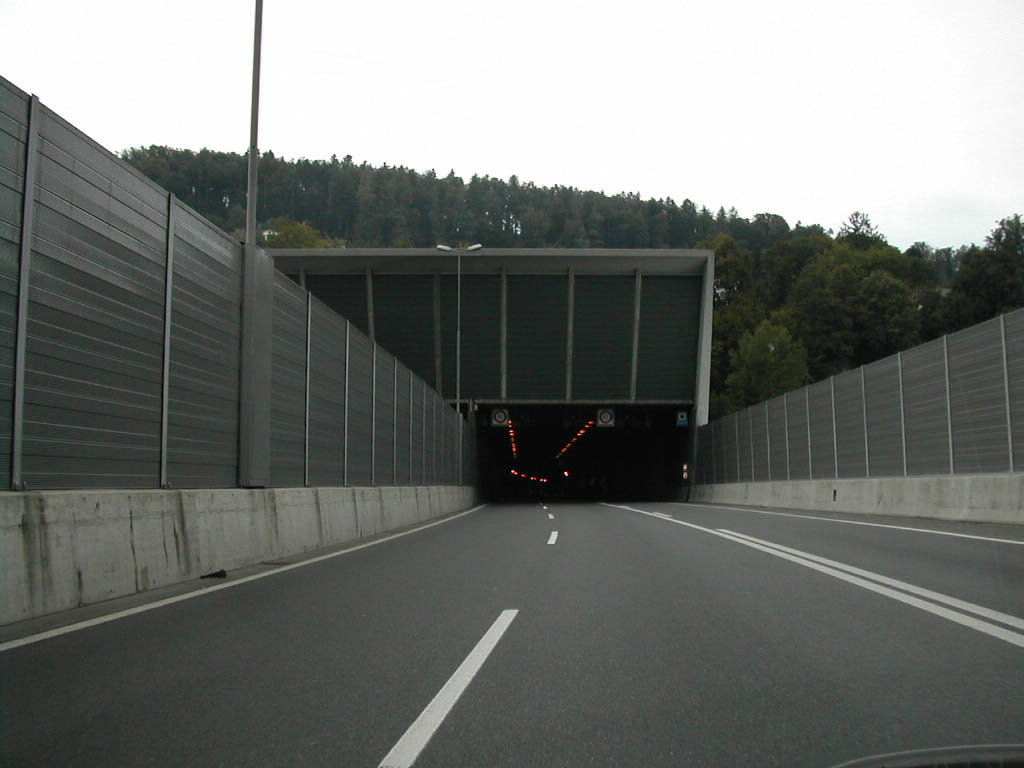
The south entrance of the Sonnenberg Tunnel, in 2005.

The Sonnenberg Tunnel is a 1,550 m (5,090 ft) long motorway tunnel, constructed between 1971 and 1976 and located in Lucerne, Switzerland. At its completion it was also the world's largest civilian nuclear fallout shelter, designed to protect 20,000 civilians in the eventuality of war or disaster.

== Motorway tunnel ==
The A2 motorway from Chiasso to Basel passes through the tunnel and carries around 55,000 vehicles a day. There are tentative plans to construct a bypass to replace the section of the motorway that leads through Lucerne, which includes the Sonnenberg and Reussport tunnels.

== Civil defense shelter ==
Based on a federal law from 1963, Switzerland aims to provide nuclear fallout shelters for the entire population of the country. The construction of a new tunnel near an urban centre was seen as an opportunity to provide shelter space for a large number of people at the same time. The installations that allowed the tunnel to be converted into a fallout shelter cost around $32.5 million, of which approximately $5 million were borne by the municipality of Lucerne. The shelter consisted of the two motorway tunnels (one per direction of travel), each capable of holding 10,000 people in 64 person subdivisions. A seven-story cavern between the tunnels contained shelter infrastructure including a command post, an emergency hospital, a radio studio, a telephone centre, prison cells and ventilation machines. The shelter was designed to withstand the blast from a 1 megaton nuclear explosion 1 kilometre (0.62 mi) away. The blast doors at the tunnel portals are 1.5 metres (4 ft 11 in) thick and weigh 350 tonnes (340 long tons; 390 short tons).

The logistical problems of maintaining a population of 20,000 in close confines were not thoroughly explored, and testing the installation was difficult because it required closing the motorway and rerouting the usual traffic. The only large-scale test, a five-day exercise in 1987 to practice converting the road tunnels into usable shelters, revealed many problems: among other things, it took 24 hours to fully close all four blast doors, and it proved impossible to set up the 20,000 beds within reasonable time. Afterwards, the shelter's capacity was reassessed at 10,000–17,000. Doubts about the tunnel's viability as a shelter remained.

After the end of the Cold War, the high maintenance costs seemed unjustified for an installation that was clearly geared towards use during wartime and couldn't be readied within hours for short-term use after disasters. In 2006, after a long political debate, it was decided to abandon the road tunnel's secondary civil defense function and instead convert the central seven story cavern into a shelter with a more modest capacity of 2,000. Since 2008 people can visit the cavern on guided tours and to get an insight into the bunker world of the Cold War.
