= Robert Blakeley =

American graphic designer (1922–2017)

- Born: August 30, 1922; Ogden, Utah, U.S.
- Died: October 25, 2017 (aged 95); Jacksonville, Florida, U.S.
- Known for: Design of fallout shelter sign
- Military career
- Allegiance: USA
- Branch: Marine Corps
- Service years: 1943–1945; 1951–1952

Robert Wilson Blakeley (August 30, 1922 – October 25, 2017) was an American graphic designer, known for making the fallout shelter sign. While working for the Army Corps of Engineers, Blakeley designed the sign as a civil defense measure during the Cold War.

Born in Ogden, Utah, Blakeley attended public schools and served with the Marine Corps, seeing combat during World War II. He graduated from the University of California, Berkeley, in 1954 and was the president of Toastmasters.

== Personal life ==
Blakeley was born on August 30, 1922, in Ogden, Utah, to Robert G. Blakeley and Elsie Jean (Wilson) Blakeley. One of four children, he attended Weber College and Utah State University.

In 1944, he married Shirley Jeane Brown, with whom he had one son, David Bruce Eppenberger. Robert and Jeane divorced some time later. In 1952, he married Dorothy McArthur, with whom he had two children, Dorothy "Dot" Carver and Robert. She died in 1992. In 2003, he married Irene Allan Davis. Blakeley died in a Brookdale senior living community in Jacksonville, Florida, on October 25, 2017, from complications from a bacterial infection.

== Career ==
In 1943, Blakeley joined the Marine Corps. During the 1945 invasion of Iwo Jima during World War II, Blakeley was a sergeant major of the 4th Marine Division. He later served during the Korean War in 1951 and 1952, one of the "Chosin Few" at the Battle of Chosin Reservoir.

At the University of California, Berkeley, he studied architecture and graduated in 1954 with a master's degree in business administration. He worked for two years with the Veterans Administration before joining the Army Corps of Engineers in 1956. With the Corps, Blakeley led administrative work for over 60 construction projects as its civilian manager. He retired from the Corps as chief of administrative services in 1981.

He joined Toastmasters International in 1958, becoming its international president from 1976 to 1977. Blakeley helped change the organization's bylaws to allow women to join and expanded the group by traveling across the U.S., Africa, and Europe.

=== Fallout shelter sign ===
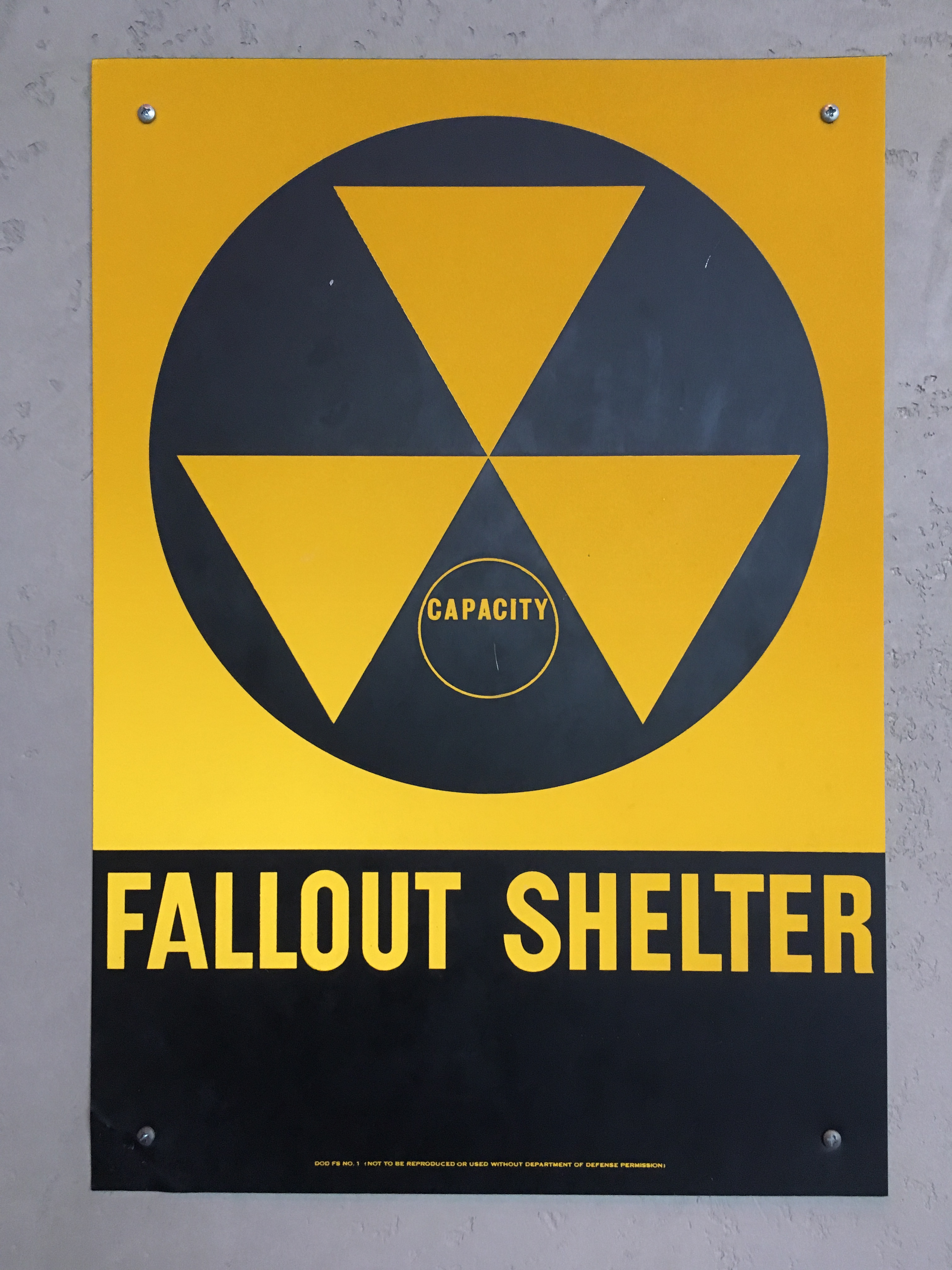
A fallout shelter sign at the Smithsonian in Washington, D.C.

Major General Keith R. Barney tasked Blakeley with creating the fallout shelter sign in 1961. Blakeley decided that to be most durable the signs must be made from metal. As they needed to be easy to find in the dark, he chose to use orange-yellow and black, with an image created by graphic design firm Blair Inc. and possibly based on an image from on Clarence P. Hornung's Handbook of Designs, consisting of three upside-down equilateral triangles on a black background and the words "Fallout Shelter" in large letters. Blakeley also wanted the reflective paint to easily illuminate from a cigarette lighter.

His design was approved by Special Assistant to the Secretary of the Army Powell Pierpoint. Blakeley suggested a $700,000 production run of one million interior signs by Alfray Products from Coshocton, Ohio and 400,000 exterior signs by Minnesota Mining and Manufacturing (3M).

Blakeley debuted the completed products at the Westchester County Office Building in White Plains, New York, on October 4, 1961. The signs became an icon for the anti-war protests and counterculture of the 1960s and were featured in popular culture, including Bob Dylan's 1965 album cover for Bringing It All Back Home. Blakeley recounted a story from when his children were young and saw the ubiquitous signs:

We'd go down the street, and one of the kids would say, "Hey, Dad, there's one of your signs." But, you know, other than that it's just like many of the other things that happen in life. It's just like one of those routine things.
