= Cresson Kearny =

Cresson Henry Kearny (/ˈkɑːrni/; January 7, 1914 – December 18, 2003) wrote several survival-related books based primarily on research performed at Oak Ridge National Laboratory.

== Career ==
Kearny attended Texas Military Institute in the 1930s, where he became the commanding officer of the cadet corps, a champion runner and rifle shot, and valedictorian of his class. He attended Mercersburg Academy in Pennsylvania before earning a degree in civil engineering at Princeton University, graduating summa cum laude in 1937. He won a Rhodes Scholarship and went on to earn two degrees in geology at the University of Oxford. During the Sudeten Crisis he acted as a courier for an underground group helping anti-Nazis escape from Czechoslovakia.

Following graduation from Oxford, Kearny joined a Royal Geographical Society expedition in the Peruvian Andes. He then worked as an exploration geologist for Standard Oil in the Orinoco jungles of Venezuela, where he became familiar with equipment and tools of the native inhabitants of the region. He later used the information gained from this experience to develop specialized jungle equipment for U.S. military forces.

In 1940, Kearny went on active duty as an infantry reserve lieutenant in the United States Army. Recognized for his knowledge of jungle travel and use of specialized tools and equipment, Kearny was soon assigned to Panama as the Jungle Experiments Officer of the Panama Mobile Force, and was promoted to captain. In that capacity he was able to invent, improve, and/or field test much of the specialized jungle equipment and rations used by U.S. infantrymen in World War II. Adoption of the jungle field ration and the jungle hammock as standard equipment by the US Army in World War II is credited to Kearny, along with improvements to many other items of tropical gear, such as the Panama-soled jungle boot and the M1942 Machete. In recognition of his service, he was soon promoted to major and awarded the Legion of Merit.

In 1943, he married May Willacy Eskridge of San Antonio.

Kearny later volunteered for duty with the Office of Strategic Services (OSS), where he served as a demolition specialist in southern China in 1944. As Japanese forces threatened to overwhelm Chinese defenses in southeast China, he walked night and day to escape capture. After contracting a serious viral disease during that campaign, he was bedridden for many months and partially crippled for several years. After a long convalescence, he retired from active duty with the U.S. Army.

In 1961 he took a position doing civil defense research with the Hudson Institute. In 1964 he joined the Oak Ridge National Laboratory civil defense project. During the Vietnam War, Kearny served as a civilian advisor to the U.S. Army, making several trips to the theater of operations. Much of the supporting research that went into his most famous work, Nuclear War Survival Skills (NWSS), was conducted during the 1970s. Kearny included a study on how the US might be affected by a potential nuclear war from the Sino-Soviet split, specifically focusing on the question; what would be the severity and how might the US deal with contamination of CONUS milk supplies that might result from the "trans-pacific" nuclear fallout that would originate over China. Along with other more long-term survival publications such as "Maintaining nutritional adequacy during a prolonged food crisis [Basic foods for post-nuclear attack use]".

He died in 2003 at the age of 89.

In a New York Times obituary, his daughter Stephanie commented: "Throughout his life he believed in being prepared for trouble."

== Published work ==
Kearny's most notable work is Nuclear War Survival Skills (NWSS). It describes civil defense research to determine the methods for ordinary citizens to build effective expedient shelters in a short period of time. It includes "MacGyver-like" plans for the Kearny air pump (KAP), Kearny fallout meter (KFM) and blast doors designed to be published in a newspaper prior to an attack. This book is in the public domain and is available for purchase, as well as free download online, from the Oregon Institute of Science and Medicine.

His other works include Jungle Snafus ... and Remedies, a book on the history of development of specialized equipment for use by military forces in jungle regions, and Will Civil Defense Work?

== Bibliography ==
- Jungle Snafus...And Remedies, Oregon Institute of Science and Medicine (1996), ISBN 1-884067-10-7
- Nuclear War Survival Skills ISBN 0-942487-01-X
- The KFM, A Homemade Yet Accurate and Dependable Fallout Meter (Co-author) ORNL-5040, January 1978
- Will Civil Defense Work?, Greenhaven Press, June 1985, ISBN 99968-1-553-6

== See also ==
- Bruce D. Clayton
- Fallout shelter
- Nuclear War Survival Skills
- Office of Strategic Services
- Retreat (survivalism)
- Survivalism
