= Blast shelter =

Place where people can go to protect themselves from blasts and explosions

A blast shelter is a structure designed to protect occupants from blasts and explosions, such as those caused by bombs or hazardous worksites such as oil and gas refineries or petrochemical facilities. It differs from a fallout shelter in that its main purpose is to protect from shock waves and overpressure rather than radioactive precipitation. It is also possible for a shelter to protect from both blasts and fallout.

Blast shelters are a vital form of protection against nuclear attacks, airstrikes, and floods, and are used in civil defense. There are above-ground, below-ground, dedicated, dual-purpose, and potential blast shelters. Dedicated blast shelters, or bunkers, are built specifically for blast protection. Dual-purpose blast shelters are existing structures with blast-protective properties that have been modified to accommodate people seeking blast protection. Potential blast shelters are existing structures or geological features with blast-protective properties that can be used to protect against blasts.

== Design ==
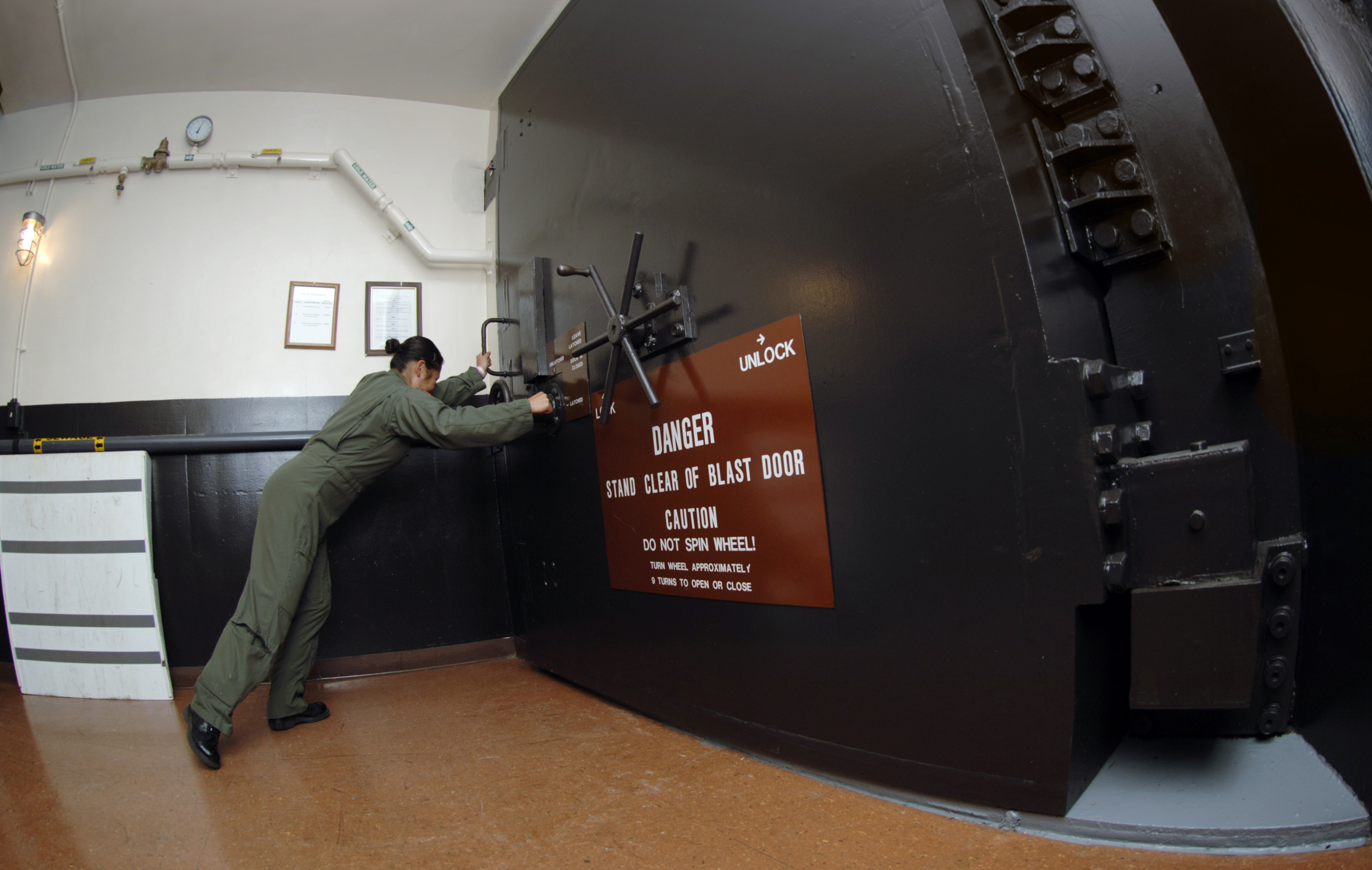
Blast doors in a missile control bunker at Minot Air Force Base, North Dakota.

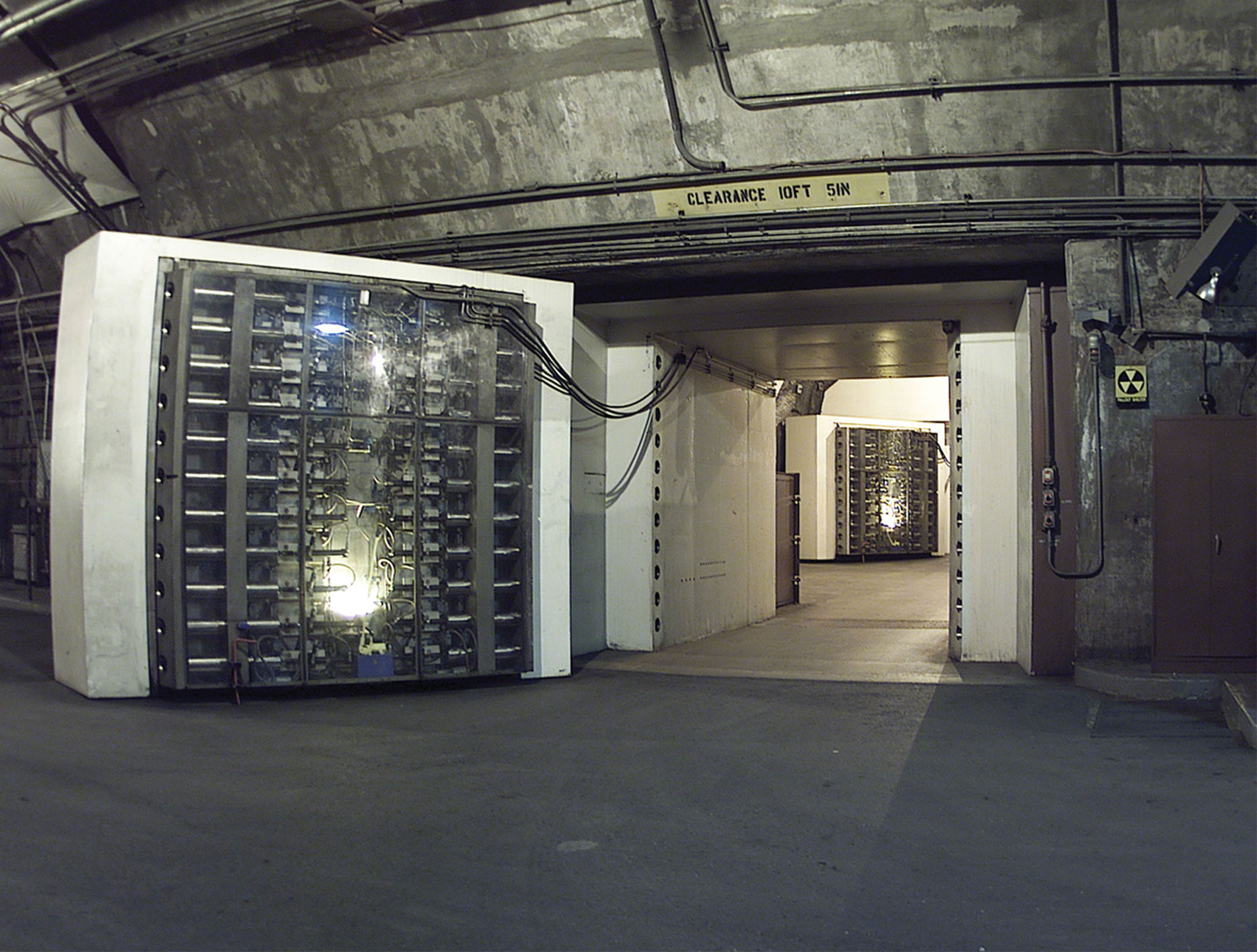
The 25-ton blast door in the Cheyenne Mountain nuclear bunker is the main entrance to another blast door (background) beyond which the side tunnel branches into access tunnels to the main chambers.

Blast shelters deflect the blast wave from nearby explosions to prevent ear and internal injuries to people sheltering in the bunker. While frame buildings collapse from as little as 3 psi (20 kPa) of overpressure, blast shelters are regularly constructed to survive several hundred psi. This substantially decreases the likelihood that a bomb can harm the structure.

The basic plan is to provide a structure that is very strong in compression. The actual strength specification must be done individually, based on the nature and probability of the threat. A typical specification for a heavy civil defense shelter in Europe during the Cold War was an overhead explosion of a 500-kiloton weapon at a height of 500 meters. Such a weapon would be used to attack soft targets (factories, administrative centers, communications) in the area.

Only the most heavily bedrock-sheltered would stand a chance of surviving. However, in the countryside or in a suburb, the likely distance to the explosion is much larger, as it is improbable that anyone would waste an expensive nuclear device on such targets. The most common purpose-built structure is a steel-reinforced concrete vault or arch buried or located in the basement of a house.

Most expedient blast shelters are civil engineering structures that contain large buried tubes or pipes, such as sewage or rapid transit tunnels. Even these, however, require several additions to function properly: blast doors, air filtration and ventilation equipment, secondary exits, and air-proofing.

Improvised purpose-built blast shelters normally use earthen arches or vaults. To form these, a narrow (1–2-meter-wide) flexible tent of thin wood is placed in a deep trench (usually the apex of the tent is below grade), then covered with cloth or plastic, and then covered with 1–2 meters of tamped earth. Shelters of this type are approved field-expedient blast shelters in both the U.S. and China. Entrances are constructed from thick wooden frames. Blast valves are to be constructed from tire treads laid on thick wooden grids.

Nuclear bunkers must also deal with the lack of pressure that lasts for several seconds after the shock wave passes, and prompt radiation. The overburden and structure provide substantial radiation shielding, and the negative pressure is usually only 1/3 of the overpressure.

The doors must be at least as strong as the walls. The usual design is a trap door to minimize the size and expense. In dual-purpose shelters, which have a secondary peacetime use, the door may be normal. To reduce weight, the door is normally constructed of steel, with a fitted steel lintel and frame welded to the concrete reinforcement. The shelter should be located so that no combustible material is directly outside it.

If the door is on the surface and will be exposed to the blast wave, the edge of the door is normally counter-sunk in the frame so that the blast wave or a reflection cannot lift the edge. If possible, this should be avoided, and the door built so that it is sheltered from the blast wave by other structures. The most useful construction is to place the door behind a 90° turn in a corridor with an overpressure exit.

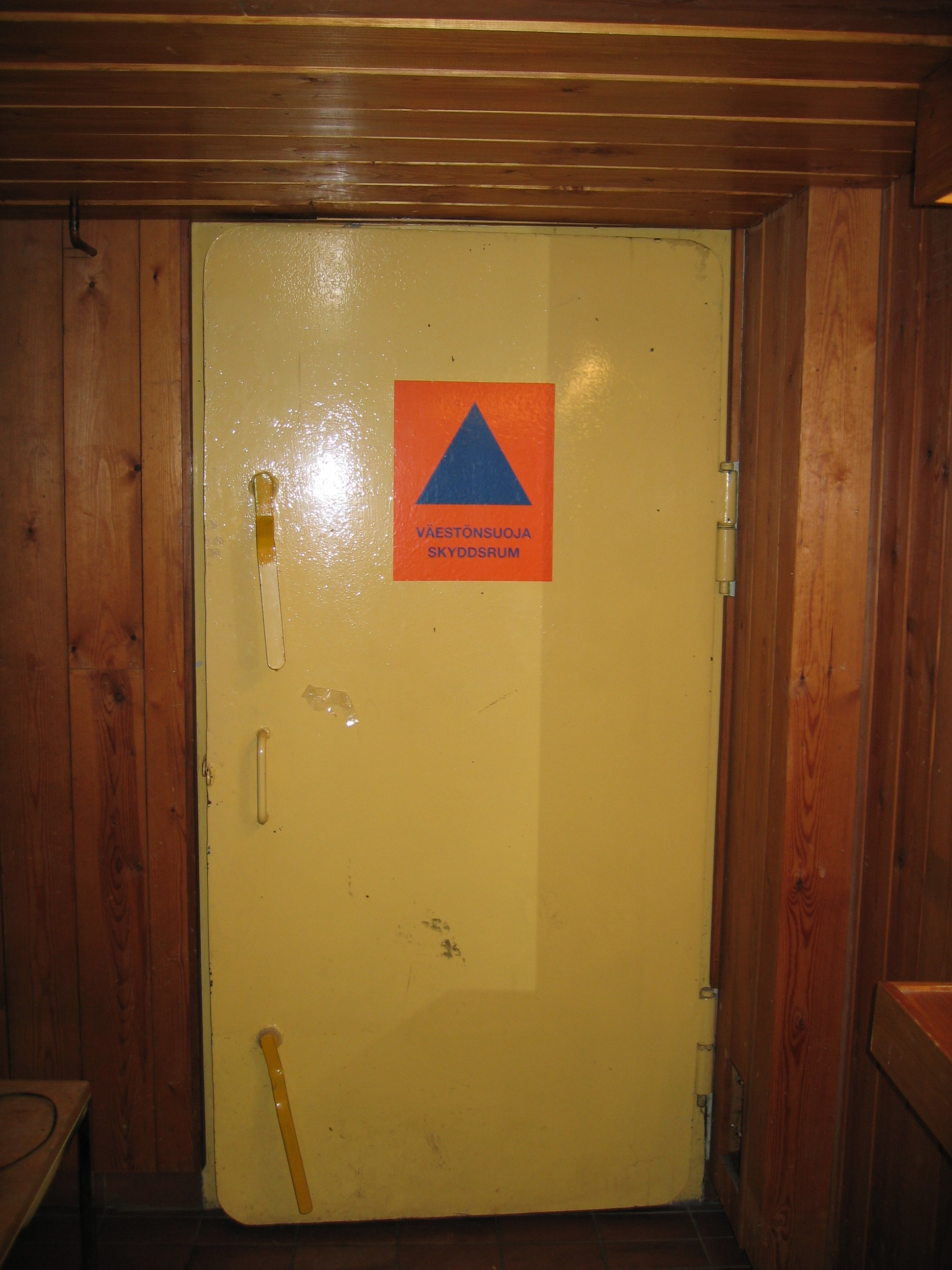
The door of a light civil defense shelter in Finland.

A bunker commonly has two doors, one of which is convenient for peacetime use, and the other as the door for the blast. Naturally, the shelter must always have a secondary exit that can be used if the primary door is blocked by debris. Door shafts may double as ventilation shafts to reduce digging, although this is usually unviable during an emergency.

A large ground shock can move the walls of a bunker several centimeters in a few milliseconds. Bunkers designed for large ground shocks must have sprung internal buildings, hammocks, or bean-bag chairs to protect inhabitants from the walls and floors. However, most civilian-built improvised shelters do not need these, as their structures cannot withstand a shock strong enough to injure occupants seriously.

Earth is an excellent insulator. In bunkers occupied for prolonged periods, adequate ventilation or air conditioning must be provided to prevent heat prostration. In bunkers designed for wartime use, manually operated ventilators must be provided because supplies of electricity or gas are unreliable. The simplest effective fan to cool a shelter is a wide, heavy frame with flaps that swing in the shelter's doorway and can be swung from ceiling hinges.

The flaps open in one direction and close in the other, pumping air. (This is a Kearny Air Pump, or KAP, named after the inventor Cresson Kearny.) Kearny asserts, based on field testing, that air filtration is not normally needed in a nuclear shelter. He asserts that fallout is either large enough to fall to the ground or so fine that it will not settle and thus has little bulk to emit radiation. However, if possible, shelters should have air filtration to stop chemical, biological, and nuclear impurities that may abound after an explosion.

Blast valves must protect ventilation openings in a bunker. A blast valve is closed by a shock wave, but otherwise remains open. If the bunker is in a built-up area, it may include water-cooling or an immersion tube and breathing tubes to protect inhabitants from fire storms. In these cases, the secondary exit is also most useful.

Bunkers must also protect the inhabitants from normal weather, including rain, summer heat, and winter cold. A normal form of rainproofing is to place plastic film on the bunker's main structure before burying it. Thick (5-mil or 125 μm), inexpensive polyethylene film serves quite well, because the overburden protects it from degradation by wind and sunlight. Naturally, a buried or basement-situated reinforced-concrete shelter usually has the normal appearance of a building.

When a house is purpose-built with a blast shelter, the normal location is a reinforced below-grade bathroom with large cabinets. In apartment houses, the shelter may double as storage space, as long as it can be swiftly emptied for its primary use. A shelter can easily be added in a new basement construction by taking an existing corner and adding two poured walls and a ceiling.

Some vendors offer blast shelters engineered to provide good protection for individual families at a modest cost. One common design approach uses fiber-reinforced plastic shells. Compressive protection may be provided by inexpensive earth arching. The overburden is designed to shield from radiation. To prevent the shelter from floating to the surface in high groundwater levels, some designs have a skirt held down by the overburden. A properly designed, properly installed home shelter does not become a sinkhole in the lawn. In Switzerland, which requires shelters for private apartment blocks and large private houses, the lightest shelters are constructed of stainless steel.

== Subways ==
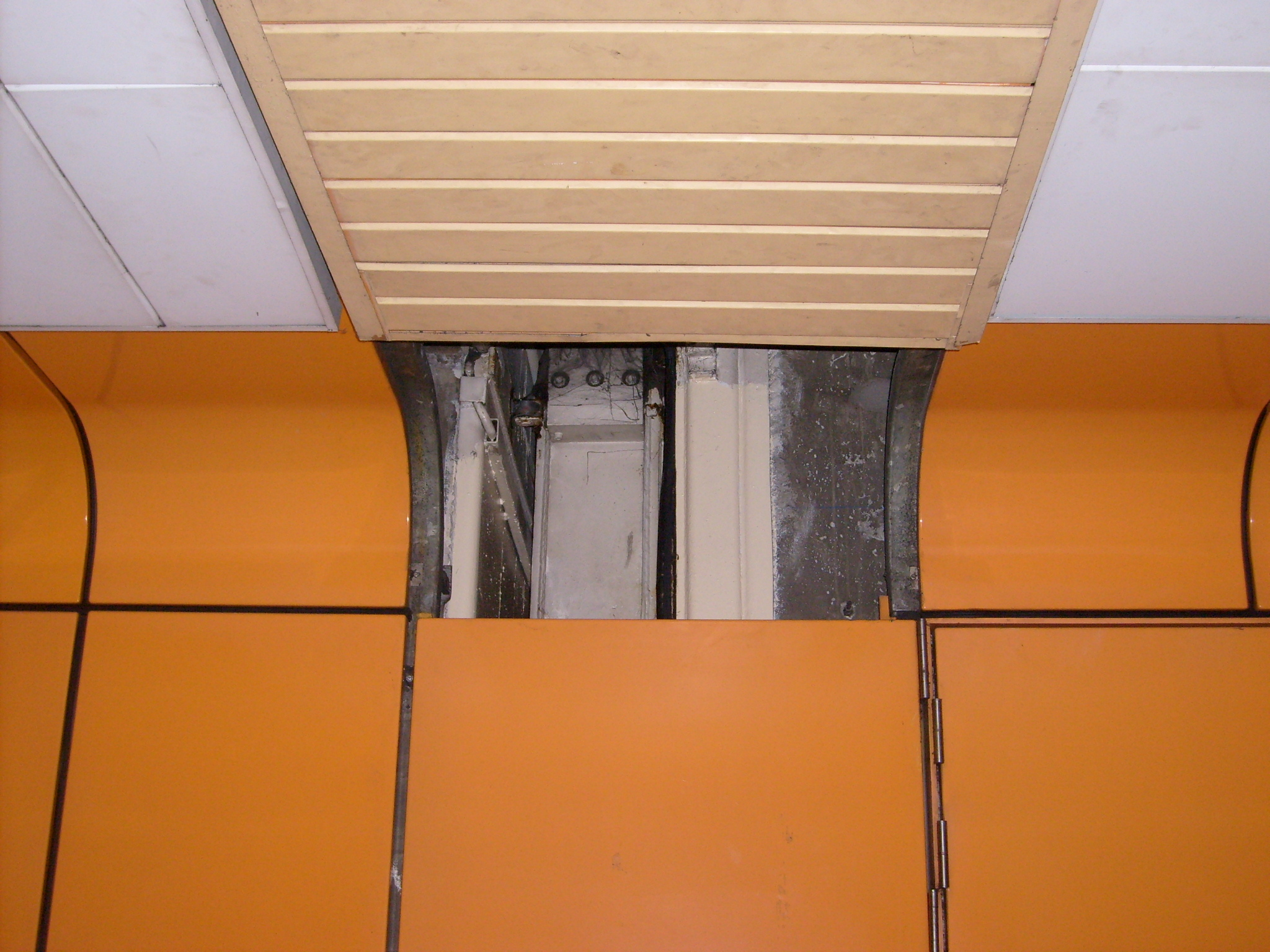
A blast door of a subway shelter in Singapore.

During World War II, people in London and Moscow survived German aerial bombing by taking refuge in the underground railway stations, e.g. the London Underground. In the second half of the 20th century, metro stations in eastern Europe and the USSR were constructed to serve as blast shelters.

Stations of the Pyongyang Metro in North Korea, constructed 110 metres (360 ft) below ground in the 1960s and 1970s, are designed as nuclear-blast shelters, with each station's entrance featuring thick steel blast doors.

== See also ==
- Air raid shelter
- Autonomous building
- Emergency preparedness
- Retreat (survivalism)
