= Kearny air pump =

Type of air pump used to ventilate emergency shelters

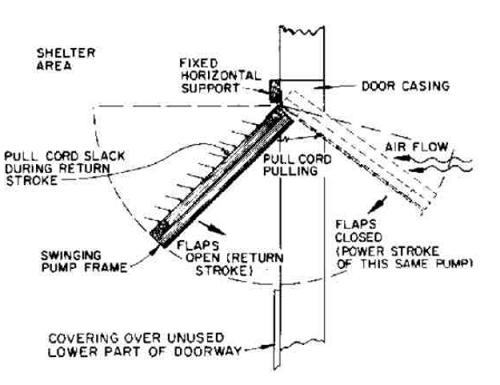
Kearny air pump in doorway (with flaps open during its return stroke)

The Kearny air pump is an expedient air pump used to ventilate a shelter. The design is such that a person with normal mechanical skills can construct and operate one. It is usually human-powered and designed to be employed during a time of crisis. It was designed to be used in a fallout shelter, but can be used in any situation where emergency ventilation is needed, as after a hurricane.

It was developed from research performed at Oak Ridge National Laboratory by Cresson Kearny and published in Nuclear War Survival Skills.

The basic principle is to create a flat surface with vanes that close when moving air and open when going back to the starting position. The design was derived from the punkah.

== See also ==
- Kearny fallout meter
- Nuclear War Survival Skills (ISBN 0-942487-01-X)
