= Survival Under Atomic Attack =

United States government booklet for use during nuclear war

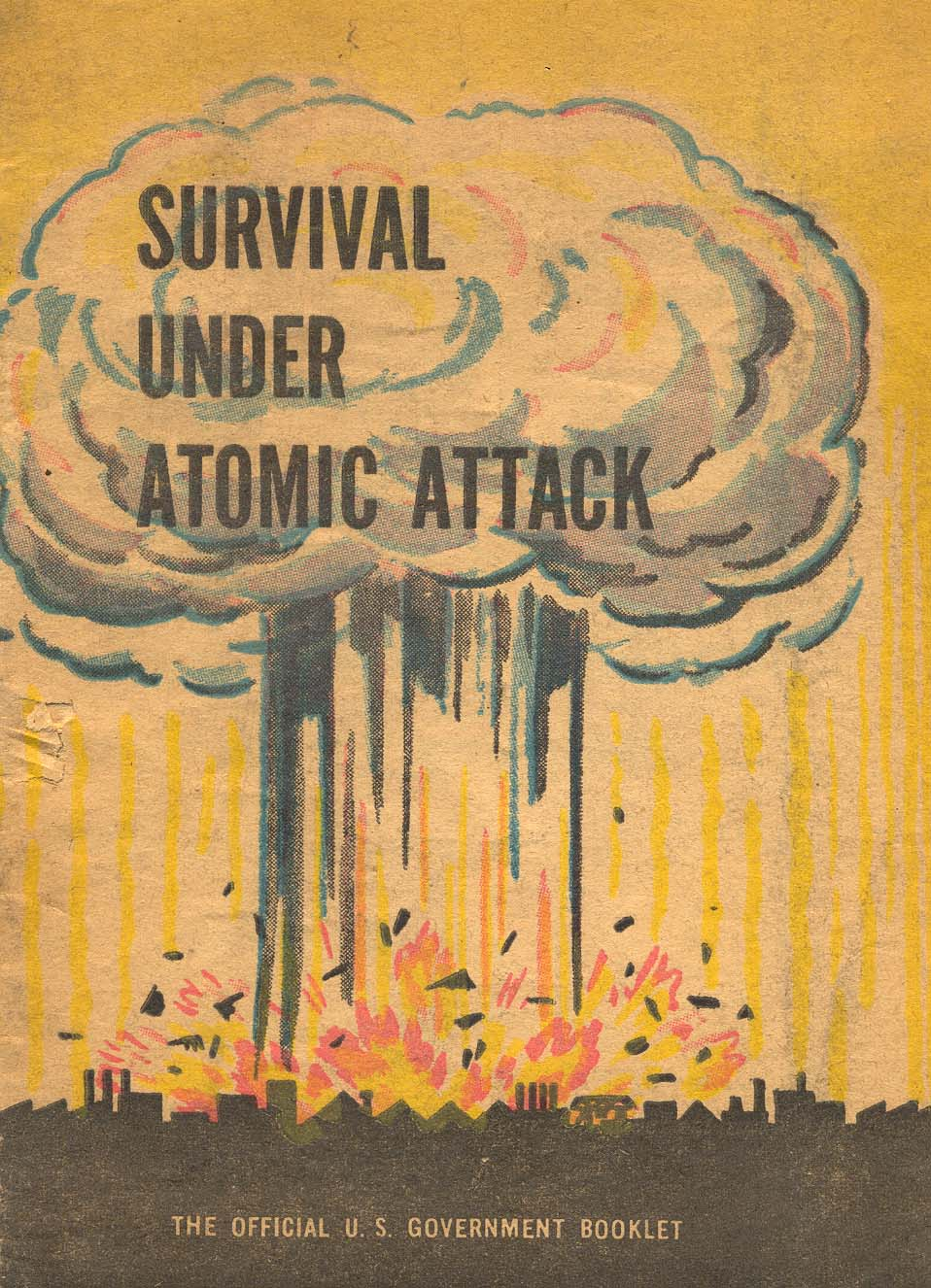
Copy of Survival Under Atomic Attack issued by the Cleveland office of Civil Defense.

Survival Under Atomic Attack was the title of an official United States government booklet released in 1951 by the Executive Office of the President, the National Security Resources Board (document 130), and the Civil Defense Office. Released at the onset of the Cold War era, the pamphlet was in line with rising fears that the Soviet Union would launch a nuclear attack against the United States, and outlined what to do in the event of an atomic attack.

The booklet introduced general public to the effects of nuclear weapons and was aimed at calming down the fears surrounding them. Survival Under Atomic Attack was the first entry in a series of government publications and communications that employed the strategy of "emotion management" in order to neutralize the horrifying aspects of nuclear weapons.

== Purpose ==
Published in 1950 by the Government Printing Office, one year after the Soviet Union detonated their first atomic bomb, the booklet explains how to protect oneself, one's food and water supply, and one's home. It also covered how to prevent burns and what to do if exposed to radiation. The U.S. Strategic bombing survey had assessed the civilian response in Hiroshima and Nagasaki beginning as early as August–September 1945 and its report was "Based on a detailed investigation of all the facts, and supported by the testimony of the surviving Japanese leaders involved...". Secondly, the Atomic Bomb Casualty Commission was active from 1946 to 1975 studying the effects of the two bombs on survivors in both cities and thus represented four years of post-bombing study at the time of publication.

== Center Insert ==
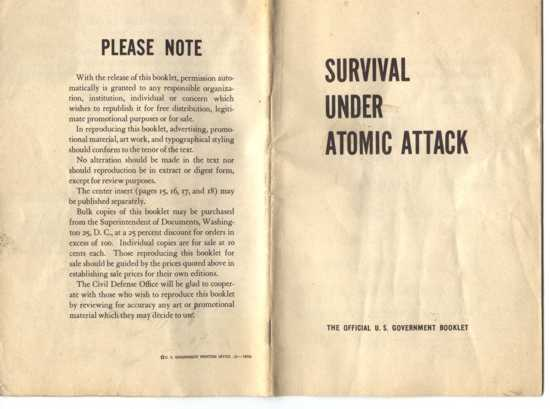
Original release of Survival Under Atomic Attack

The four pages in the center of the brochure (15, 16, 17, 18) were designed to be torn out. "Remove this sheet and keep it with you until you've memorized it."

=== Kill the Myths (15) ===
Atomic Weapons Will Not Destroy The Earth
Atomic bombs hold more death and destruction than man ever before has wrapped up in a single package, but their over-all power still has very definite limits. Not even hydrogen bombs will blow the earth apart or kill us all by radioactivity.
Doubling Bomb Power Does Not Double Destruction
Modern A-bombs can cause heavy damage 2 miles away, but doubling their power would extend that range only to 2.5 miles. To stretch the damage range from 2 to 4 miles would require a weapon more than 8 times the rated power of present models.
Radioactivity Is Not The Bomb's Greatest Threat
In most atom raids, blast and heat are by far the greatest dangers that people must face. Radioactivity alone would account for only a small percentage of all human deaths and injuries, except in underground or underwater explosions.
Radiation Sickness Is Not Always Fatal
In small amounts, radioactivity seldom is harmful. Even when serious radiation sickness follows a heavy dosage, there is still a good chance for recovery.

=== Six Survival Secrets For Atomic Attacks (16, 17) ===
==== Always Put First Things First And (16) ====
1. Try To Get Shielded
If you have time, get down in a basement or subway. Should you unexpectedly be caught out-of-doors, seek shelter alongside a building, or jump in any handy ditch or gutter.
2. Drop Flat On Ground Or Floor
To keep from being tossed about and to lessen the chances of being struck by falling and flying objects, flatten out at the base of a wall, or at the bottom of a bank.
3. Bury Your Face In Your Arms
When you drop flat, hide your eyes in the crook of your elbow. That will protect your face from flash burns, prevent temporary blindness and keep flying objects out of your eyes.

==== Never Lose Your Head And (17) ====
4. Don't Rush Outside Right After A Bombing
After an air burst, wait a few minutes then go help to fight fires. After other kinds of bursts wait at least 1 hour to give lingering radiation some chance to die down.
5. Don't Take Chances With Food Or Water In Open Containers
To prevent radioactive poisoning or disease, select your food and water with care. When there is reason to believe they may be contaminated, stick to canned and bottled things if possible.
6. Don't Start Rumors
In the confusion that follows a bombing, a single rumor might touch off a panic that could cost your life.

=== Five Keys To Household Safety (18) ===
1. Strive For "Fireproof Housekeeping"
Don't let trash pile up, and keep waste paper in covered containers. When an alert sounds, do all you can to eliminate sparks by shutting off the oil burner and covering all open flames.
2. Know Your Own Home
Know which is the safest part of your cellar, learn how to turn off your oil burner and what to do about utilities.
3. Have Emergency Equipment And Supplies Handy
Always have a good flashlight, a radio, first-aid equipment and a supply of canned goods in the house.
4. Close All Windows And Doors And Draw The Blinds
If you have time when an alert sounds, close the house up tight in order to keep out fire sparks and radioactive dusts and to lessen the chances of being cut by flying glass. Keep the house closed until all danger is past.
5. Use the Telephone Only For True Emergencies
Do not use the phone unless absolutely necessary. Leave the lines open for real emergency traffic.

== See also ==
- List of books about nuclear issues
- Continuity of government
- Duck and Cover (film)
- Fallout Protection
- Nuclear warfare
- Protect and Survive
- Survivalism
- United States Civil Defense
- Nuclear War Survival Skills
