= Kearny fallout meter =

Design of radiation meter

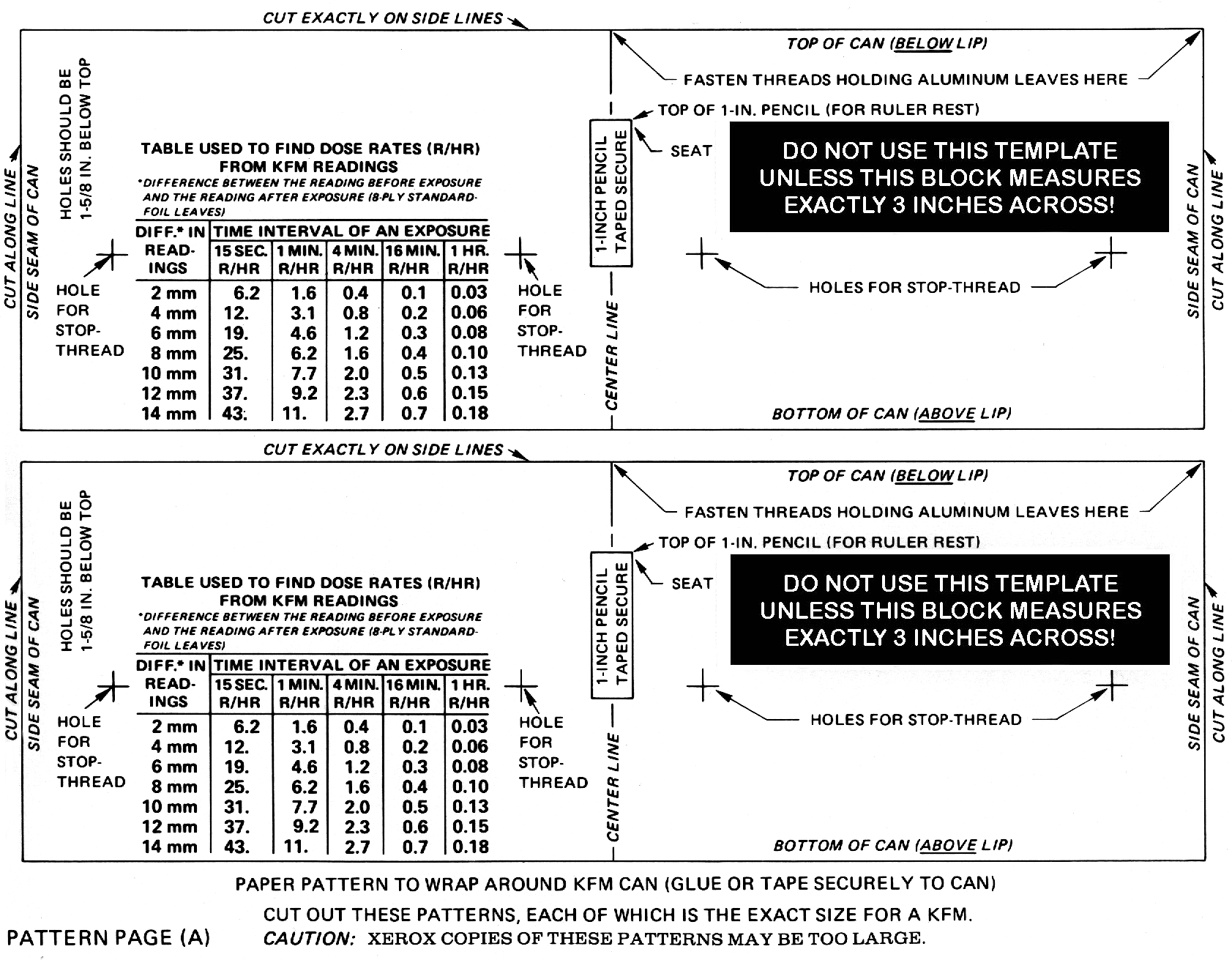
Dosage label

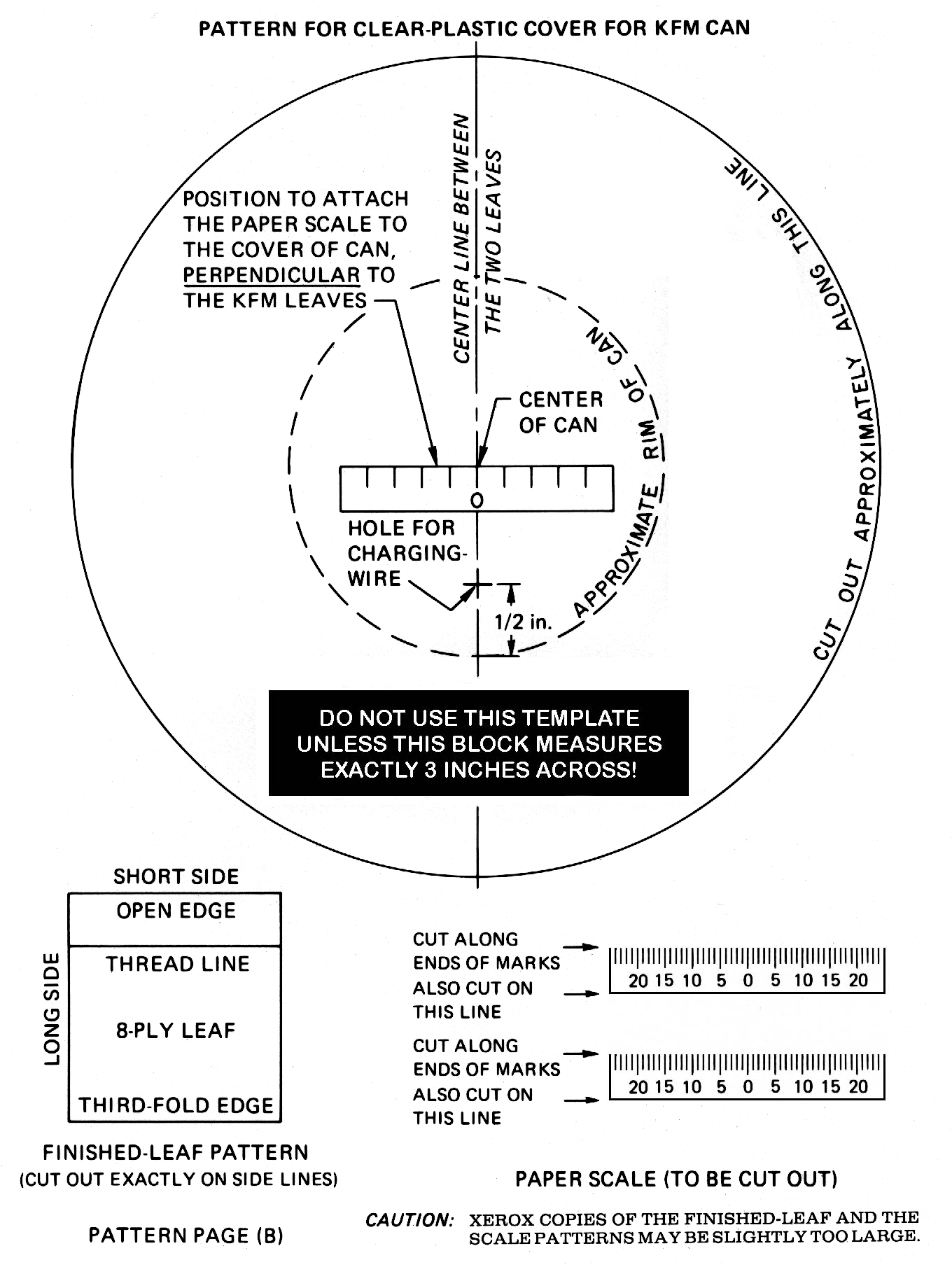
Template

The Kearny fallout meter, or KFM, is an expedient radiation meter. It is designed such that someone with a normal mechanical ability would be able to construct it before or during a nuclear attack, using common household items.

The Kearny fallout meter was developed by Cresson Kearny from research performed at Oak Ridge National Laboratory and published in the civil defense manual Nuclear War Survival Skills (ISBN 0-942487-01-X). The plans were originally released in Oak Ridge National Laboratory publication ORNL-5040, The KFM, A Homemade Yet Accurate and Dependable Fallout Meter and have been formatted in a newsprint-ready layout so that they may be quickly printed with accurate dimensions in local newspapers. It must be built from a correctly scaled copy of the plans; photocopies and printouts of digital copies may not be to scale.

== History ==
Devised in 1978 by Cresson Kearny, the Kearny fallout meter is an application of the gold-leaf electroscope developed in 1787 by Abraham Bennet. Prior to this, the use of the electrometer principle for radiation detection had seen widespread application in the form of the quartz fiber dosimeter. Professional radiation meters, while more accurate and more durable, had a number of potential issues, including cost and lack of availability, which it was hoped the Kearny fallout meter would address.

== Use ==
Commercially made radiation meters are typically based on electronic circuitry or require a battery-powered charging apparatus, allowing susceptibility to battery shortages and to electromagnetic pulse. The Kearny fallout meter was designed to utilize static electricity, produced by (for example) a hard plastic rubbed on dry paper. The KFM was also designed to be less expensive to build than the purchase price of dosimeters and to be made out of commonly available materials, such that they could be constructed even after a disaster. Most commercial radiation meters also require initial and periodic professional calibration, but "... if a KFM is made and maintained with the specified dimensions and of the specified materials, its accuracy is automatically and permanently established by unchanging laws of nature".

The designed operating range is from 30 mR/h to 43 R/h, with accuracy of ±25%. "A KFM looks like a toy" has been cited as a "major disadvantage" of the design. Yet another disadvantage is the method of operation, the meter does not provide the measurement on charging, but the charging cause two aluminium leaves to repel. The angle between the leaves is measured, and then the user measures the rate in which the leaves close.

== How it works ==
An electrostatic charge is placed upon two aluminium foil leaves, causing them to repel. As radiation strikes the meter, the foil leaves lose their charge and start to droop. This droop can be measured, and its rate can be established. The KFM has been used as a science project, demonstrating the effects of ionizing radiation.

The dimensions of a KFM and the weight of its leaves permanently establish its calibration, when built as specified with a properly sized scale.

== See also ==
- Geiger counter
- Kearny air pump
- Civil defense by country
