= Operator messaging =

Messaging answer service

Operator Messaging is the term, similar to Text Messaging and Voice Messaging, applying to an answering service call center who focuses on one specific scripting style that has grown out of the alphanumeric pager history.

== Early history ==
In the 1970s and early 1980s, the cost of making a phone call decreased and more business communication was done by phone. As corporations grew and labor rates increased, the ratio of secretaries to employees decreased. The initial solution to the phone communication problem for businesses was the “message center.” A message center or “message desk” was a centralized, manual answering service inside a company staffed by a few people, usually women, answering everyone's phones. Extensions that were busy or rang “no answer” would forward to the message center onto a device called a “call director”. The call director had a button for each extension in the company which would flash when that person's extension forwarded to the message center. A little label next to the button told the operator whose extension it was.

As wireless communication technologies increased in the late 1980s, the Pager service providers created a subscription service offered in a variety of plans and options to meet the needs of a subscriber and the type of device used. In general, all pagers are given unique telephone numbers so that callers could dial in and send a numeric message, such as their callback number or a numerically coded special message, such as room numbers to report to, etc. However, alphanumeric pagers could only receive text messages when the message sender had installed software on their PC to dial into the publicly accessible modems operated by the paging service provider to then transmit their message over-the-air through the network of radio towers.

== Message Center becomes Alpha-dispatch ==
Alpha Dispatch service is best described as enhanced numeric paging. It is a service that consists of live operators who answer incoming calls and input the callers' messages on a computer, then transmit the message using the Telocator Alphanumeric Protocol to the paging provider's radio towers. Alphanumeric pagers receive the messages in the form of words and numbers. Messages are sequentially numbered and archived for later reference if required to be re-sent. PageNet was one of the larger paging providers who offered this service add-on to their alphanumeric pager customers.

== Difference between full Answering Service ==
Alpha-dispatch was never designed to replace a full-service answering service. Although both services will answer calls in a customer's name and advise the caller that the customer is unavailable, a full-service answering service will usually have additional information about the customer that they are encouraged to share with the caller such as business summary, website information, personal schedule, and other informational details. An alpha-dispatch service operator usually has no knowledge of the subscriber, except for their first and last name or company name, and serves only as a messaging bridge between the caller and the subscriber with the caller dictating what the operator should type as a message to the subscriber. Because of this difference, minimal training and supervising is required of the call center employees and therefore operator messaging service is much less expensive than full-service answering services. The low cost makes operator messaging an affordable alternative to voicemail.

== Operator Messaging Extends to Text Messaging ==
As the use of alphanumeric pagers declined in the mid-1990s and cell phone text messaging availability and reliability increased ever since, these well-established alpha-dispatch call centers adjusted their technology to allow live operators' messages to be transmitted to cellular service providers in the same way as to pager service providers. Operators still follow the same answering procedures and have no idea if the subscriber is receiving the text message on a cell phone or a pager. The operator still serves as a "relay" or "bridge" for the caller to dictate their message to the operator messaging subscriber's device.

== Rise of Operator Messaging in the 21st Century ==
Although e-mail capabilities have been extended to alphanumeric pagers and cellular text messaging, the operator messaging services are used by individuals who are not located near a computer or where sending a text message may be dangerous or impractical. Live operator messaging marries the technologies of voice messaging and text messaging as an alternative to voicemail service by using call forwarding features to redirect callers of your cell phone automatically to the operator messaging service after three or four unanswered rings. Operator messaging service providers remain profitable because the average call length is under 30 seconds and employees are often paid less than full-service answering service employees due to the limited training required.

== See also ==
- Call center
- Pager
- Answering service
