= P2000 =

P2000 may stand for:

- P-2000 (album), a 2000 EP by black metal band Enthroned
- P2000 (network), a nationwide pager-network used by emergency services in the Netherlands
- Heckler & Koch P2000, a semi-automatic pistol manufactured by Heckler & Koch
- Philips P2000, a home computer that used to be made by Philips
- Archer-class patrol vessel, a class of Royal Navy patrol boat also known as the P2000 class
- Partnership 2000, a program connecting some 550 Jewish communities in the Diaspora with 45 Israel Partnership areas
- 2000 United States presidential election
- Preservation 2000, a land conservation program in Florida that preceded Florida Forever
- Siemens P2000, a light rail vehicle for the Los Angeles Metro Rail
