= Motorola PageWriter 2000 =

Two-way pager introduced in 1998

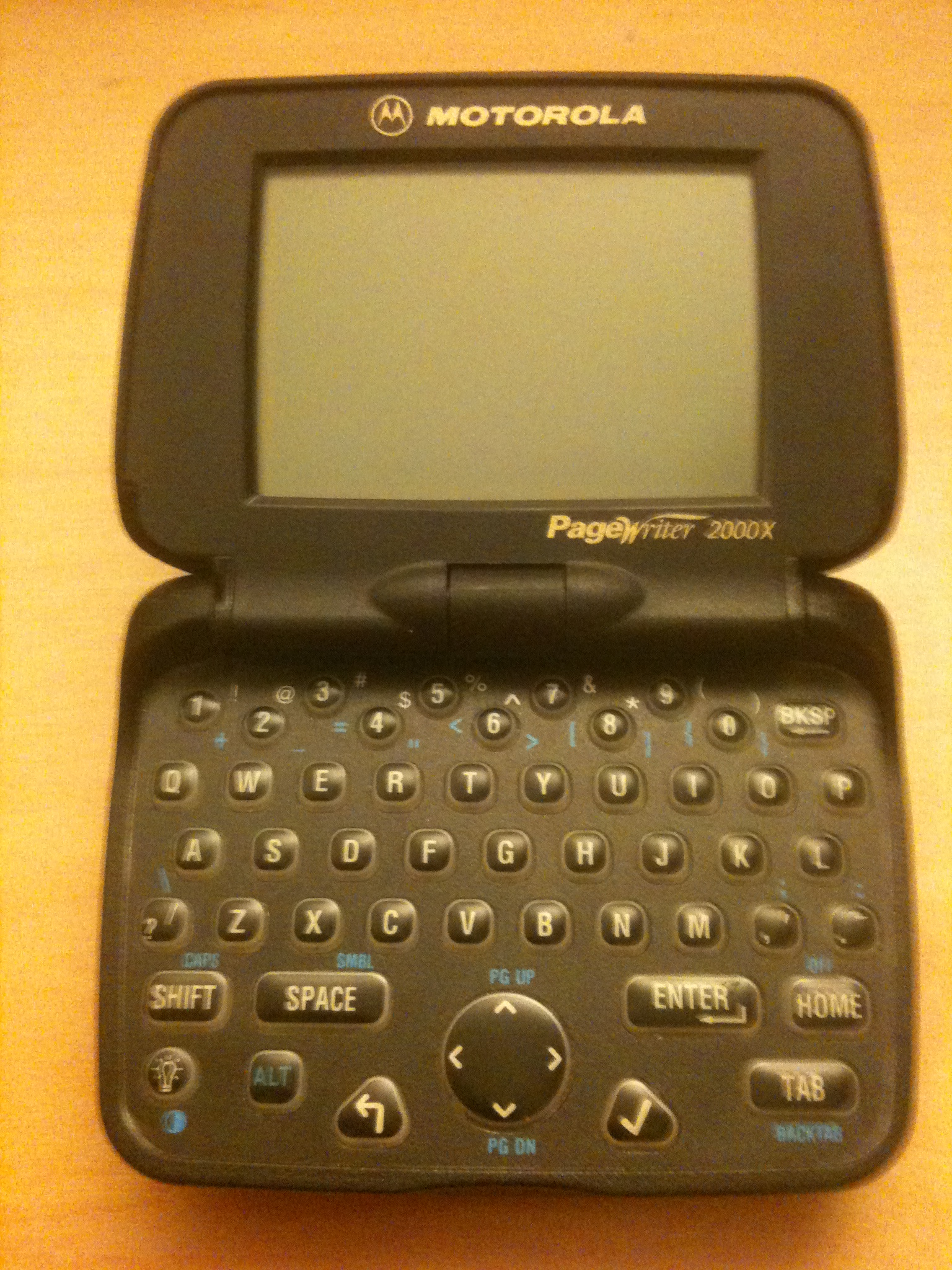
PageWriter 2000x

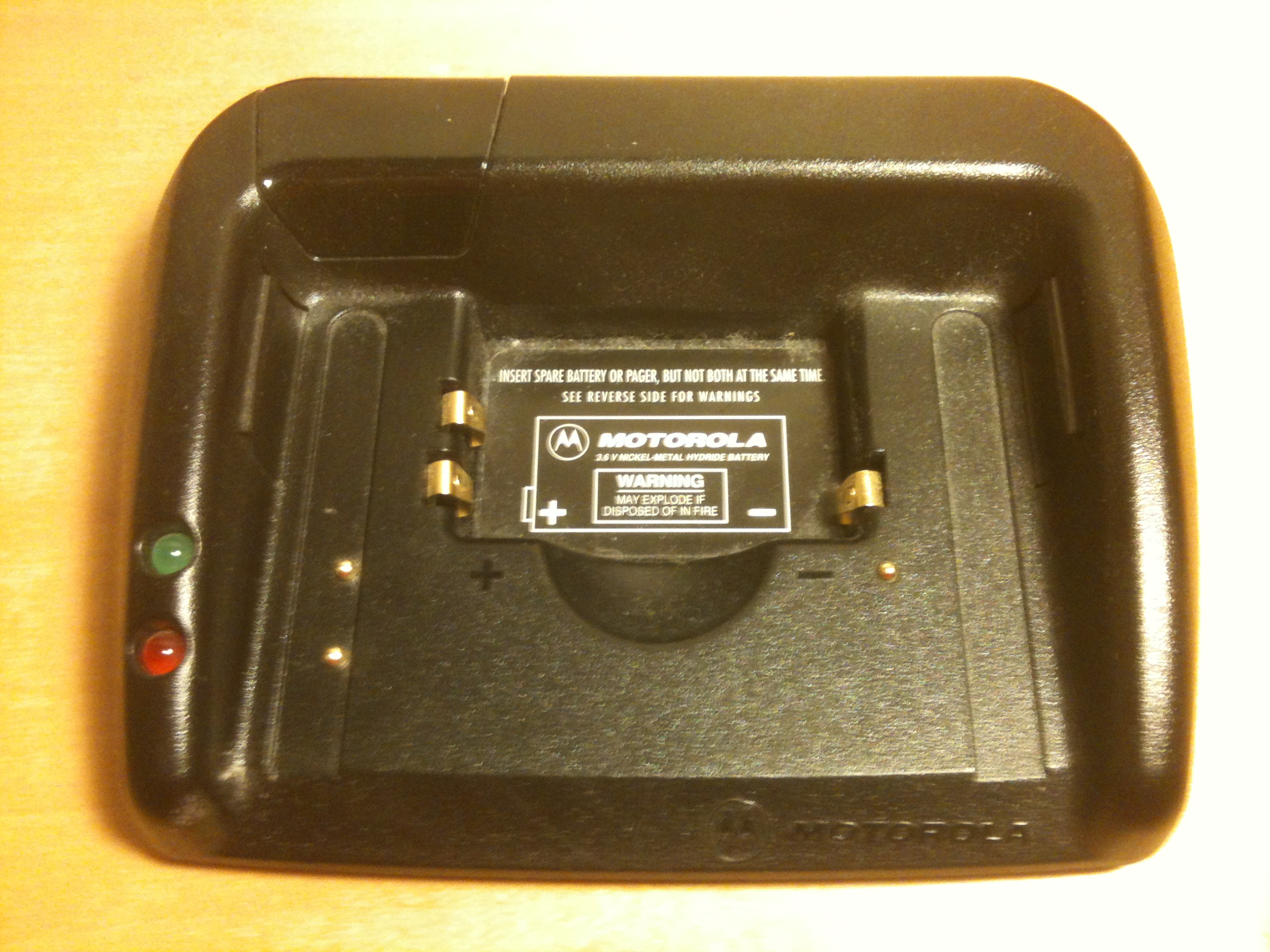
PageWriter charging base with Ir port

The Motorola PageWriter 2000 was a two-way pager introduced in 1997. Featuring the 68000 based Motorola DragonBall processor, 1 MB of internal storage, a four color grayscale screen, IrDA transmitter/receiver, and a full QWERTY keyboard the PageWriter represented a combination of both PDA and pager in one package. For wireless connectivity the PageWriter used SkyTel's ReFLEX paging network to send and receive messages to other pagers or to email addresses.

The device shipped with a number of applications including messaging, contacts, calendar, and notepad all written in its proprietary FLEXScript programming language. Additional applications could be purchased and downloaded to the PageWriter from a PC through its charging dock. That dock connected via RS-232 serial port to the PC and an IR port to the PageWriter.

== Email VClient ==
The most notable of the add-on applications for the PageWriter was the Motorola developed Email VClient. Debuted to the public at Lotusphere '98 in January of that year, this application allowed users for the first time to access their corporate email account remotely from their portable wireless device. Users could read, respond to, and create emails remotely while appearing to be interacting from their desktop. This application created the market for remote control of desktop email from a wireless device later popularized by the RIM BlackBerry.
