= SNPP =

SNPP may refer to:

== Real ==
- Shoreham Nuclear Power Plant
- Simple Network Paging Protocol
- Smolensk Nuclear Power Plant
- Suomi NPP, an American weather satellite in low Earth orbit.

== Fictional ==
- The Simpsons Archive, domain name snpp.com
- Springfield Nuclear Power Plant
