= DAPNET =

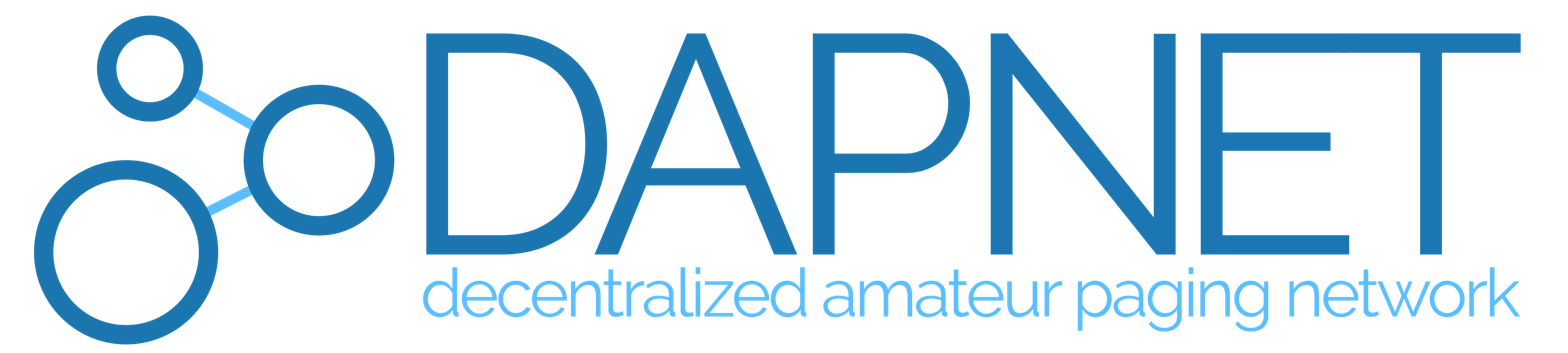
DAPNET logo

DAPNET (Decentralised Amateur Paging Network) is a free global paging network created and maintained by amateur radio enthusiasts. Messages can be received on commercially available pagers that support the POCSAG protocol and are tuned to the appropriate frequency.

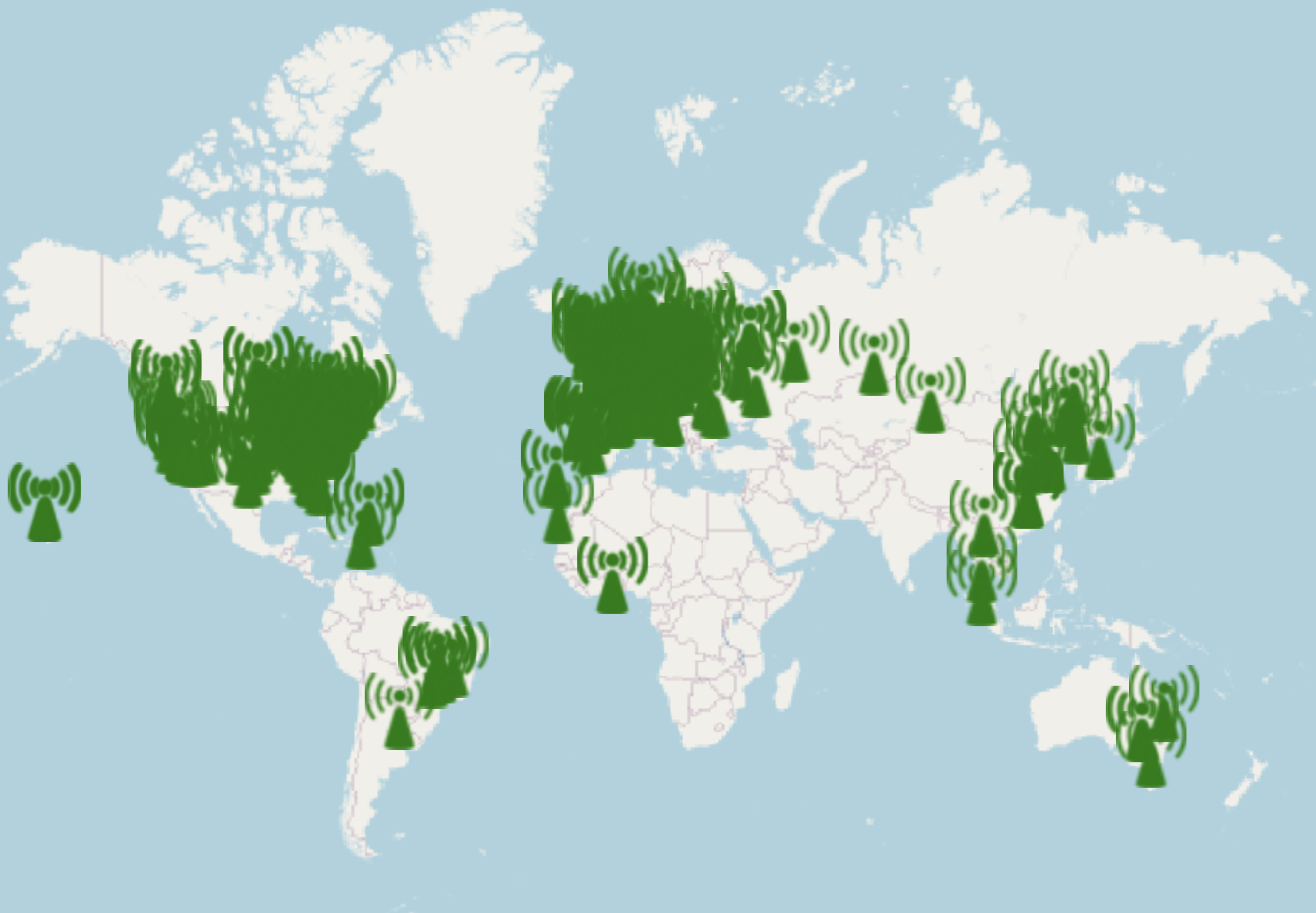
DAPNET as of July 2023

== History ==
A similar ham radio project called FunkrufMaster was quite popular around 2000. It was based on AX.25-technology and the former Packet Radio Network. Because of the upcoming HAMNET- and IP-Protocol era, a successor was needed. Members of the ham radio activity group at RWTH Aachen University designed and developed DAPNET from scratch as a modern software approach. As of March 2018, over 90 transmitters were already in permanent operation, and the coverage area included parts of Germany, the Netherlands, Belgium, and Switzerland, with Raspberry Pi-based personal hotspots extending coverage around the world.

== Technical specifications ==
The recommended frequency for DAPNET is 439.9875 MHz, which is part of the 70-centimeter band dedicated to amateur radio use. The transmitters are networked, some via HAMNET, some via the Internet. The standard paging protocol POCSAG is used for message transmission. For a low-power transmitter you can use Raspberry Pi with unipager and MMDVM-modem installed, and to make the coverage area several miles, a radio amplifier needs to be added to its output. The coverage area of the transmitter can be up to 20 km (12 miles), depending on the terrain and the height of the antenna.

== Receivers ==
Skyper and AlphaPOC pagers are particularly popular for receiving messages. They can be easily tuned to the desired reception frequency and also offer many other possibilities, such as receiving bulletins - messages sent to all recipients. However, other brands of pagers can be customized accordingly or Flipper Zero can be used.

Messages can be sent via a multilingual website as well as Android and iOS apps.
