= Telocator Alphanumeric Protocol =

1985 MetroMedia IXO Device

Telocator Alphanumeric Protocol (TAP) is an industry-standard protocol for sending short messages via a land-line modem to a provider of pager and/or SMS services, for onward transmission to pagers and mobile phones.

TAP, initially known as Motorola Page Entry (PET) was adopted in September 1988, by the Personal Communication Industry Association. TAP defines an industry standard for sending alphanumeric messages to pagers.

TAP was also known as IXO protocol. Originally, devices like the IXO Device were used to send Alphanumeric Pages using TAP. Later, Motorola would create a similar device called the AlphaMate.

== TAP Communication Protocol ==
The standard protocol is ASCII with XON/XOFF flow control, using a 10-bit code (1 start bit, 7 data bits, even parity, 1 stop bit). No echo shall be employed in full duplex mode.

== See also ==
- Simple Network Paging Protocol (SNPP)
- Wireless Communications Transfer Protocol (WCTP)
