= P2000 (network) =

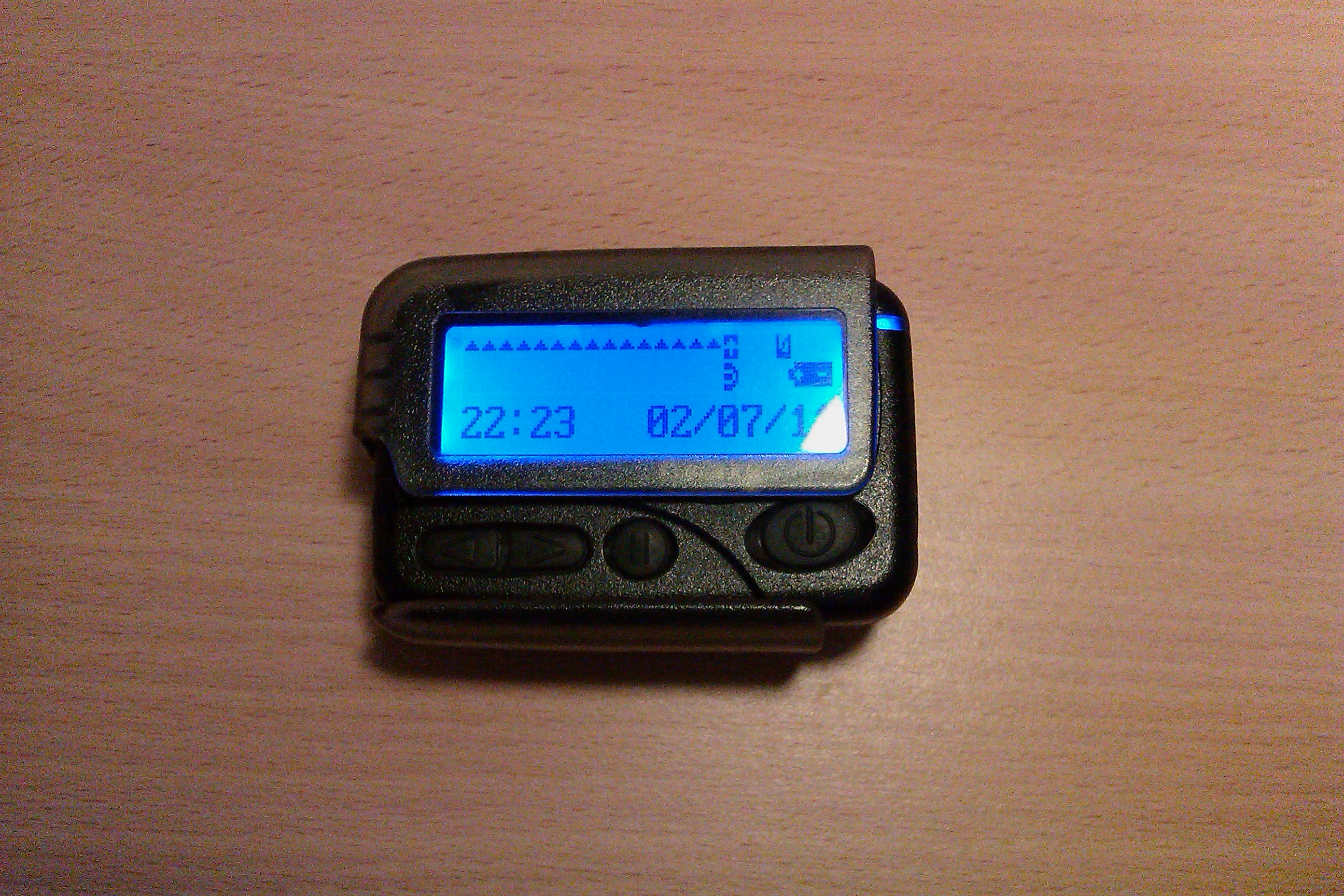
A P2000 pager

P2000 is a one-way communications network for pagers based on Motorola's FLEX-protocol in the Netherlands. The network is used by all emergency services and provides nationwide coverage. Several tests have shown the network can cope with the largest disasters when large numbers of emergency personnel need to be reached. The P2000 network is maintained by the Ministry of the Interior and Kingdom Relations.

Messages are similar to SMS-messages. The FLEX-protocol does not provide encryption, which means any message can be read by everyone with a receiver. Several websites provide a live monitor for all messages on this network.
