= POCSAG =

Communications protocol

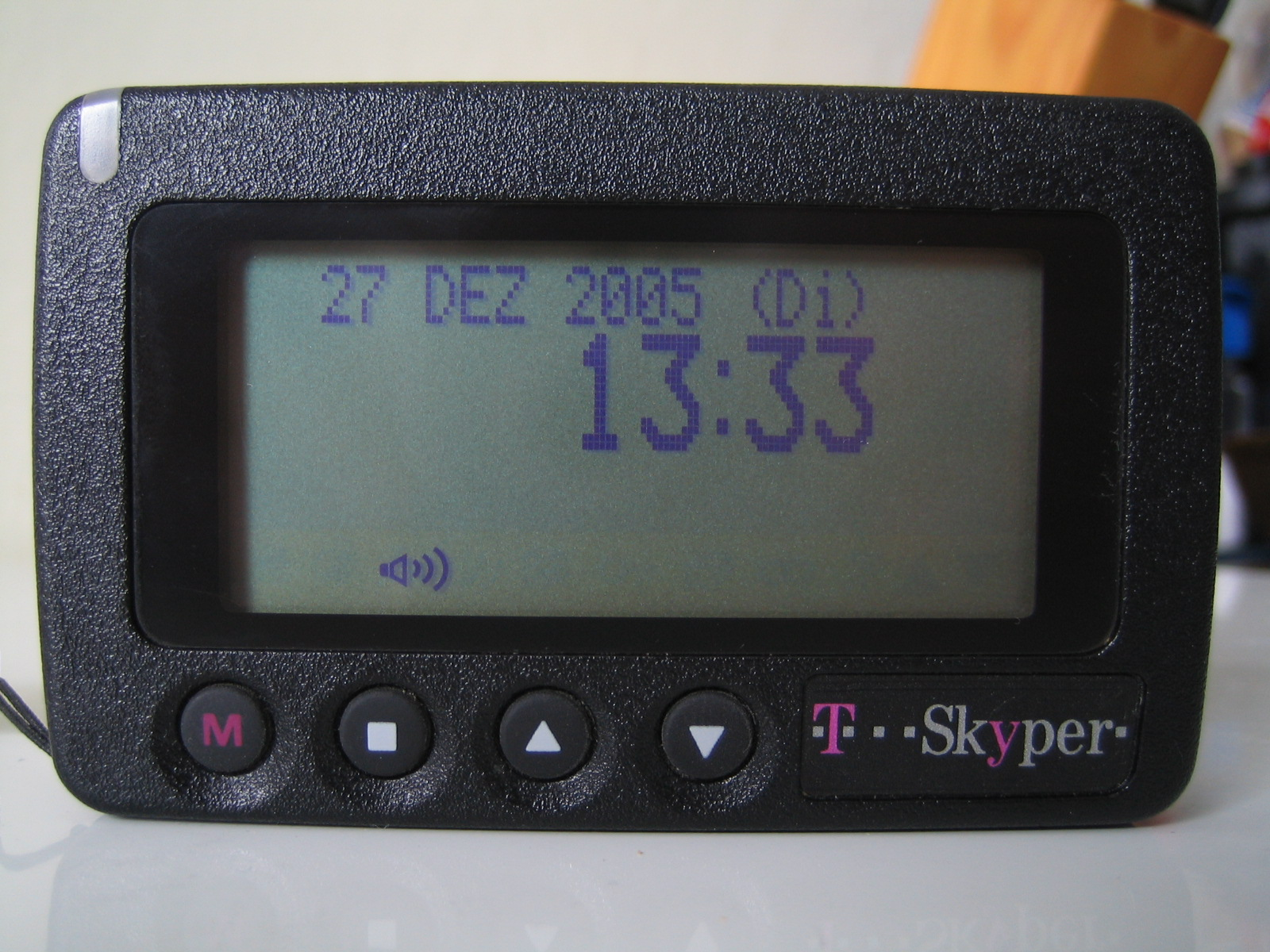
An NEC pager, using POCSAG coding branded for the Skyper network

Radio-paging code No. 1 (usually and hereafter called POCSAG) is an asynchronous protocol used to transmit data to pagers such as alphanumeric pagers and numeric pagers. Its usual designation is an acronym of the Post Office Code Standardisation Advisory Group, the name of the group that developed the code under the chairmanship of the British Post Office that used to operate most telecommunications in Britain before privatization.

Before the development and adoption of the POCSAG code, pagers used one of several codes such as binary Golay code.

In the 1990s new paging codes were developed that offered higher data transmission rates and other advanced features such as European and network roaming.

The POCSAG code originally transmitted at 512 bits per second. Faster transmission at 1200 or 2400 bits per second using so-called Super-POCSAG has largely displaced the slower, original POCSAG in the developed world, although the faster "Super-POCSAG" has not yet entirely replaced standard POCSAG as of 2011.

== History ==
In 1976 an international group of engineers began to meet to explore the possibility of developing a new code for wide area paging; paging networks covering regions of entire countries. These meetings were successful and in February 1981 the CCIR (Comité consultatif international pour la radio) the forerunner of the ITU-R accepted the code as Radiopaging Code No.1 (RPC No.1),(Rec, 584). The meetings were chaired by R.H.Tridgell and were attended by representatives of British, European, and Japanese pager manufacturers

== How it works ==
The modulation used is frequency-shift keying (FSK) with a ±4.5 kHz shift on the carrier. The high frequency represents a 0 and the low frequency a 1.

The ±4.5 kHz frequency shift is used along with a 25 kHz channel spacing, known as "wideband". Some jurisdictions require that all systems move to a "narrowband" configuration, using 12.5 kHz channels and ±2.5 kHz frequency shifts (for example, the U.S. Federal Communications Commission (FCC) has mandated this transition be completed prior to 2013.).

Often single transmission channels contain blocks of data at more than one of the rates.

Transmission uses 32-bit blocks called codewords. Each codeword carries 21 bits of information (bits 31 through 11), 10 bits of error-correcting code (bits 10 through 1), and an even parity bit (bit 0). Bits 31 through 1 are a binary BCH code (31, 21). The error-correcting code has a 6-bit Hamming distance: each 31-bit codeword differs from every other codeword in at least 6 bits. Consequently, the code can detect and correct up to 2 errors in a codeword.

The generating polynomial g(x) for the BCH (31, 21) code is:

$$\begin{align}
g(x)&=x^{10}+x^9+x^8+x^6+x^5+x^3+1\\
&=(x^5 + x^2 + 1)(x^5 + x^4 + x^3 + x^2 + 1)
\end{align}$$

The codewords are either address or data, which is indicated by the first bit transmitted, bit 31. An address codeword contains 18 bits of address (bit 30 through to 13), and 2 function bits (12 & 11). Each data codeword carries 20 bits of data (bits 30 through to 11).

Codewords are transmitted in batches that consist of a sync codeword, defined in the standard as 0x7CD215D8, followed by 16 payload codewords that are either address or data. Any unused codewords are filled with the idle value of 0x7A89C197.

Although the address (also referred to as a RIC - Radio Identity Code or CAP code - Channel Access Protocol code) is transmitted as 18 bits the actual address is 21-bits long: the remaining three bits are derived from which of the 8 pairs of codewords in the batch the address is sent in. This strategy allows the receiver to turn off for a considerable percentage of the time as it only needs to listen to the pair that applies to it, thus saving a significant amount of battery power.

Before a burst of data there will always be a preamble of at least 576 bits of data containing alternating 1s and 0s, allowing the receiver to synchronize itself to the signal, and is another mechanism that enables the receiver to be turned off for a large percentage of the time.

A message will start with an address codeword followed by a number of data codewords and will continue until another address, a sync, or an idle codeword is sent. When the data bits are extracted they will be in one of two formats.

== Message format ==
There are two message coding formats for the data messages. Numeric messages are sent as 4 bit BCD values, and alphanumeric messages are sent as 7-bit ASCII. The 7-bit ASCII is commonly referred to as 'alpha-paging', and 4-bit BCD is commonly referred to as 'numeric-paging'.

=== Numeric paging ===
BCD encoding packs 4 bit BCD symbols 5 to a codeword into bits 30–11.

The most significant nibble (bits 30,29,28,27) is the leftmost (or most significant) of a BCD coded numeric datum.

Values beyond 9 in each nibble (i.e. 0xA through 0xF) are encoded as follows:

- 0xA Reserved (possibly used for address extension)
- 0xB Character U (urgency)
- 0xC " ", Space (blank)
- 0xD "-", Hyphen (or dash)
- 0xE ")", Right bracket
- 0xF "(", Left bracket

BCD messages are space padded with trailing 0xC's to fill the codeword. There is no POCSAG specified restriction on message length, but particular pagers of course have a fixed number of characters in their display.

=== Text paging ===
Alphanumeric messages are encoded in 7-bit ASCII characters packed into the 20 bit data area of a message codeword (bits 30–11). Since three seven bit characters are 21 rather than 20 bits and the designers of the standard did not want to waste transmission time, they chose to pack the first 20 bits of an ASCII message into the first code word, the next 20 bits of a message into the next codeword and so forth.

What this means that a 7-bit ASCII character of a message that falls on a boundary can and will be split between two code words, and that the alignment of character boundaries in a particular alpha message code word depends on which code word it is of a message. The side benefit of this is a slightly increased error-correcting code reliability for messages that span more than one POCSAG packet.

Within a codeword 7-bit characters are packed from left to right (MSB to LSB). The LSB of an ASCII character is sent first (is the MSB in the codeword) as per standard ASCII transmission conventions, so viewed as bits inside a codeword the characters are bit reversed.

== National implementations ==
POCSAG 512
Example of POCSAG transmission in 512 bits per second.

POCSAG 1200
Example of POCSAG transmission in 1200 bits per second.

POCSAG 2400
Example of POCSAG transmission in 2400 bits per second.

=== Europe ===
In the UK, most pager transmissions are in five bands at

- 26 MHz (local pagers, mainly hospital systems, POCSAG and voice)
- 49 MHz
- 138 MHz
- 153 to 153.5 MHz
- 439.9875 MHz (used by DAPNET - amateur radio)
- 454 MHz

The frequency 466.075 MHz was previously used by Hutchison Paging, but the network was shut down in 2000. The frequency is still reserved for paging but is not used.

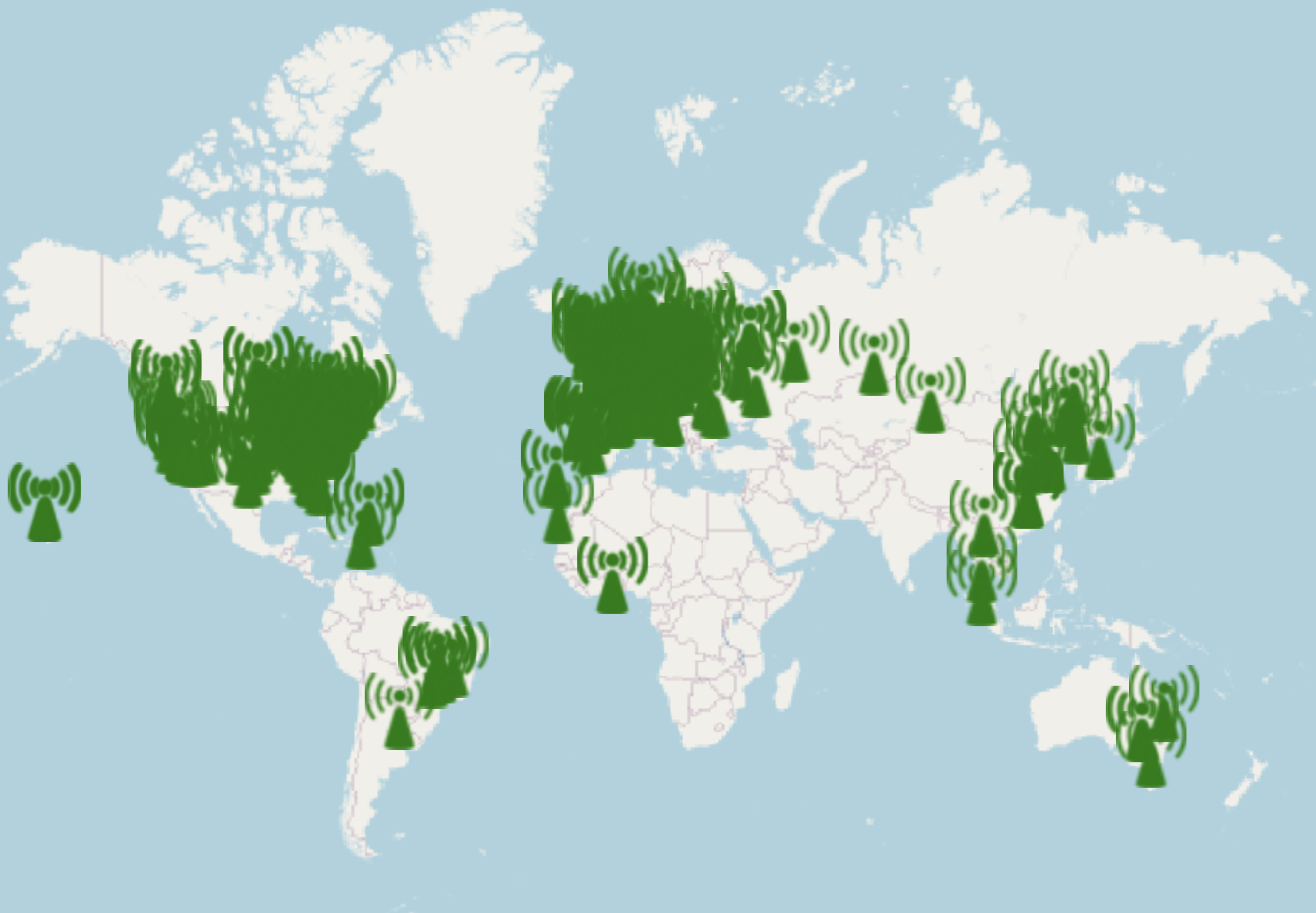
DAPNET: Decentralized amateur paging network worldwide

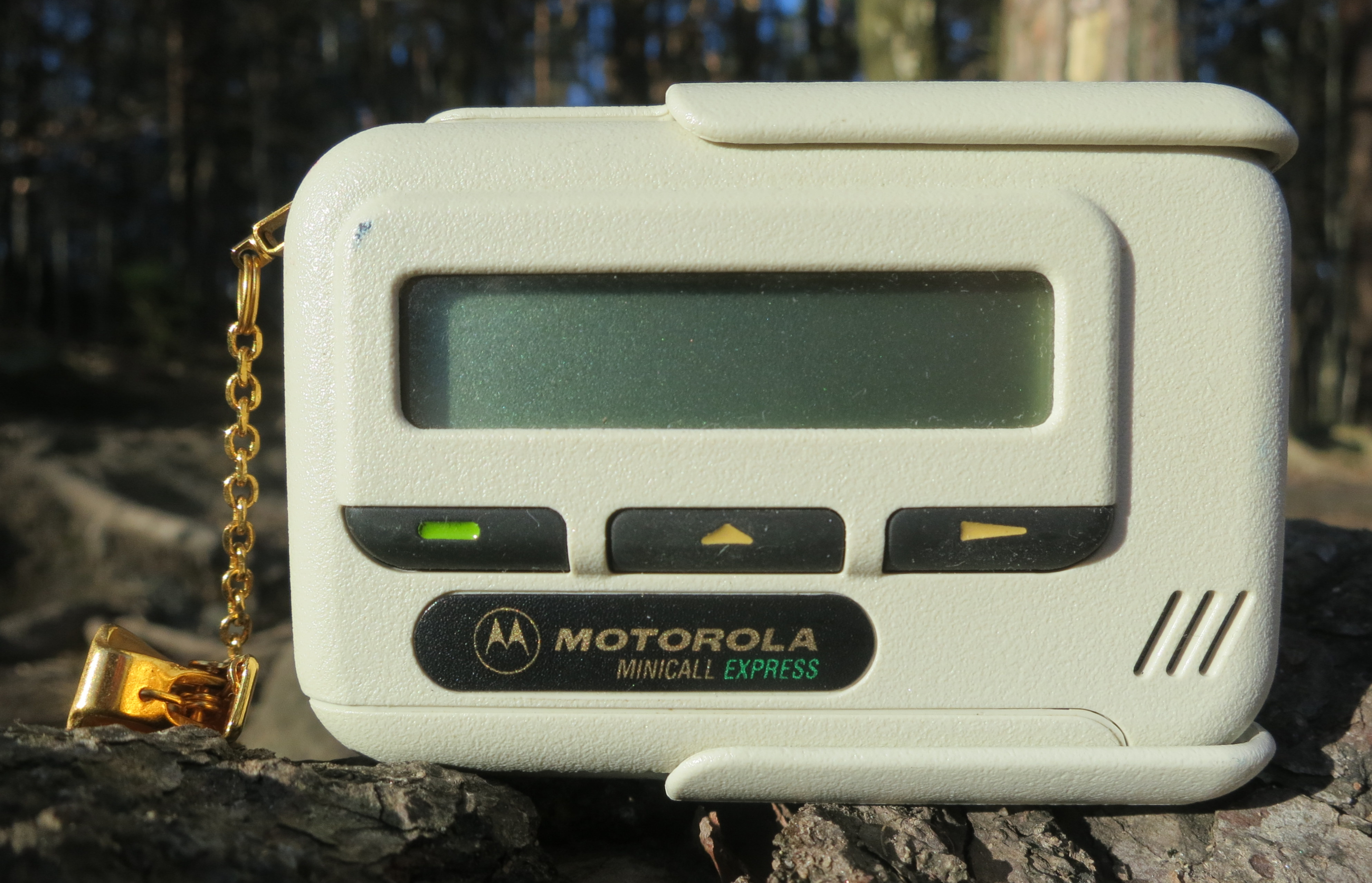
Swedish 1990s Minicall pager.

In Germany, well known transmissions are at

- 173 MHz range (Fire Departments, Rescue)
- 439.9875 MHz (Amateur-Radio pager-network)
- 144.8625 MHz (Amateur-Radio pager-network VHF in the German-Luxembourgish Border Region)
- 466.075 MHz (nationwide public paging by emessage)
- 465.970 MHz (-same-, old frequency of the POCSAG-Service Skyper)
- 448.425 MHz (nationwide Fire Departments, Rescue by emassage (named e*Bos), old frequency of the POCSAG-Service Telmi)

Licensed paging is possible in any other VHF/UHF bands.

In Spain, nationwide service was provided by Telefónica Mensatel but the network was shut down in 2012.

The Swedish pager network marketed as "Minicall" is encoded as POCSAG and broadcast on these frequencies:

- 169.800 MHz
- 161.4375 MHz

In Switzerland the following frequencies are used:

- Telepage F1: 147,400 MHz (512 bit/s)
- Telepage F2: 147,375 MHz (1200 bit/s)
- Telepage F3: 147,325 MHz (1200 bit/s)
- Telepage F4: 147,300 MHz (1200 bit/s)
- SIKAN: 169,500 MHz

The Belgium POCSAG is used for paging over the A.S.T.R.I.D. network:

- 169.625 MHz: POCSAG 2400 (Fire Departments, Rescue)

In Italy, the 26.225-26.935 MHz band (AM/FM, odd frequency steps) and 40.0125-40.0875 MHz (in 25 kHz steps) may be used for local pagers. These frequencies are often used for on-site hospital paging systems, including voice paging. Use of POCSAG on the 26 MHz and 27 MHz band has been logged by several listeners in Europe, specifically frequencies 26.350 MHz, 26.500 MHz, 26.705 MHz, 26.725 MHz, 26.755 MHz, 27.005 MHz, 27.007 MHz, 27.255 MHz (see note below regarding legal use of 27.255 MHz for paging in the United States). It appears that US-specification paging systems operating on 27.255 MHz have been sold in Italy and other European countries.

The former monopoly operator SIP (which later became TIM) used the following frequencies for their pager service, called Teledrin:

- 161.175 MHz (for tone/voice only and numeric pagers, probably for the alphanumeric pagers);
- 466.075 MHz (for tone/voice only, numeric and alphanumeric pagers, using the narrow frequencies of the TACS phone system)

In France, POCSAG is operated by E*Message over the AlphaPage network on the 466 MHz frequency:

- 466.025 MHz
- 466.050 MHz
- 466.075 MHz
- 466.175 MHz
- 466.20625 MHz
- 466.23125 MHz

=== Americas ===
==== United States ====
- POCSAG can be used on any of the frequencies reserved for paging. In some areas, these frequencies may be used for other purposes, including land-mobile voice and data communications (generally under a waiver from the FCC). The 35, 43, 152, 157 and 454 MHz bands were originally allocated to the Improved Mobile Telephone Service radiotelephone "car phone" services in the United States. With the demise of the IMTS service, these frequency bands were re-allocated to other services, including paging. The 26.995 MHz, 27.045 MHz, 27.095 MHz, 27.145 MHz, 27.195 MHz and 27.255 MHz frequencies do not require a license. 27.255 MHz is authorized for higher power use (25 watt power limit compared to 4 watt power limit for the other 26-28 MHz frequencies) but is shared with CB radio channel 23 and is not protected from interference from CB radio transmissions. Reference Part 95 of the FCC Rules, Subpart C sections 95.731, 95.763, 95.767, 95.771 and 95.773, ref: 47 CFR 95.701 through 47 CFR 95.899) The license-free MURS radio service (see Part 95 of FCC Rules, Subpart J sections 95.2701 through 95.3099 ref: 47 CFR 95.2701 through 47 CFR 95.3099.
- 26.9950, 27.0450, 27.0950, 27.1450, 27.1950 - Authorized in Part 95 of FCC rules. 4 watt power limit. Shared with Radio Control Radio Service, data link and telemetry systems.
- 27.2550 - Authorized in Part 95 of FCC rules. 25 watt power limit. Shared with Citizen's Band Radio service, Radio Control Radio Service, and telemetry.
- 35.2200 to 35.6600 (40 kHz steps)
- 43.2200 to 43.6600 (40 kHz steps)
- 151.8200, 151.8800, 151.9400, 154.5700, 154.6000 - Authorized in Part 95 of FCC rules. 2 watt power limit. Shared with other unlicensed MURS voice and data users.
- 152.0075 Medical Paging
- 152.0300 to 152.8100 (30 kHz steps) - shared with land mobile in some cities
- 157.4500 Medical Paging
- 157.7700 to 158.7000 (30 kHz steps) - shared with land mobile in some cities
- 163.2500 Medical Paging
- 439.9875 Amateur Radio (Ham) paging service (see DAPNET)
- 454.0125 to 454.5000 (12.5 kHz steps) - shared with land mobile in some cities
- 462.7500 to 462.9250 (25 kHz steps) - shared with low power land mobile services
- 465.0000
- 467.7500 to 467.9250 (25 kHz steps) - local paging - shared with low power land mobile services
- 929.0125 to 929.9875 (12.5 kHz steps)
- 931.0125 to 931.9875 (12.5 kHz steps)

In addition to the bands listed above, paging may be authorized on any frequency in the land mobile bands authorized under Part 90 of the FCC rules, including frequencies in the 72-76 MHz band as well as the usual 30.56-49.58 MHz, 150.775-162.000 MHz VHF bands and the 450-470 MHz band (plus 421-430 or 470-512 MHz in certain cities). In larger metropolitan areas with congested frequency spectrum, paging services will often share the same frequency as land mobile stations, or operate on an adjacent channel. For example, a department store may operate handheld walkie-talkies on 462.7625 MHz while there are high power pager transmitters on 462.7500 MHz and/or 462.7750 MHz in the same city. Or, a restaurant will use 467.7500 MHz to alert customers when their table is ready (using so-called "coaster pagers") while a department store nearby uses 467.7500 MHz for their in-store communications. In both of these examples, the department store is forced to use a squelch system such as CTCSS or DCS.

In many areas in the United States, these frequencies are used for land mobile (two-way) radio communications services in addition to paging. The VHF (152/157-158 MHz) and UHF (454/459 MHz) frequencies are often used for a mixture of paging and land mobile communications. The VHF low band (35/43 MHz) frequencies are mainly used for local hospital paging and in many areas are completely unused.

==== Mexico ====
- 931.4375 MHz; (UHF) (Skytel)
- 931.9375 MHz; (UHF) (Skytel)

=== Colombia ===
- 929.9375 MHz
- 138 to 174 MHz
- 406 to 512 MHz
- 929 to 932 MHz

=== Asia-Pacific ===
Australia uses the following frequencies for localised paging, such as in hospitals, hotels and other facilities, and also as an Emergency communication system for fire services (such as the Victorian Country Fire Authority) and for ambulances.

- 148.3375 MHz (VHF)
- 450.375 MHz (UHF)
- 450.325 MHz (UHF)
- 148.6625 MHz (VHF) Hospital paging network in South Australia

Other paging systems for wide-area paging, such as commercial networks are licensed and operate anywhere in the VHF/UHF bands.
