= Overton, Nebraska =

- Village
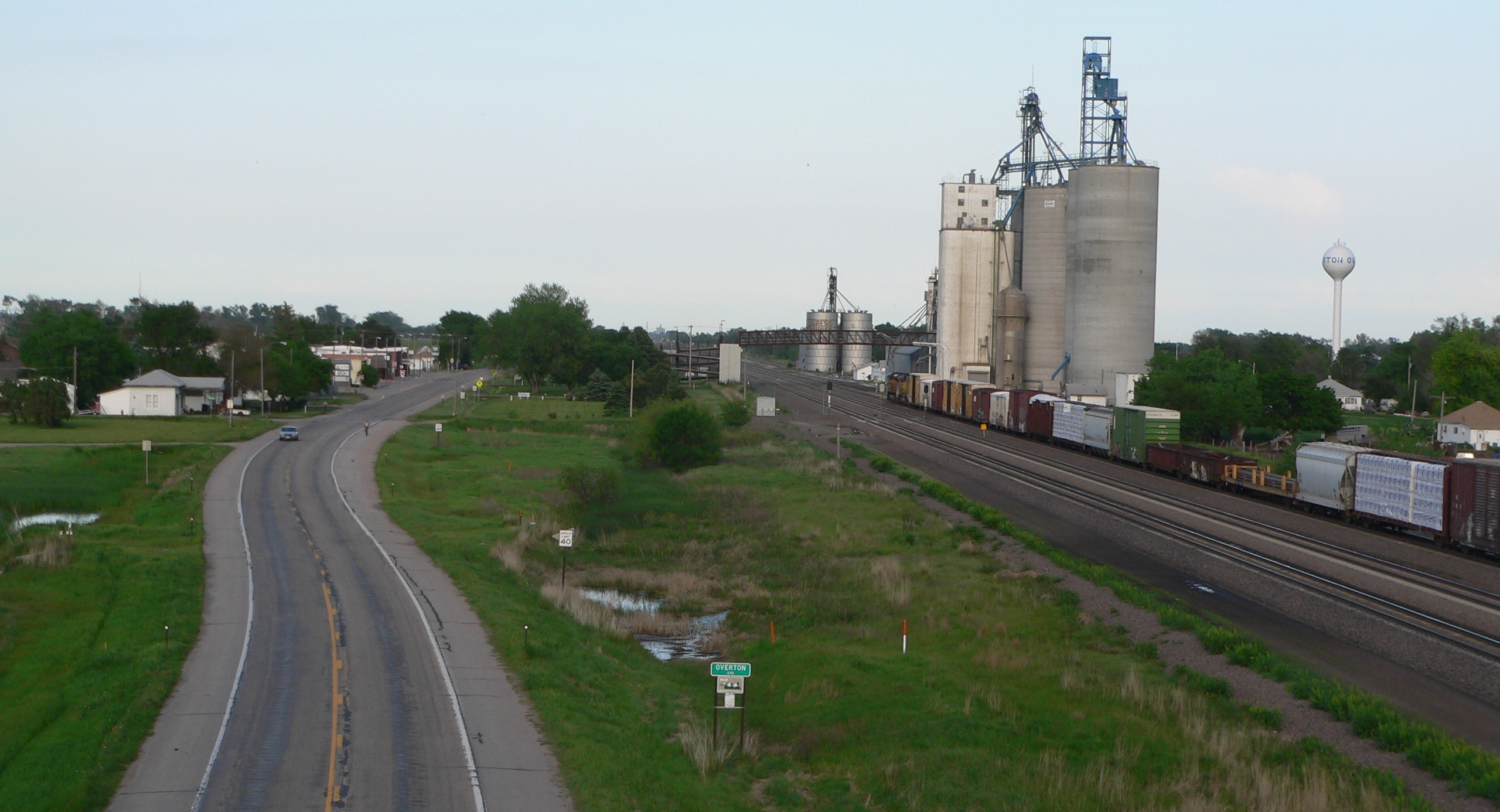
- Overton, seen looking eastward from County Road 444 overpass

- Location of Overton, Nebraska
- Coordinates: 40°44′26″N 99°32′15″W
- Country: United States
- State: Nebraska
- County: Dawson

Area
  - Total: 0.54 sq mi (1.40 km^{2})
  - Land: 0.54 sq mi (1.40 km^{2})
  - Water: 0 sq mi (0.00 km^{2})
- Elevation: 2,323 ft (708 m)

Population (2020)
  - Total: 607
  - Density: 1,123.4/sq mi (433.76/km^{2})
- Time zone: UTC-6 (Central (CST))
  - Summer (DST): UTC-5 (CDT)
- ZIP codes: 68834, 68863
- Area code: 308
- FIPS code: 31-37770
- GNIS feature ID: 2399600

Overton is a village in Dawson County, Nebraska, United States. It is part of the Lexington, Nebraska Micropolitan Statistical Area. As of the 2020 census, Overton had a population of 607.

== History ==
Overton got its start following construction of the Union Pacific Railroad through the territory. The town was first settled in 1873.

A group of African Canadian families from Elgin, Ontario began moving near Overton in 1879. Over the course of five years, members of the Robinson, Guilds, Green, Emanuel, Riley, Hatter, Meehan, Small, and Walker families relocated to Nebraska, filing homestead petitions and starting farms. Many of these families left Dawson County by 1907 to move to DeWitty in Cherry County.

The Plectron company, which manufactured alert radio receivers used by fire departments, was started in Overton in 1955; it transferred operations to Lexington in the 1980s

== Geography ==
According to the United States Census Bureau, the village has a total area of 0.54 square miles (1.40 km^{2}), all land.

== Demographics ==
Historical population
Census	Pop.	Note	%±
1900	255		—
1910	574		125.1%
1920	515		−10.3%
1930	600		16.5%
1940	491		−18.2%
1950	497		1.2%
1960	523		5.2%
1970	538		2.9%
1980	633		17.7%
1990	547		−13.6%
2000	646		18.1%
2010	594		−8.0%
2020	607		2.2%
U.S. Decennial Census

=== 2010 census ===
As of the census of 2010, there were 594 people, 227 households, and 163 families residing in the village. The population density was 1,100.0 inhabitants per square mile (424.7/km^{2}). There were 274 housing units at an average density of 507.4 per square mile (195.9/km^{2}). The racial makeup of the village was 95.1% White, 0.7% Native American, 0.2% Asian, 3.0% from other races, and 1.0% from two or more races. Hispanic or Latino of any race were 10.4% of the population.

There were 227 households, of which 37.0% had children under the age of 18 living with them, 52.9% were married couples living together, 11.5% had a female householder with no husband present, 7.5% had a male householder with no wife present, and 28.2% were non-families. 24.7% of all households were made up of individuals, and 8.8% had someone living alone who was 65 years of age or older. The average household size was 2.62 and the average family size was 3.14.

The median age in the village was 35.4 years. 30% of residents were under the age of 18; 6.5% were between the ages of 18 and 24; 26.5% were from 25 to 44; 25.2% were from 45 to 64; and 12% were 65 years of age or older. The gender makeup of the village was 54.5% male and 45.5% female.

=== 2000 census ===
As of the census of 2000, there were 646 people, 254 households, and 175 families residing in the village. The population density was 1,186.8 inhabitants per square mile (458.2/km^{2}). There were 291 housing units at an average density of 534.6 per square mile (206.4/km^{2}). The racial makeup of the village was 92.72% White, 0.31% African American, 0.46% Native American, 0.15% Asian, 5.42% from other races, and 0.93% from two or more races. Hispanic or Latino of any race were 9.13% of the population.

There were 254 households, out of which 33.9% had children under the age of 18 living with them, 56.7% were married couples living together, 7.5% had a female householder with no husband present, and 31.1% were non-families. 28.0% of all households were made up of individuals, and 12.2% had someone living alone who was 65 years of age or older. The average household size was 2.54 and the average family size was 3.13.

The median age was 36 years. The age distribution was: 29.4% under 18, 7.7% from 18 to 24, 28.2% from 25 to 44, 20.3% from 45 to 64, and 14.4% aged 65 years or older. For every 100 females, there were 120.5 males. For every 100 females age 18 and over, there were 105.4 males.

As of 2000 the median income for a household in the village was $31,389, and the median income for a family was $38,194. Males had a median income of $27,102 versus $17,188 for females. The per capita income for the village was $14,941. About 9.7% of families and 12.7% of the population were below the poverty line, including 24.4% of those under age 18 and 7.8% of those age 65 or over.

== Education ==
It is in the Overton Public Schools school district.

== See also ==
- DeWitty, Nebraska
