= Communication Linking Protocol =

Communications protocol

Communication Linking Protocol (CLP) is a communications protocol used to communicate with many devices using the Motorola ReFLEX network. CLP allows a user to direct a ReFLEX capable device to send or receive messages. CLP is used by Advantra's ReFLEX devices. Advantra's ReFLEX product line was purchased by Inilex who now manufactures the devices.
