= Motorola FLEX =

Communications protocol by Motorola

FLEX is a communications protocol developed by Motorola and used in many pagers. FLEX provides one-way communication only (from the provider to the pager device), but a related protocol called ReFLEX provides two-way messaging.

== Protocol ==
Transmission of message data occurs in one of four modes: 1600/2, 3200/2, 3200/4, or 6400/4. All modes use FSK modulation. At 1600/2 this is on a 2 level FSK signal transmitted at 1600 bits per second. At 3200/2, this is a 2 level FSK signal transmitted at 3200 bits per second. At 3200/4, this is a 4 level FSK signal transmitted at 1600 symbols per second. Each 4 level symbol represents two bits for a bit rate of 3200 bits per second. At 6400/4, this is a 4 level FSK signal transmitted at 3200 symbols per second or 6400 bits per second.

Data is transmitted in a set of 128 frames that takes 4 minutes to complete. Each frame contains a sync followed by 11 data blocks. The data blocks contain 256, 512 or 1024 bits for 1600, 3200 or 6400 bits per second respectively.

The standard has been designed to allow the pager's receiver to be turned off for a high percentage of the time and therefore save on battery usage.

== Security ==
Transmitted data over FLEX is not natively encrypted, though some providers provide encrypted paging by sending "over the top" encrypted data to capable pagers. A BCH error correcting code is used to improve the integrity of the data, although this is not cryptographically secure.

There have been reported instances of individuals actively listening to pager traffic (private investigators, news organizations, etc.).

== Usage ==
In The Netherlands the emergency services use the Flex-protocol in the nationwide P2000 network for pagers. The traffic on this network can be monitored online.

In South Australia the State's SAGRN network for the Emergency Services paging system (CFS, SES, MFS and SAAS) is run on the FLEX 1600 protocol, and can be monitored online.

In the United States numerous regions use FLEX paging for medical communications. Rush, OSF Healthcare, Allina Health, and many other medical care groups use paging for everything from emergency notifications to patient room services to building maintenance.

== See also ==
- ReFLEX
- Mobitex
- DataTAC
