= Plectron =

Radio receiver

Plectron Corporation
- Company type: Public
- Industry: Electronics, Fire Safety
- Founded: 1955
- Fate: termination 1996
- Headquarters: Overton, Nebraska, USA
- Key people: Arlyn H. Collins, Keith Wycoff
- Products: Radio Receivers, Fire helmets, Public Safety

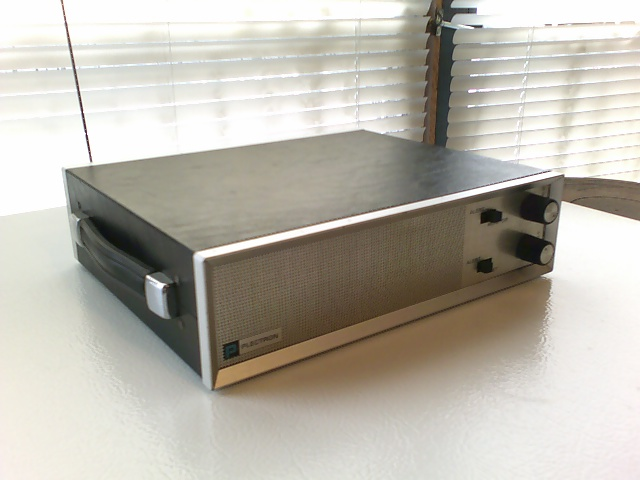
Plectron R-520 receiver manufactured in 1974.

A Plectron is a specialized VHF/UHF single-channel, emergency alerting radio receiver, used to activate emergency response personnel, and disaster warning systems. Manufactured from the late 1950s, through the late 1990s, by the now defunct Plectron Corporation in Overton, Nebraska, hundreds of thousands of these radios were placed in homes of first responders across all of North America. This included ambulance crews, full-time and volunteer firefighters, off-duty specialized police response teams, Civil Defense members, and search and rescue teams.

A Plectron's main feature (distinguishing it from a regular squelched radio) was its selective de-squelching. It would only sound when a correct pair of tones was broadcast – allowing many agencies (with different tones) to share the same frequency. Some Plectron models had a set of built-in rechargeable batteries, making it portable.

== See also ==
- Telex
- National Emergency Alarm Repeater
- Motorola
- Motorola Minitor
- Pager
- Radio
- Communication
- Firefighting
- Dispatching
