= National Emergency Alarm Repeater =

Device that was available in the United States

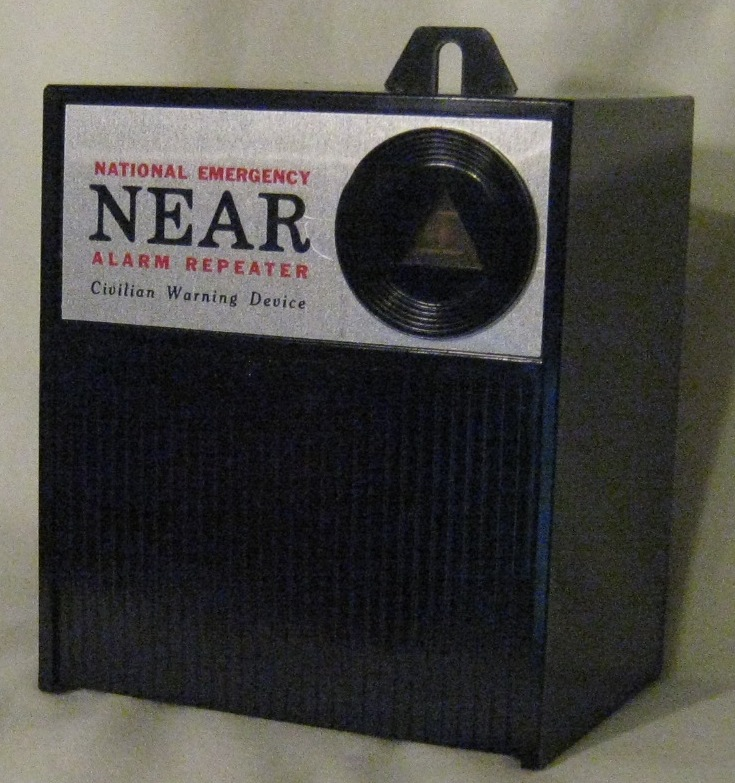
The NEAR warning device

The National Emergency Alarm Repeater (NEAR) was a civilian emergency warning device in the United States. It was a 2–3" (5–7.5 cm) square box designed to plug into a standard power outlet to receive a special signal sent over the electric power transmission lines. Research and testing for the NEAR program was developed in 1956 during the Cold War to supplement the existing siren warning systems and radio broadcasts in the event of a nuclear attack. The advent of the radio Emergency Broadcast System rendered NEAR obsolete, although a severe disadvantage inherent in the Emergency Broadcast System was that it required a television or radio to be turned on for a household to receive the emergency alarm, whereas NEAR did not. Despite this advantage, upon the introduction of the Emergency Broadcast System, stockpiled NEAR repeaters were destroyed by their respective manufacturers.

A similar program was proposed in the United Kingdom during the 1960s.

== Time magazine article ==
A Time magazine article in the 14 November 1960 issue outlined a new program supplementing the then "basically unsound" warning system consisting of localized sirens and the CONELRAD radio-alert system.

The United States Army argued that in the age of intercontinental ballistic missiles a civil-defense warning system should be capable of warning 90% of the population within 30 seconds after a signal is given by the national civil-defense center in Colorado Springs.

The device is a buzzer installed into ordinary electrical outlets. The devices would be set off in an emergency by altering the regular AC signal being generated and transmitted by the local power companies. This would be done by having a specific alternating current of a specific frequency superimposed upon it; the imposed current would be generated by special generators and would be at 270 Hz at 3 volts RMS for 50,000 cycles (U.S. patent 3,284,791), approximately three minutes.

Civil Defense logo on a Thunderbolt 1003 siren

The indoor buzzers would be supplemented with outdoor warning sirens.

The Federal Civil Defense Administration (FCDA) logo

An episode of the PBS television program History Detectives suggested that problems with NEAR might have included limited instructions on what to do when an alert was received and the device's inability to provide information on what exactly was happening. EMP effects of a high-altitude nuclear detonation could have disabled the system. After a decade of federal support for testing and development, the program was terminated.

== See also ==
- Handel
- Plectron
