= Motorola Minitor =

Emergency analog pager

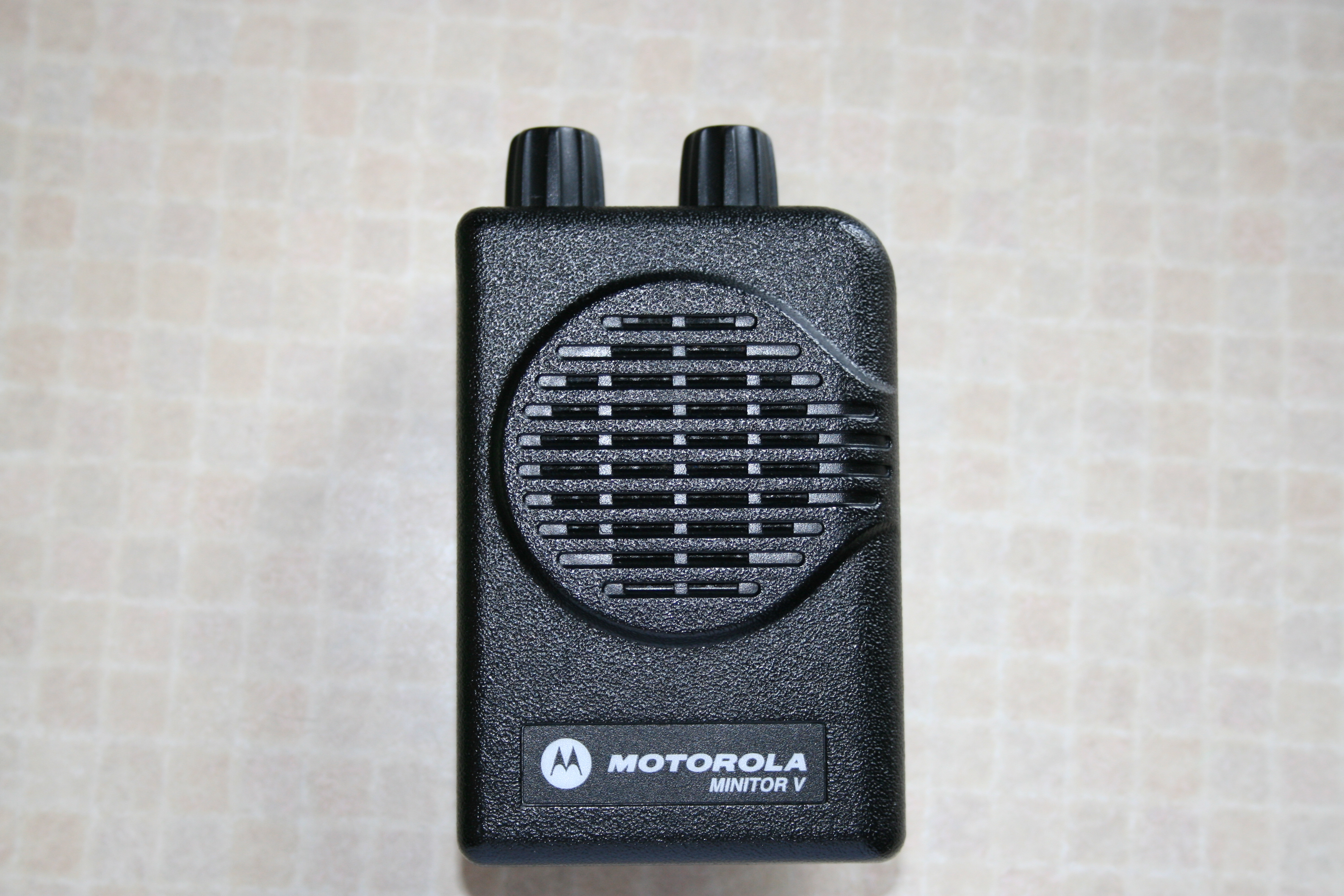
Front view of the Minitor V pager.

The Motorola Minitor is a portable, analog, receive only, voice pager typically carried by civil defense organizations such as fire, rescue, and EMS personnel (both volunteer and career) to alert of emergencies. The Minitor, slightly smaller than a pack of cigarettes, is carried on a person and usually left in selective call mode. When the unit is activated, the pager sounds a tone alert, followed by an announcement from a dispatcher alerting the user of a situation. After activation, the pager remains in monitor mode much like a scanner, and monitors transmissions on that channel until the unit is reset back into selective call mode either manually, or automatically after a set period of time, depending on programming.

== Purpose and history ==
In the times before modern radio communications, it was difficult for emergency services such as volunteer fire departments to alert their members to an emergency, since the members were not based at the station. The earliest methods of sounding an alarm would typically be by ringing a bell either at the fire station or the local church. As electricity became available, most fire departments used fire sirens or whistles to summon volunteers (many fire departments still use outdoor sirens and horns along with pagers to alert volunteers). Other methods included specialized phones placed inside the volunteer firefighter's home or business or by base radios or scanners. "Plectron" radio receivers were very popular, but were limited to 120VAC or 12VDC operation, limiting their use to a house/building or mounted in a vehicle. There was a great need and desire for a portable radio small enough to be worn by a person and only activated when needed. Thus, Motorola answered this call in the 1970s and released the very first Minitor pager.

There are seven versions of Minitor pagers. The first was the original Minitor, followed by the Minitor II(1992), Minitor III(1999), Minitor IV, and the Minitor V released in late 2005. The Minitor VI was released in early 2014. The Minitor VII was released in 2025. The Minitor III, IV, and V used the same basic design, while the original Minitor and Minitor II use their own rectangular proprietary case design. Similar voice pagers released by Motorola were the Keynote and Director pagers. They were essentially stripped down versions of the Minitor and never gained widespread use, though the Keynotes were much more common in Europe because they could decode 5/6 tone alert patterns in addition to the more popular two tone sequential used in the United States.

Although the Minitor is primarily used by emergency personnel, other agencies such as utilities and private contractors also use the pager. Unlike conventional alphanumeric pagers and cell phones, Minitors are operated on an RF network that is generally restricted to a particular agency in a given geographical area. The Minitor is the most common voice pager used by emergency services in the United States. However, digital 2-way pagers that can display alpha-numeric characters can overcome some of the limitations of voice only pagers, are now starting to replace the Minitor pagers in certain applications.

== Activation ==
Indian Creek Fire Department (Fayetteville, IN) paging tones activating Motorola Minitor pager.

Minitor pagers, depending on the model and application, can operate in the VHF low band, VHF high band, and UHF frequency ranges. They are alerted by using two-tone sequential selective calling, generally following the Motorola Quick Call II standard. In other words, the pager will activate when a particular series of audible tones are sent over the frequency (commonly referred to as a "page") the pager is set to. For example, if a Minitor is programmed on VHF frequency channel 155.295 MHz and set to alert for 879 Hz & 358.6 Hz, it will disregard any other tone sequences transmitted on that frequency, only alerting when the proper sequence has been received. The pager may be reset back into its selective call mode by pressing the reset button, or it can be programmed to reset back into selective call mode automatically after a predetermined amount of time, to conserve battery power.

Older Minitor pagers (both the Minitor I and Minitor II series) have tone reeds or filters that are tuned to a specific audible tone frequency, and must physically be replaced if alert tones are changed. For two-tone sequential paging, there are two reeds, the first tone passes through the first reed, and the second tone passes through the second reed, thereby activating the pager. Beginning with the Minitor III series, these physical reeds or filters are no longer necessary, as the pagers now feature all solid-state electronics, and various tone sequences can be programmed via computer software.

Newer Minitor pagers can scan two channels by selecting that function via a rotary knob on the pager; in this mode when using a Minitor III or IV the user will hear all traffic, even without the correct tones being sent. If the activation tones are transmitted in this monitor mode, the pager alerts as normal. Minitor Vs have the option to remain in monitor mode or in selective call mode when scanning two channels. Minitor IIIs and IVs only have the option to remain in monitor mode when scanning two channels.

The range of the Minitor's operating distance depends on the strength (wattage) of the paging transmitter. A repeater is often used to improve paging coverage, as it can be located for better range than the dispatch center where the page originates from. Weather conditions, low battery, and even atmospheric conditions can affect the Minitor's ability to receive transmissions. In fact, a remote transmitter hundreds, even thousands of miles away belonging to a separate agency, can activate a Minitor (and also block it) unknowingly if the atmospheric conditions let the signal propagate that far. This is commonly known as radio skip.

The Minitor is a receive-only unit, not a transceiver, and thus cannot transmit.

== Features ==
Note - most all of the features below refer to the Minitor pagers III and up, the original Minitor and Minitor II pagers may not have some of the listed features

- Newer generation Minitor pagers can simultaneously scan up to two channels and have multiple activation tones. This can be very helpful if a user belongs to several emergency services, or the emergency service has different alarms for different emergencies.
- Alert tones - The default, and most common alert is the continuous beeping (sounds like "beep-beep-beep-beep...etc.)". Other alarms can include a steady high pitched tones, and the newest Minitor V's can even have musical tones for general non-emergency announcements.
- VIBRA-Page - For silent alarm activation, most Minitor pagers can also vibrate without sounding an alarm tone. This is particularly useful in churches, schools, meetings, etc. where a loud noise would be disruptive. This feature is known as "VIBRA-Page".
- Voice record - Many Minitor pagers can also record (up to 8 minutes, depending on the model and options) of voice/transmission after the pager activates.
- Controls - Physical controls (specifically on the Minitor III) include an "A, B, C, D" function knob, a power/volume knob, reset button, voice playback button, external speaker jack, and an amber and red LED. Depending on the model, the selection on the function knobs may do different things.
- Control examples - For example, function A may be selective call mode, while function B is the vibrate function. Function C monitors channel 2. D is the mode that is similar to a scanner. When the pager is turned on, eight short beeps are heard along with flashing of both LEDs. Holding down the reset button in selective call mode will monitor the channel for any transmission on that channel at that time, or pure static as the squelch is bypassed.
- Field-programmable - Some models have field programmable options such as non-priority scan, alert duration, priority alert, on/off duty, reset options, and push-to-listen. Many Minitor pagers can be hooked up to a computer with a special cable and options changed.
- Durability - Unlike older models, the Minitor V is "rainproof" as it meets Military Standard 810, Procedure 1 for driving rain.
- Belt clip - A spring-loaded clip is attached to the back of each Minitor to allow the user to clip the pager onto a pocket or belt. Also, carrying cases and covers are also made to protect the pager.
- Charging - Minitor pagers come standard with a charging stand and two rechargeable batteries.
- Amplified base unit - An optional charger/amplifier base can be bought. Bigger than the standard charging stand, the charger/amplifier base not only charges the pager, but has an external antenna for increased reception, an amplified audio out jack to drive a stand-alone speaker, and some models even incorporate a relay to activate external devices along with the pager. Some uses for this relay include: Turning on lights in a building such as a fire station, activating an external audio/visual alarm, etc.
- Accessories - Official Motorola accessories for the Minitor pagers include (including some listed above): desktop battery charger, desktop battery charger/amplifier with antenna and relay, vehicular charger/amplifier with relay, earpieces, extra-loud lapel speaker, and nylon carrying case.

== Disadvantages ==
The audible alarm on the Minitor lasts only for the duration of the second activation tone. If there is bad reception, the pager may only sound a quick beep, and the user may not be alerted properly. This can be changed by editing the codeplug's alert duration from STD to fixed, the user can then set the alert duration longer than the second tone. The user must be cautious, however, as setting the alert tone duration too high may cover some voice information. Also, some units may have the volume knob set to control the sound output of the audible alert as well. The user may have the volume turned down to an undetectable level either by accident or by carelessness, thus missing the page. A factory option for fixed alert (the only option on the earlier Minitor I), however, lets the alert tone override the volume and sound at maximum volume regardless of the volume knob's position. It is possible to program the pager to always vibrate when an alert is received, giving the possibility of either a silent (vibrating) alert or audible and vibrating alerts. Minitor I and II do not have vibrating capabilities standard).

The vibrating motor in the newer (IV and V) Minitor pagers is quite strong in order to be felt in varying conditions, such as when performing heavy work. It is not uncommon for the vibrating motor in a pager, placed in a charger overnight and left in vibrate mode, to "walk" the pager and charger off of a table or nightstand.

Minitor pagers are powered by battery which will eventually run down if not charged (a flashing red LED and audible alarm is used as a warning of low battery power). As the Minitor is portable, its electronics aren't as sensitive as set top or base radios and are usually less able to pick up weak or distant signals.

== See also ==
- Selective calling
- Radio receiver
- Plectron
- Dispatching
