= Rare bird alert =

A rare bird alert (RBA) is a system for collecting and disseminating information about sightings of uncommon or unexpected bird species, usually specific to a particular region. Birders are known for sharing information with each other about the locations of unusual birds for recreation, documentation, or competition, and have used a variety of technologies to do so. Starting in the 1950s, telephone hotlines centralized reports using answering machines, replacing calling trees and becoming an important part of birding culture. Well over a hundred such lines operated in North America by the end of the 20th century. The internet, and especially eBird and social media platforms, largely replaced telephone systems in the 21st century, enabling real-time sharing with geographic precision. The speed and reach of internet-based alerts made birds and birding more accessible to the public, but have also led to controversy for the way they can draw crowds that may harass the birds.

== Background ==
Birders (or birdwatchers) observe birds for recreation, citizen science, or even competition. It is common for birders to seek out species that are rare (sometimes called "twitching"), either for the new observational experience, to better document patterns of migration and behavior, or to expand the size of a personal checklist of observed birds. Before rare bird alert hotlines, birders would use telephone calling trees whereby participants would, upon receiving a call, be responsible for calling a set list of other participants. This progressed to a centralized calling and answering service where reports would be centrally screened and then disseminated to members of the service, often for a fee.

== Telephone ==
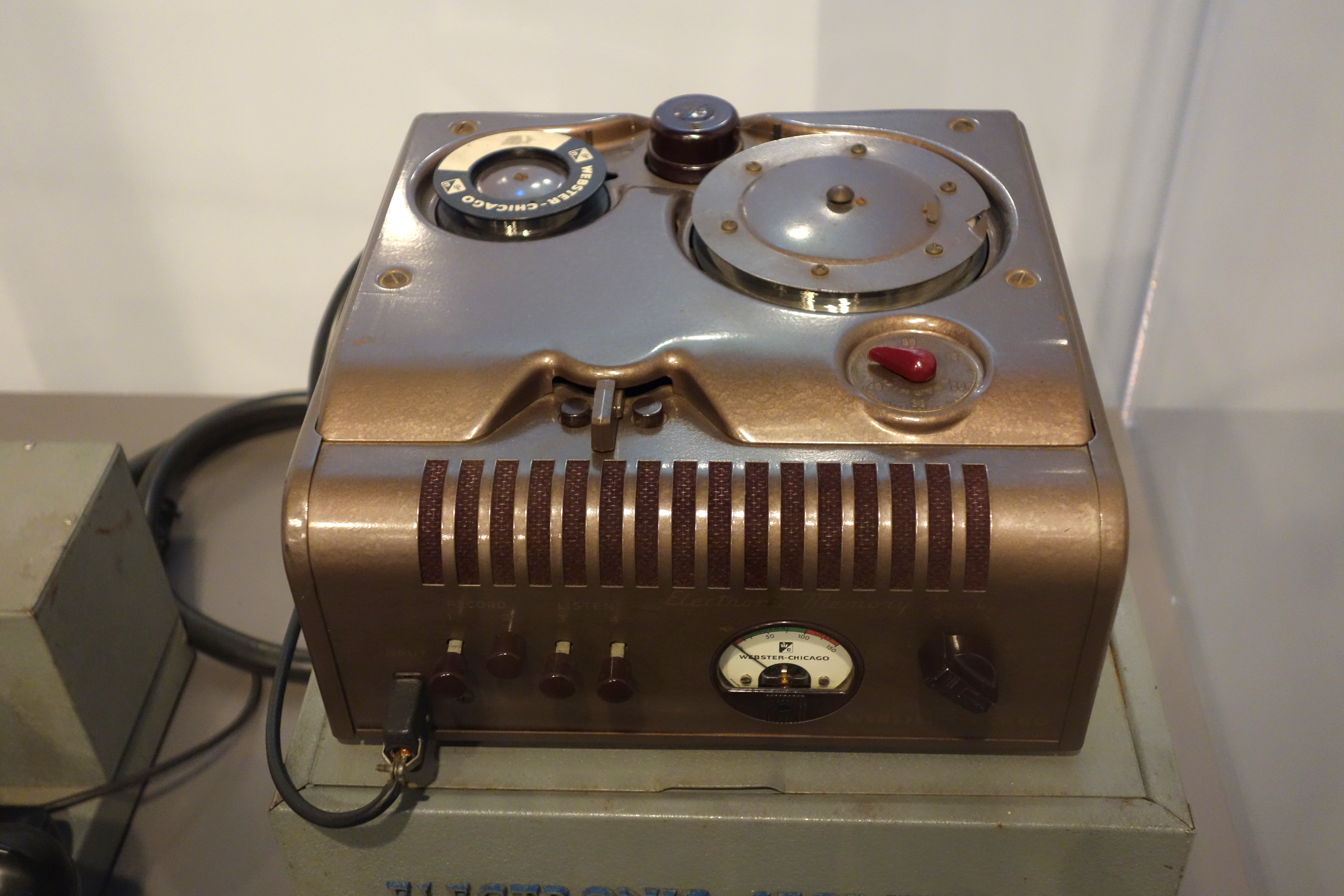
A 1949 Electronic Secretary answering machine, one of several models available when the first bird alert hotlines launched

Rare bird alert hotlines, sometimes called dial-a-bird numbers, have been used to centralize bird sightings since the 1950s. Rather than a calling service, whereby one central location receives reports and then calls all subscribers, rare bird alert hotlines collect reports and disseminate summaries via answering machine messages. Reports come through messages left on the machine, postal mail, email, or other communications. While the information provided on some alerts is simple, others include details about the bird and its identification, or instructions for where and when to find it. In some cases, they include other bird-related news unrelated to immediate sightings.

The first RBA hotline was the Voice of Audubon operated by the Massachusetts Audubon Society, covering the eastern half of the state. It appeared amid a trend of hotlines created with new recording technology, alongside services like weather reports. Existing phone calls overwhelmed Audubon's phone system, and the organization saw an answering machine as a way to centralize the activity. It went live in 1954, run by staff member Ruth Emery. The Western Voice of Audubon launched a decade later to cover the other half of the state. Years later, as equipment prices came down, the DC-area Audubon Society launched in 1968. In New York City, the Audubon Society and Linnaean Society co-sponsored a rare bird alert phone line called the Metropolitan Rare Bird Alert System starting around 1970, listing rare species as well as detailed directions about how to find them. Susan Roney Drennan wrote in American Birds that the NYC line was the "creme de la creme of RBAs", with recordings typically running about six minutes including detailed descriptions of birds and directions to see them, as well as upcoming bird-related events, and current conservation issues. "A new caller senses he is watching, from a box seat, the current ornithological pageant pass in view". As of 1973, the Massachusetts alerts received about 1,000 calls per week and the New York City line received 500.

Audubon magazine called telephone RBAs "one of birding's most historical and influential institutions" which "once set the rhythm for the lives of serious birders. The dispatches and the pursuits that followed were ritualized, narrow, and highly curated." There were about 150 rare bird alert lines in the United States and Canada by the 1990s. Most were run by non-profits, individuals, or other small groups, but there was at least one commercial service, a national hotline called the North American Rare Bird Alert (NARBA) that had answering machine-based recordings as well as a calling system whereby subscribers could elect to receive all reports or just those of certain species. Though the internet largely rendered phone-based hotlines obsolete, a small number remain. The Metropolitan Rare Bird Alert System is active as of 2025, run by the same person, Tom Burke, for nearly forty years. The most active remaining hotline is the Bobolink Area Rare Bird Alert in Ohio, run by Amish birders who do not use the internet.

=== Pagers ===
Systems like BirdNet and SwiftAlert use pagers to notify users of bird sightings. These were especially popular in Europe, although NARBA also supported pagers.

== Internet ==
=== Email ===
Many email-based listservs emerged by the early 2000s, with reports collected by a single address and then disseminated to list members. For example, BirdEast, BirdWest, and BirdCtr were lists operated by the National Bird Hotline Cooperative. Some email services were limited to alerts while others encouraged discussion of identifications and socializing.

=== Social media ===
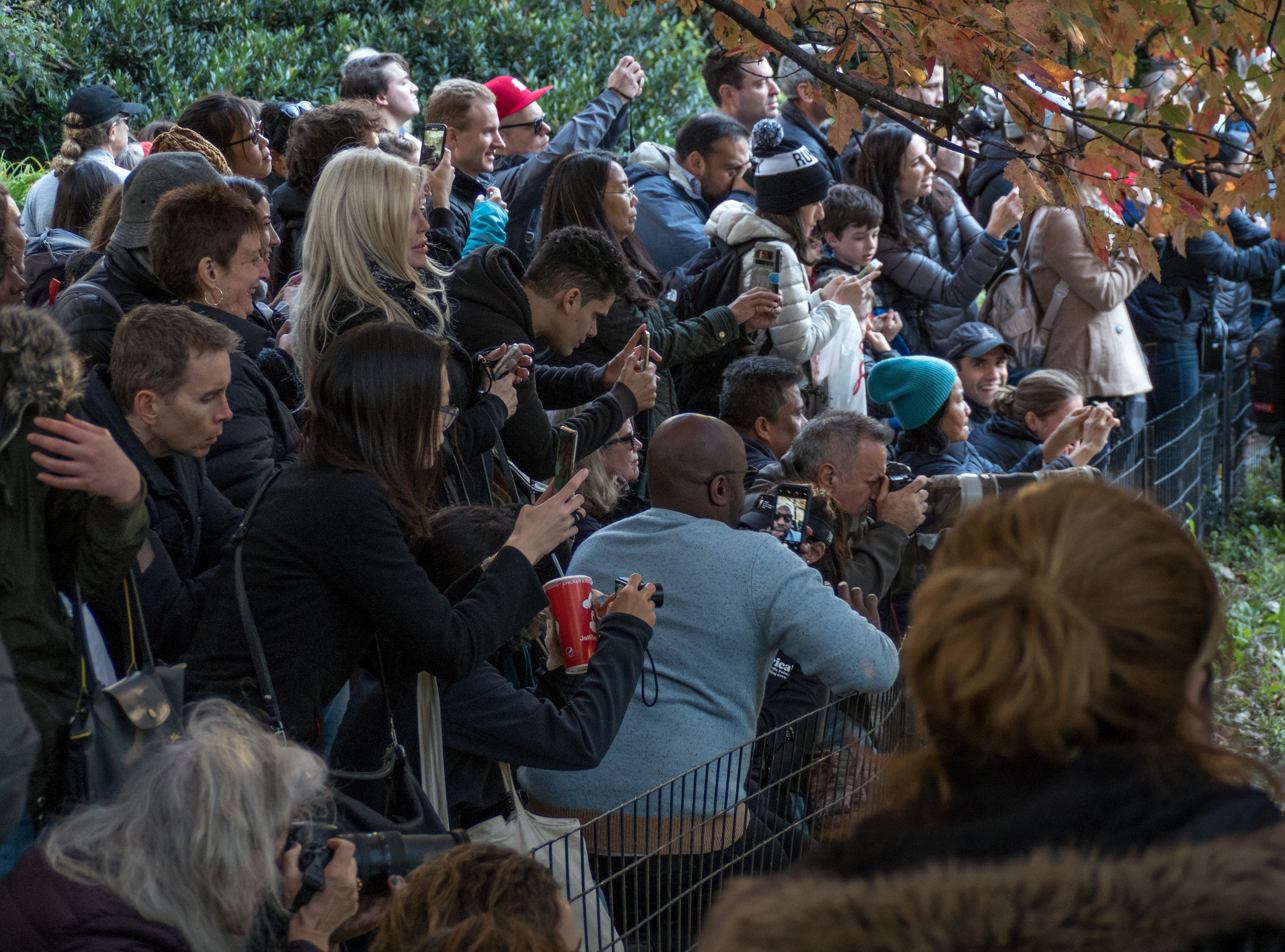
A crowd gathered to watch the Central Park Mandarin duck in 2018

The internet has made it easier to share sightings and track what species other people have seen, and whereas the phone systems were updated only once or a few times per week, social media in particular makes it easy to share sightings instantly and with large audiences on platforms like Facebook, Reddit, or Twitter, where sightings have been shared via hashtags since at least 2011. Developments in GPS and navigation tools enable sharing precise locations instantly, or even custom maps.

The internet has made birds and birding more accessible, giving more people the opportunity to participate and to see rare birds, potentially promoting greater appreciation of birds in particular and nature in general. But the practice of sharing bird alerts is both popular and controversial. In densely populated places a public report can result in a large crowd flocking to see a rare bird. Critics argue the crowds are harmful, both because of the number of people and because the publicity draws not just ethical birders but members of the public who may not prioritize the well-being of the bird over their own curiosity or desire for photos. Organizations like NYC Bird Alliance specifically criticize sharing information about sensitive birds like owls, which rest during the day and hunt at night.

In New York City, The New York Times characterized the issue as "a vigorous debate ... roiling the city's birding community". It highlighted a set of Twitter accounts, Manhattan Bird Alert and its counterparts for other boroughs, which have tens of thousands of followers. The operator, David Barrett, aims to "make everyone's birding more effective" and draw people to a new hobby, and they have been credited with introducing birds and birding to new audiences. Some birds followed by the accounts went on to become celebrities, like the Central Park mandarin duck and Flaco the owl. But the accounts have also received a backlash among some birders and conservationists concerned for the well-being of the birds. Ken Chaya of the Linnaean Society of New York highlighted "a fine line between sharing information about a sensitive bird and creating a flash mob".

Aubudon magazine, writing about the New York City Twitter alerts, said the operator's "prominence and the backlash against him are emblematic of tensions playing out on smaller stages across the country." Though the dense population of New York City makes it more likely that large crowds will form, use of social media to broadcast locations has been controversial elsewhere, too, whether due to crowding and chasing the bird or due to the frustration of residents in areas where the crowds gather. In 2016, hundreds gathered to see a northern hawk-owl on private property in Washington. After multiple requests by the landowner not to take photos, the bird was found shot.

=== Messaging apps ===
Messaging apps allow for sharing reports widely without broadcasting them openly to audiences that are not otherwise interested in birds. Apps like Discord, WhatsApp, and GroupMe are popular, and enable gatekeeping of both membership and individual posts to enforce ethical or interpersonal rules.

=== eBird ===
The Cornell Lab of Ornithology operates a service called eBird which solicits citizen scientists to submit checklists of birds via the web or a mobile app. The resulting database can then be searched and the data processed. Among the uses of the data is a rare bird alert service for regions around the world, delivered by email on a daily or hourly basis. Some information is restricted for species considered sensitive. The pursuit of rare birds can skew data on eBird, for example when a single rare bird is present for a single week, but hundreds of reports can make it seem the bird is more likely to appear there in the future. A focus on rare species in particular can also distract from the primary purpose of the eBird project, which relies on consistent effort to document even common species to track broad patterns over time.

== In popular culture ==
- The composition Telephones and Birds (1977) by John Cage is inspired by bird alerts, with calls to a national bird alert hotline incorporated into the performance
- Bird alerts are mentioned frequently in documentaries about birding, such as Listers: A Glimpse Into Extreme Birdwatching (2025).
