= DeWitty, Nebraska =

Ghost town in Nebraska, U.S.

Coordinates: 42.2846°N 100.5363°W

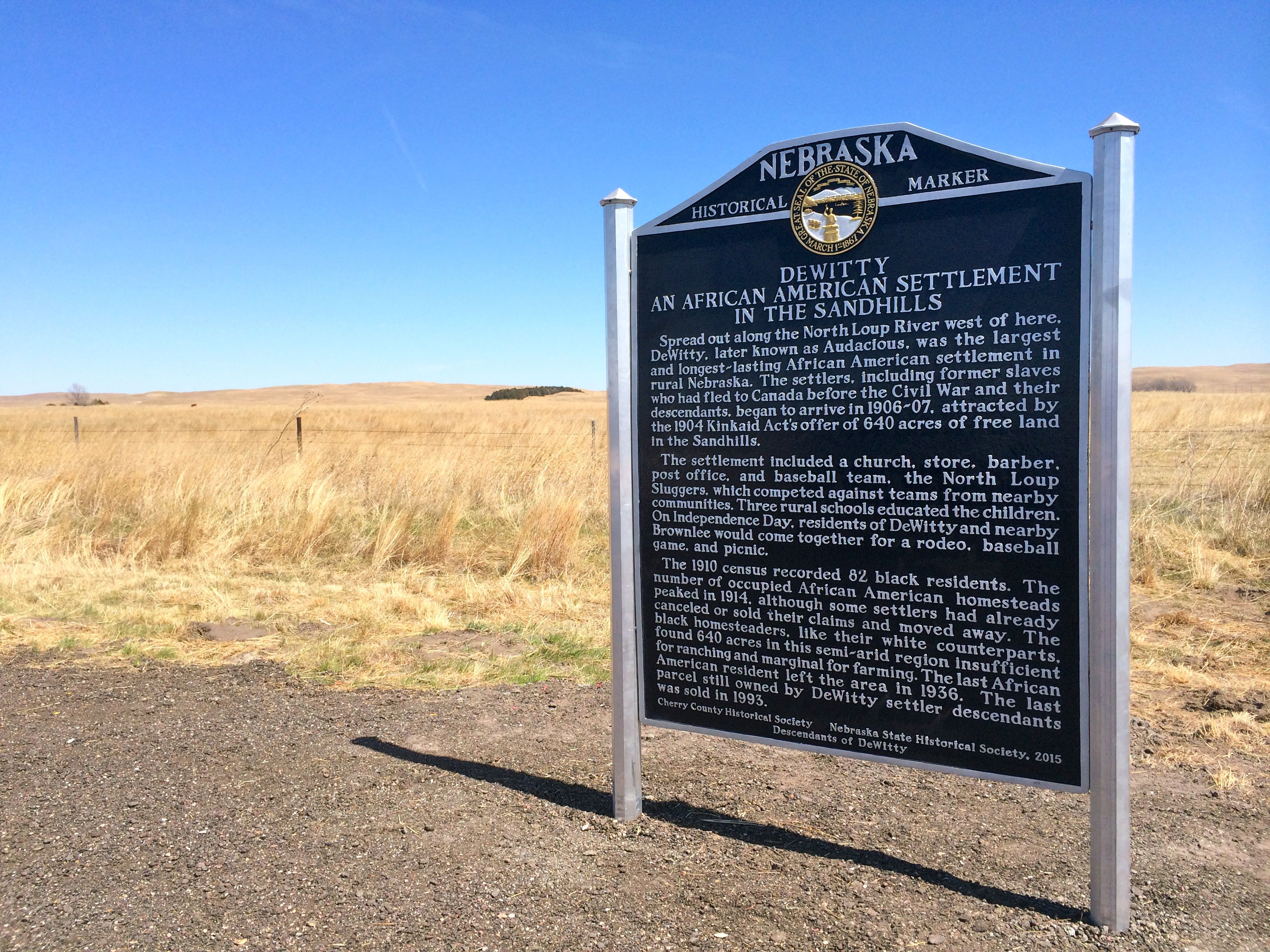
A Nebraska State Historical Society roadside marker commemorating DeWitty was installed and dedicated on U.S. Highway 83 April 11, 2016.

DeWitty, later renamed Audacious, was a village in Cherry County, Nebraska, United States. The settlement, which was founded in 1907 and disincorporated in 1936, was located 10 miles (20 km) north and west of Brownlee. DeWitty was Nebraska's "largest and most permanent colony" of African American homesteaders.

== History ==
The 1904 Kinkaid Act amended the Homestead Act to provide 640-acre land claims (260 ha) in Nebraska's Sand Hills. This lured a number of African-American families to move to the area. By 1910 twenty-four families filed claim to 14,000 acres (57 km^{2}) of land in Cherry County. By 1920 185 African Americans claimed 40,000 acres (160 km^{2}) around DeWitty, a small town named after a local African American business owner.

Clem Deaver was the first African American to file a homestead claim in Cherry County as a "Kinkaider". While working in Seneca, a railroad town, Deaver went to Valentine to claim land. There he learned that 50,000 acres (200 km^{2}) of unclaimed land were available 10 miles (20 km) northwest of Brownlee. The tract bordered the North Loup River for almost 15 miles (24 km) in the eastern part of Cherry County. He returned to Seneca and started promoting the land. By 1907 sod houses of new settlers dotted the land. Within a few years, black Canadian farmers who settled near Overton in Dawson County joined the settlement, bringing the population to 66. By 1917, the settlement had 100 families.

During the town's history, it was renamed Audacious. A church was started in 1910 by Reverend O.J. Burchkardt, a missionary of the African Methodist Episcopal Church in Lincoln. The town had a post office, a baseball team, a barber, a general store, and three school districts for area students. An annual picnic was held in August, to which residents of Brownlee were invited. The town cemetery includes almost twenty burial sites. Many of DeWitty's young men served in World War I and returned after the war.

Droughts and crop failures following World War I caused DeWitty's families to mortgage their properties. Many lost their claims to bankers, as did small farmers throughout the Great Plains. They discovered that the Plains were not good for subsistence farming. The last resident to leave DeWitty sold his land to neighboring white ranchers in 1936. DeWitty's population trends were similar to those of African-American farming settlements throughout Nebraska. Nonetheless, DeWitty was described as an important contribution to the development of agricultural communities throughout the American West during the time of the Kinkaid Act.

On April 11, 2016, The Nebraska State Historical Society installed a roadside marker on U.S. Highway 83 to commemorate the DeWitty settlement. Approximately 200 attended the dedication ceremony, including 18 descendants who traveled from six different states to be there.
