= ReFLEX =

ReFLEX is a wireless protocol developed by Motorola (now Motorola Solutions), used for two-way paging, messaging, and low-bandwidth data. It is based on the FLEX one-way paging protocol, adding capabilities for multiple forward channels, multiple return channels, and roaming. It originally came in two variants, ReFLEX25 and ReFLEX50. ReFLEX50 was originally developed to support a messaging service launched by MTEL in the mid 1990s, while ReFLEX25 was developed several years later to provide an upgrade path for traditional one-way paging carriers. The 50 and 25 signified 50 kHz and 25kHz channel spacing, although in reality both variants supported flexible channel configurations. The two variants were unified into a single protocol with version 2.7, which was released simply as ReFLEX 2.7. Devices compliant with ReFLEX 2.7 are backwards compatible with both ReFLEX25 and ReFLEX50 networks, with several new features to improve roaming, performance, and interoperability between different networks. ReFLEX systems support forward channel speeds of 1600, 3200, and 6400 bits per second, and return channel speeds of 800, 1600, 6400, and 9600 bits per second. Like FLEX, ReFLEX is synchronous, based on 1.875 second frames and 4-level FSK modulation.

The Motorola PageWriter released in 1996 was one of the first devices to use the ReFLEX network protocol. Although ReFLEX now has limited viability in the commercial market, it is finding new uses in Automatic Meter Reading, public safety, and low cost/bandwidth M2M applications.

== See also ==
- DataTAC
- Mobitex
- Communication Linking Protocol
