= PageNet =

Wireless messaging company

Paging Network, Inc., also known as PageNet, was founded in 1981 by entrepreneur George Perrin and ceased in 1999.

The company grew to become the largest wireless messaging company in the world, with more than 10 million pagers in service, and $1 billion in revenues, before the paging industry's rapid decline in the late 1990s.

== Operations ==
Based in Dallas, PageNet held the distinction of building and operating the most extensive one-way paging network in the United States, growing to more than 90 offices across the United States. The company extended operations to Canada and Brazil.

The company was known for its low-cost strategy and aggressive marketing tactics, although in its later years it positioned itself as a technology innovator as well.

== Financial difficulties ==
PageNet's fortunes began to decline in the late 1990s, when the company spent nearly $1 billion to purchase additional spectrum and build out a new network designed to offer advanced services, such as voice paging and two-way paging.

Products developed by Motorola for PageNet's network were unsuccessful, as was a reorganization of the company engineered by McKinsey & Company. Ironically, PageNet had an opportunity to purchase the network that went on to support the successful BlackBerry service, but decided to team with Motorola instead.

As PageNet sank under the weight of its investment, the one-way paging market collapsed—with millions of former paging customers switching to digital cellular and PCS services, which cut prices dramatically while offering new features such as nationwide calling plans and text messaging. Under its last CEO, John P. Frazee, Jr., PageNet was sold to Boston-based Arch Communications in 1999. That company has since merged with Metrocall to form USA Mobility.

== See also ==
- Defunct telecommunications companies of the United States
