= Wireless Communications Transfer Protocol =

Network protocol

Wireless Communications Transfer Protocol (WCTP) is the method used to send messages to wireless devices such as pagers on NPCS (Narrowband PCS) networks. It uses HTTP as a transport layer over the World Wide Web.

Development of WCTP was initiated by the Messaging Standards Committee and submitted to the Radio Paging Community. When the first proposal was received, a sub-committee was established to improve the protocol and issue it as a specification. The sub-committee was moved into the PTC (Paging Technical Committee) which is a volunteer committee composed of industry representatives. The PCIA (Personal Communications Industry) accepted the first full release and adopted the protocol as a PCIA standard. The current version is WCTP 1.3.
