= Simple Network Paging Protocol =

Networking protocol for pagers

Simple Network Paging Protocol (SNPP) is a protocol that defines a method by which a pager can receive a message over the Internet. It is supported by most major paging providers, and serves as an alternative to the paging modems used by many telecommunications services. The protocol was most recently described in RFC 1861. It is a fairly simple protocol that may run over TCP port 444 and sends out a page using only a handful of well-documented commands.

== Connecting and using SNPP servers ==
It is relatively easy to connect to a SNPP server, only requiring a telnet client and the address of the SNPP server. The port 444 is standard for SNPP servers, and it is free to use from the sender's point of view. Maximum message length can be carrier-dependent. Once connected, a user can simply enter the commands to send a message to a pager connected to that network. For example, a PAGE command with the number of the device specifies the device to send the message to. The MESS command sets the text of the message to be sent to the text following it. The message is sent out by issuing the SEND command. The session is ended with the QUIT command, or be continued with more sets of commands to send another message to a different device. The protocol also allows multiple PAGE commands for one message, stacked one after the other, allowing a same message to be sent to several devices on the network with one MESS and SEND command pair.
