= Pager =

Wireless telecommunications device

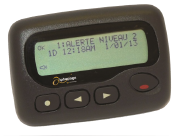
- GSL 28R rechargeable pager
- Type: Wireless telecommunications device
- Inventor: Al Gross
- Inception: 1949; 77 years ago
- Available: Yes
- Current supplier: Various

A pager, also known as a beeper or bleeper, is a wireless telecommunications device that receives and displays alphanumeric or voice messages. One-way pagers can only receive messages, while response pagers and two-way pagers can also acknowledge, reply to, and originate messages using an internal transmitter.

Pagers operate as part of a paging system which includes one or more fixed transmitters (or in the case of response pagers and two-way pagers, one or more base stations), as well as a number of pagers carried by mobile users. These systems can range from a restaurant system with a single low power transmitter, to a nationwide system with thousands of high-power base stations.

Pagers were developed in the 1950s and 1960s, and became widely used by the 1980s through the late 1990s and early 2000s. Into the 21st century, the widespread availability of mobile phones has greatly diminished the pager industry. Nevertheless, pagers, alongside two-way radios, continue to be used by some emergency services and public safety personnel, because modern pager systems' coverage overlap, combined with use of satellite communications, can make paging systems more reliable than terrestrial based cellular networks in some cases, including during natural and human-made disasters. This resilience has led public safety agencies to adopt pagers over cellular and other commercial services for critical messaging.

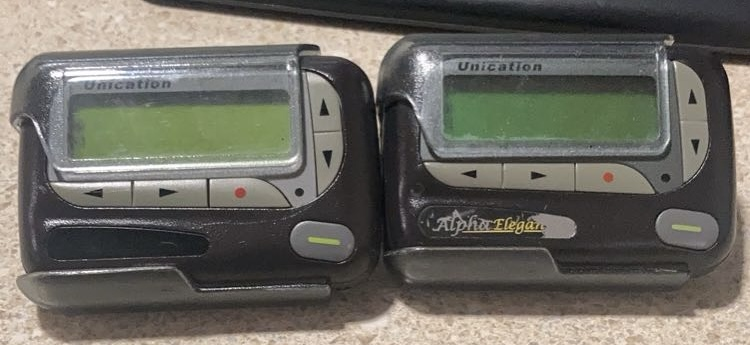
Two pagers

== History ==
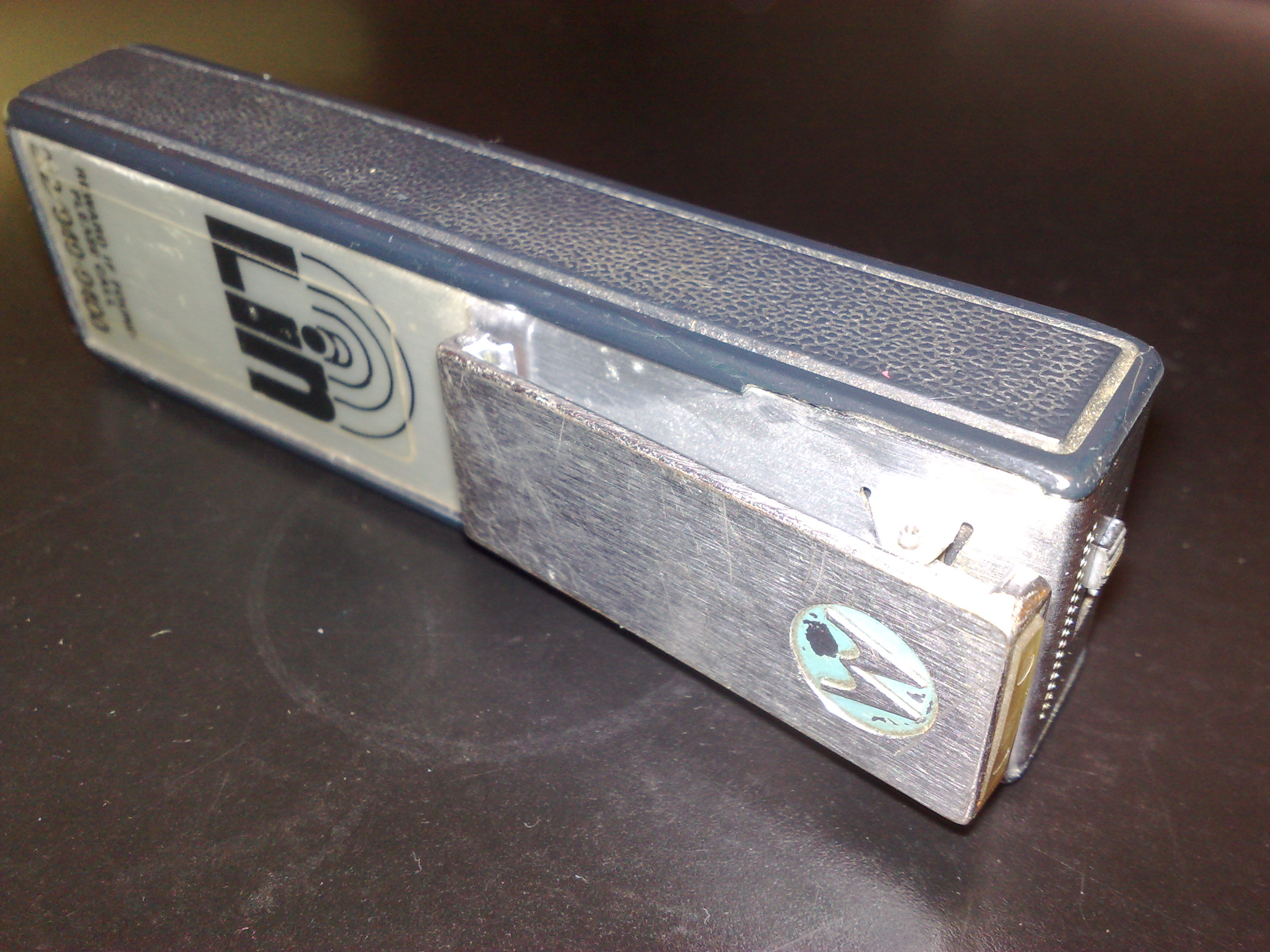
Original Motorola "Pageboy II" pager, used in New York in the late 1970s.

The first telephone pager system was patented in 1949 by Al Gross. Intended for the use of physicians, there was initial resistance to the idea of being permanently on-call, according to Gross.

One of the first practical paging services was launched in 1950 for physicians in the New York City area. Physicians paid US$12 per month and carried a 200-gram (7 oz) pager that would receive phone messages within 40 kilometres (25 mi) of a single transmitter tower. The system was manufactured by the Reevesound Company and operated by Telanswerphone. In 1960, John Francis Mitchell combined elements of Motorola's walkie-talkie and automobile radio technologies to create the first transistorized pager, and from that time, paging technology continued to advance and pager adoption among emergency personnel was still popular as of July 2016.

In 1962, the Bell System, the U.S. telephone monopoly, presented its Bellboy radio paging system at the Seattle World's Fair. Bellboy was the first commercial system for personal paging. It also marked one of the first consumer applications of the transistor (invented by Bell Labs in 1947), for which three Bell Labs inventors received a Nobel Prize in Physics in 1956. Solid-state circuitry enabled the Bellboy pager, about the size of a small TV remote, to fit into a customer's pocket or purse, which was quite a feat for the time. The Bellboy was a terminal that notified the user when someone was trying to call them. Bell System Bellboy radio pagers each used three reed receiver relays, each relay tuned to one of 33 different frequencies, selectively ringing a particular customer when all three relays were activated at the same time—a precursor of DTMF. When the person received an audible signal (a buzz) on the pager, the user found a telephone and called the service center, which informed the user of the caller's message.

In the mid-1980s, tone and voice radio paging became popular among emergency responders and professionals. Tone and voice pagers were activated either by a local base station, or through a telephone number assigned to each individual pager. In the 1990s, pagers became popular among the general public as a cheaper, smaller, and more reliable alternative to mobile phones. The ReFLEX protocol was developed in the mid-1990s.

As prices for mobile phones declined, small form factor phones like the Motorola StarTAC and the Nokia Series 40 line came on the market, cellular connectivity expanded, and digital phones adopted text messaging, most pager customers outside of specialist fields migrated to mobile phones toward the end of the 1990s. While Motorola announced the end of its new pager manufacturing in 2001, pagers remained in use in large hospital complexes. First responders in rural areas with inadequate cellular coverage are often issued pagers.

The 2005 London bombings resulted in overload of TETRA systems by the emergency services and showed that pagers, with their ability to show a message without transmitting an acknowledgement, and their ability to operate on very low signal levels, still may have an important role in some specific use cases. Volunteer firefighters, EMS paramedics and rescue squad members usually carry pagers to alert them of emergency call outs for their department. These pagers receive a special tone from a fire department radio frequency.

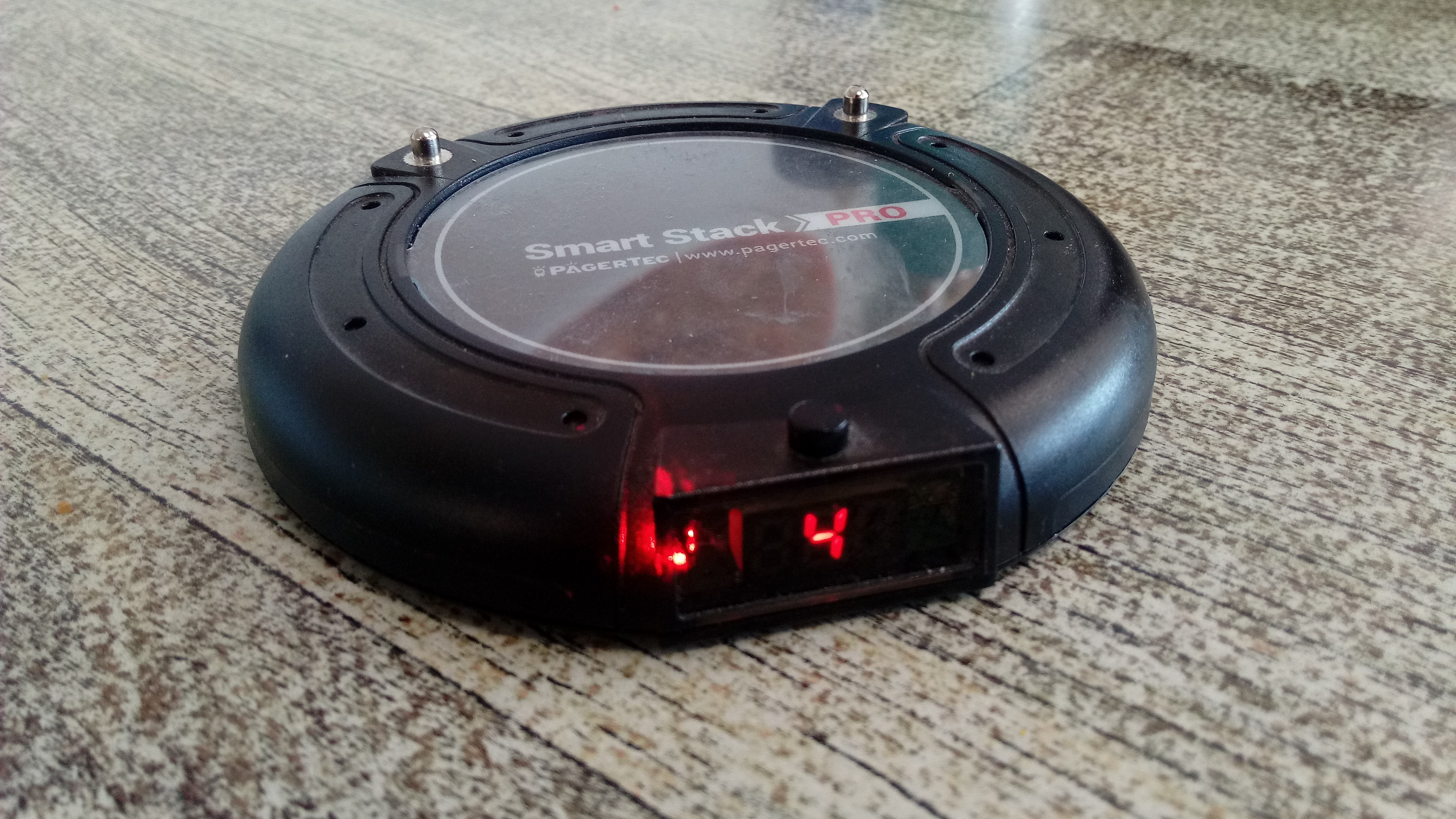
A restaurant pager alerting customers to collect their order

Restaurant pagers remain in wide use since the 2000s. Customers are given a portable receiver that usually vibrates, flashes, or beeps when a table becomes free or when their meal is ready. Pagers have been popular with birdwatchers in Great Britain and Ireland since 1991, with companies such as Rare Bird Alert and Birdnet Information offering news of rare birds sent to pagers that they sell.

Today, companies like Visiplex offer similar solutions for onsite pager systems in the medical, education and commercial sectors.

=== Decline ===
By early 2002, pager usage was rapidly declining in places like North America due to the proliferation of cellular telephones.

The U.S. paging industry generated $2.1 billion in revenue in 2008, down from $6.2 billion in 2003. In Canada, 161,500 Canadians paid $18.5 million for pager service in 2013. Telus Communications, one of the three major mobile carriers, announced the end to its Canadian pager service as of 31 March 2015, but rivals Bell, Rogers and PageNet intend to continue service.

In 2017 the UK National Health Service was thought to have been using over 10% of the remaining pagers in the world (130,000), with an annual cost of £6.6 million. Matt Hancock, (then) Secretary of State for Health and Social Care, announced in February 2019 that the 130,000 pagers still in use were to be phased out. NHSX announced plans in May 2020 to replace pagers and bleepers with "more modern communication tools," accelerated by the pressure placed on the service by the COVID-19 pandemic in England. In August 2020, a new procurement framework for clinical communications was launched which was intended to phase out pagers by the end of 2021, replacing them with "dedicated clinical-facing communication and tasks management tools" from 25 approved suppliers. In 2026 it was reported that NHS Blood and Transplant and other trusts were still using pagers, and there had been data security breaches.

In Japan, more than ten million pagers were active in 1996. On 1 October 2019, Japan's last paging service provider shut down radio signals and terminated its service.

In Russia, the last paging provider closed in November 2021.

== Design ==
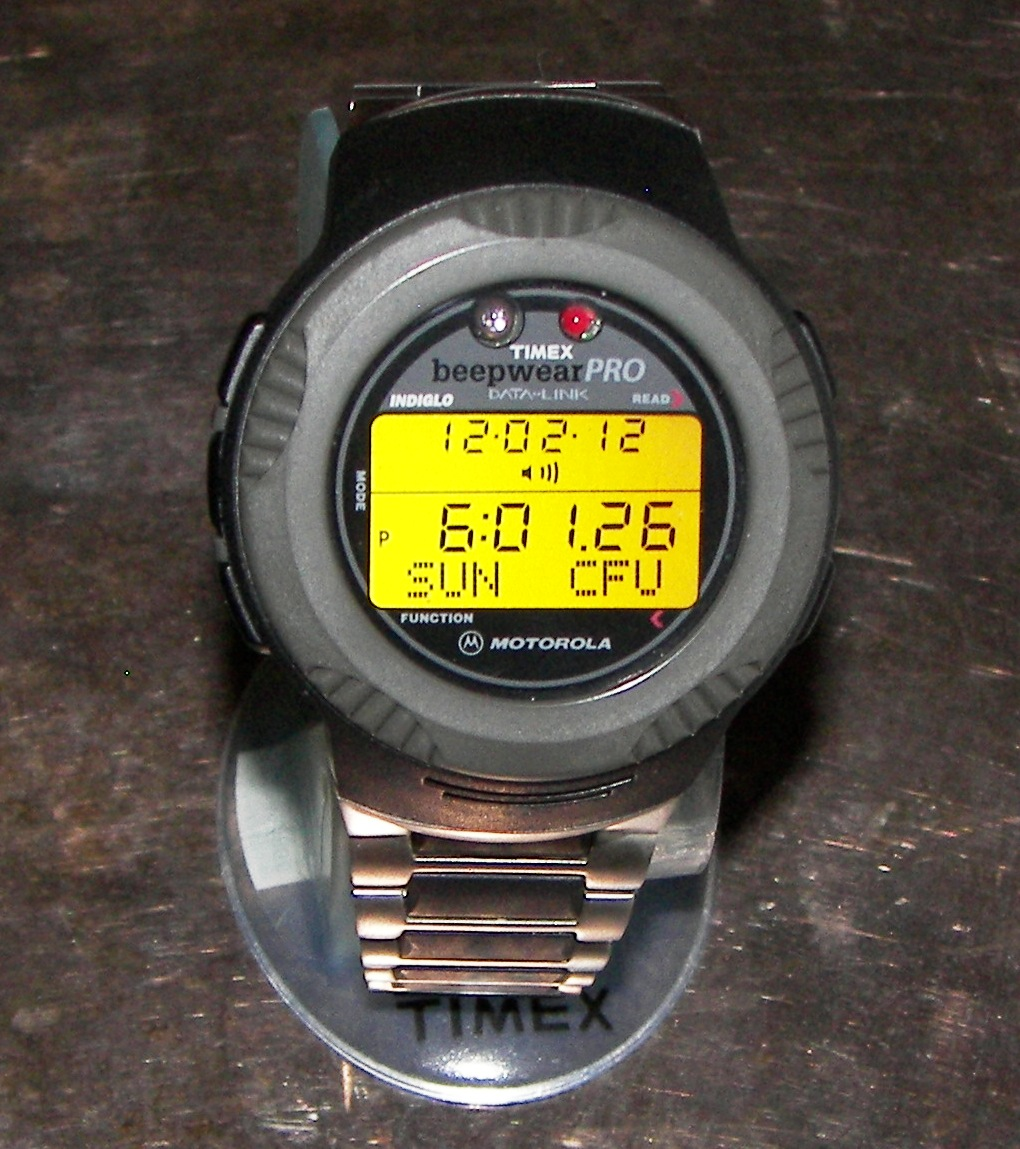
Timex Datalink Beepwear Pro: a wearable pager/watch featuring alphanumeric paging capability. Part of the Timex Datalink family of watches

Many paging network operators now allow numeric and textual pages to be submitted to the paging networks via email. A significant convenience for users given the widespread adoption of email, and commonalities in delivery assurances. This can result in pager messages being delayed or lost. Older forms of message submission using the Telelocator Alphanumeric Protocol involve modem connections directly to a paging network and are less subject to these delays. For this reason, older forms of message submission retain their usefulness for disseminating highly-important alerts to users such as emergency services personnel.

Common paging protocols include TAP, FLEX, ReFLEX, POCSAG, GOLAY, ERMES and NTT. Past paging protocols include Two-tone and 5/6-tone. In the United States, pagers typically receive signals using the FLEX protocol in the 900 MHz band. Commercial paging transmitters typically radiate 1000 watts of effective power, resulting in a much wider coverage area per tower than a mobile phone transmitter, which typically radiates around 0.6 watts per channel. Although 900 MHz FLEX paging networks tend to have stronger in-building coverage than mobile phone networks, commercial paging service providers will work with large institutions to install repeater equipment in the event that service is not available in needed areas of the subscribing institution's buildings. This is especially critical in hospital settings where emergency staff must be able to reliably receive pages to respond to patient needs.

Unlike mobile phones, most one-way pagers do not display any information about whether a signal is being received or about the strength of the received signal. Since one-way pagers do not contain transmitters, one-way paging networks have no way to track whether a message has been successfully delivered to a pager. Because of this, if a one-way pager is turned off or is not receiving a usable signal at the time a message is transmitted, the message will not be received and the sender of the message will not be notified of this fact. In the mid-1990s, some paging companies began offering a service, which allowed a customer to call their pager number and have numeric messages read back to them. This was useful for times when the pager was off or out of the coverage area, as it would know what pages were sent to the subscriber even if the subscriber never actually received the page. Other radio bands used for pagers include the 400 MHz band, the VHF band and the FM commercial broadcast band (88–108&MHz). Other paging protocols used in the VHF, 400 MHz UHF and 900 MHz bands include POCSAG and ERMES. In Canada and the United States, pagers that use the commercial FM band receive a subcarrier, called the Subsidiary Communications Authority, of a broadcast station. On-site paging systems in hospitals, unlike wide area paging systems, are local area services. Hospitals commonly use on-site paging for communication with staff and increasingly for contacting waiting patients when their appointment is due. These offer waiting patients the opportunity to leave the waiting area, but still be contacted.

== Operation ==
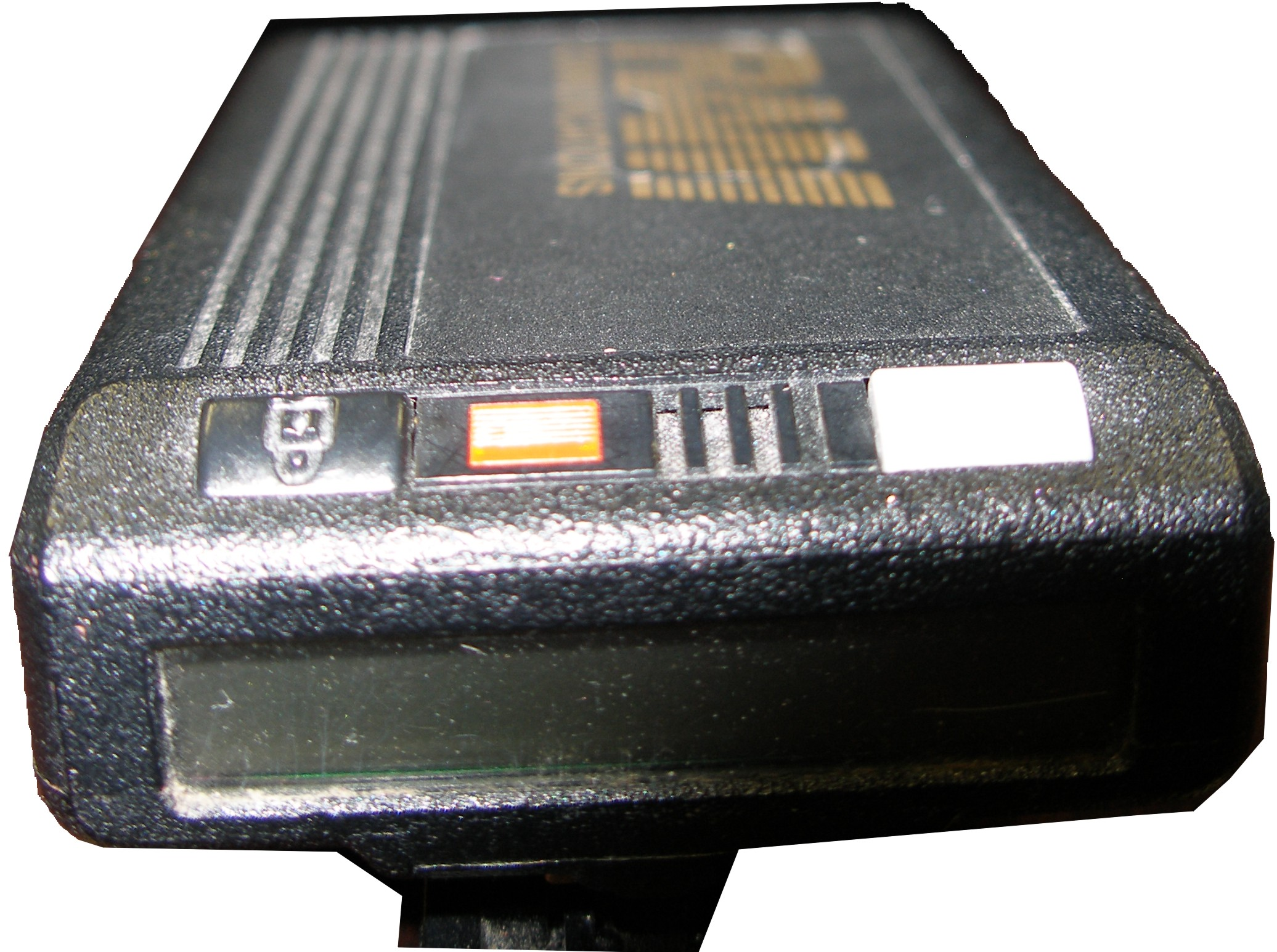
The top of a Motorola "Bravo" numeric pager

Paging systems are operated by commercial carriers, often as a subscription service and they are also operated directly by end users as private systems. Commercial carrier systems tend to cover a larger geographical area than private systems, while private systems tend to cover their limited area more thoroughly and deliver messages faster than commercial systems. In all systems, clients send messages to pagers, an activity commonly referred to as paging. System operators often assign unique phone numbers or email addresses to pagers (and pre-defined groups of pagers), enabling clients to page by telephone call, e-mail and SMS. Paging systems also support various types of direct connection protocols, which sacrifice global addressing and accessibility for a dedicated communications link. Automated monitoring and escalation software clients, often used in hospitals, IT departments and alarm companies, tend to prefer direct connections because of the increased reliability. Small paging systems, such as those used in restaurant and retail establishments, often integrate a keyboard and paging system into a single box, reducing both cost and complexity.

Paging systems support several popular direct connection protocols, including TAP, TNPP, SNPP and WCTP, as well as proprietary modem- and socket-based protocols. Additionally, organizations often integrate paging systems with their Voice-mail and PBX systems, conceptually attaching pagers to a telephone extension and set up web portals to integrate pagers into other parts of their enterprise. A paging system alerts a pager (or group of pagers) by transmitting information over an RF channel, including an address and message information. This information is formatted using a paging protocol, such as 2-tone, 5/6-tone, GOLAY, POCSAG, FLEX, ERMES, or NTT. Two-way pagers and response pagers typically use the ReFLEX protocol.

Modern paging systems typically use multiple base transmitters to modulate the same signal on the same RF channel, a design approach called simulcast. This type of design enables pagers to select the strongest signal from several candidate transmitters using FM capture, thereby improving overall system performance. Simulcast systems often use satellite to distribute identical information to multiple transmitters and GPS at each transmitter to precisely time its modulation relative to other transmitters. The coverage overlap, combined with use of satellite communications, can make paging systems more reliable than terrestrial based cellular networks in some cases, including during natural and human-made disaster. This resilience has led public safety agencies to adopt pagers over cellular and other commercial services for critical messaging.

== Categories ==
Pagers themselves vary from very cheap and simple beepers, to more complex personal communications equipment, falling into eight main categories.

Beepers or tone-only pagers
Beepers or tone-only pagers are the simplest and least expensive form of paging. They were named beepers because they originally made a beeping noise; however, current pagers in this category use other forms of alert as well. Some use audio signals, others light up and some vibrate, often used in combination. The majority of restaurant pagers fall into this category.
Voice/tone
Voice/Tone pagers enable pager users to listen to a recorded voice message when an alert is received.
Numeric
Numeric pagers contain a numeric LCD capable of displaying the calling phone number or other numeric information generally up to 10 digits. The display can also convey pager codes, a set of number codes corresponding to mutually understood pre-defined messages.
Alphanumeric
Alphanumeric pagers contain a more sophisticated LCD capable of displaying text and icons. These devices receive text messages, often through email or direct connection to the paging system. The sender must enter a message, either numeric and push # or, text & push # or a verbal message. The pager does not automatically record the sender's number; the pager will beep but no message can be seen or heard if none has been entered.
Response
Response pagers are alphanumeric pagers equipped with built-in transmitters, with the ability to acknowledge/confirm messages. They also allow the user to reply to messages by way of a multiple-choice response list, and to initiate "canned" messages from pre-programmed address and message lists. These devices are sometimes called "1.5-way pagers" or "1.7-way pagers" depending on capabilities.
Two-way
Two-way pagers are response pagers with built-in QWERTY keyboards. These pagers allow the user to reply to messages, originate messages and forward messages using free-form text as well as "canned" responses. Two-way pagers eventually give rise to the modern text messaging and instant messaging.
One-way modems
One-way modems are controllers with integrated paging receivers, which are capable of taking local action based on messages and data they receive.
Two-way modems
Two-way modems have capabilities similar to one-way modems. They can also confirm messages and transmit their own messages and data.

== Security ==
Pagers have certain privacy advantages and disadvantages compared with cellular phones. Since a one-way pager is a passive receiver only (it sends no information back to the base station), its location cannot be tracked. However, this can also be disadvantageous, as a message sent to a pager must be broadcast from every paging transmitter in the pager's service area. Thus, if a pager has nationwide service, a message sent to it could be intercepted by anyone anywhere within the nationwide service area.

=== Infiltration attack ===
On September 17, 2024, a massive attack against Hezbollah members in Lebanon and Syria was committed by Israel, who simultaneously detonated pagers that they were using. Lebanese Health authorities confirmed 42 deaths and over 3,000 injuries as a result of the explosions. In February 2024, Hezbollah leader Hassan Nasrallah had told the group's members to use pagers instead of cell phones, claiming that Israel had infiltrated their mobile phone network.

== In popular culture ==
As is the case with many new technologies, the functionality of the pager shifted from necessary professional use to a social tool integrated in one's personal life. During the rise of the pager, it became the subject of various forms of media, most notably in the 1990s hip-hop scene. Popular artists from the era, including Ice Cube, Method Man, and A Tribe Called Quest, began referencing newly developed mobile technologies such as the pager. A Tribe Called Quest's single "Skypager" directly speaks of the importance of such a wireless communication device, with group member Q-Tip stating that the Skypager "serves an important communicative function for a young professional with a full calendar". Three 6 Mafia's "2-Way Freak," Sir Mix-A-Lot's "Beepers" and "Bug a Boo" from Destiny's Child also make reference to pagers.

Illicit drug dealers used pagers to great effect during the 1990s to conduct commerce, using them to arrange meetings with buyers. Associate superintendent for Miami-Dade County Public Schools in Florida Gul James Fleming once called them "the most dominant symbol of the drug trade" and schools have previously forbidden students from carrying them because of the ease with which they could be "used to arrange illegal drug sales." Some local governments moved to restrict or ban pagers from being used in schools, though many of these laws were later repealed.

In season one of the TV show The Wire, the drug dealing crew of Avon Barksdale uses pagers to exchange coded messages and coordinate their activities.

== See also ==
- Minitor
- Mobile phone
- Plectron
- Simple Network Paging Protocol
- Text messaging
- Instant messaging
- Wireless Communications Transfer Protocol
