= RAF Shipton =

Former Royal Air Force base in Yorkshire, England

RAF Shipton
- Shipton-by-Beningbrough, North Yorkshire in England
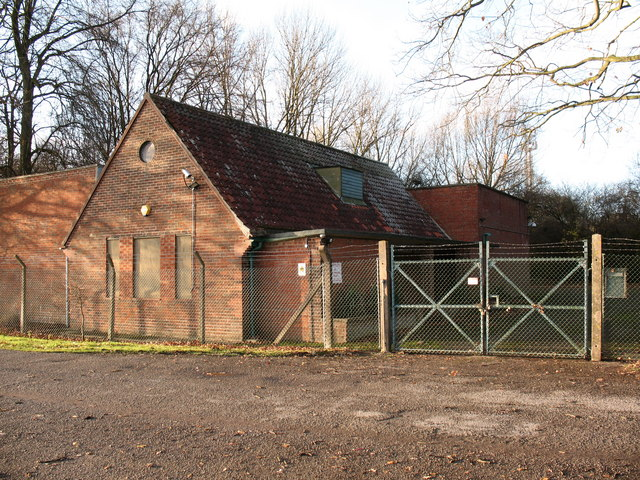
- The bunker at Shipton

Site information
- Type: Royal Air Force station
- Operator: Royal Air Force
- Controlled by: RAF Fighter Command

Location
- Shown within North Yorkshire RAF Shipton (the United Kingdom)
- Coordinates: 54.0485°N 1.1721°W

Site history
- Built: 1918
- In use: September 1918 - 1993
- Battles/wars: European theatre of World War II; Cold War

Airfield information
- Elevation: 14 metres (46 ft) AMSL

Royal Air Force Shipton (more commonly known as RAF Shipton) was a First World War era airfield located north of the village of Shipton-by-Beningbrough, in North Yorkshire, England. During the First World War, it was used by No. 76 Squadron RAF whose remit was to provide Home Defence (HD).

The site was utilised by the RAF in the Second World War as a base for No. 60 Maintenance Unit and in the Cold War as a fighter control site for No. 12 Group RAF, and command bunker in case of a nuclear event. The bunker site buildings are still extant, though they were sold into private hands in the 1990s.

== History ==
=== First World War ===
RAF Shipton was brought into use in September 1916 as a landing site for No. 76 (Home Defence) Squadron, RAF. The site is 4 miles (6.4 km) south east of RAF Linton-on-Ouse, 5 miles (8 km) north of York, and 1.9 miles (3 km) north of Shipton by Beningbrough village. No. 76 Squadron had their headquarters at Ripon and like many other of the relief landing grounds they operated, it is unsure whether or not Shipton saw any flying activity. After the Armistice, the RAF disposed of the site in March 1919.

=== Second World War ===
It was resurrected in the Second World War as a base for No. 60 Maintenance Unit (originally No. 5 Salvage Unit) who were required to strip everything of scrap value down for components that could be used. They had a remit to recover crashed aircraft as part of their recovery process, and for a while, the guard hut at Shipton was the upturned fuselage of a wrecked aircraft. The area of responsibility that No. 60 MU covered included the North York Moors, the Peak District, and as far north as Blyth in Northumberland when they went to recover a crashed Luftwaffe aircraft from the harbour area. No. 60 MU recovered a crashed Handley Page Halifax from Whernside which was scattered over a wide area. The crash occurred in December 1943 and the extreme cold and elevated location made the recovery very difficult, but all valuable parts were returned to the main site at Shipton by 6 January 1944. During this time, Shipton was used as a scatter airfield (Note: A Scatter Airfield was an early Second World War system where large amounts of aircraft were flown to airfields away from their primary squadron home airbase so that if one of the locations was attacked, the aircraft losses would be minimised. It was assumed that intelligence gathered by the enemy would know the locations of individual squadrons and so many locations used their scatter, or satellite landing grounds to disperse their aircraft.) for the Armstrong Whitworth Whitley Bombers of No. 58 Squadron from nearby Linton-on-Ouse. The Whitleys were taken there to spread out the number of aircraft across a wider geographical area in case of an enemy raid at Linton.

In 1946, No. 60 MU withdrew from the site and moved to RAF Rufforth, although there is possible evidence that they had a small operation still ongoing at Shipton until 1959, when the headquarters was confirmed as being at RAF Church Fenton.

=== Cold War ===
As part of Britains' early warning defence programme (known as ROTOR), a bunker with three levels was built at the north west corner of the airfield site in 1953. Initially, the operations were run from Imphal Barracks in York, but when the bunker was commissioned in 1954, the control was transferred to Shipton. Shipton was one of six Sector Operations Centres (SOCs) dotted around Great Britain, (the other five being at Barnton Quarry in Edinburgh, Bawburgh near Norwich, Box in Wiltshire, Goosnargh near Preston and Kelvedon Hatch in Essex).

The initial role of the SOC was to direct air operations and counter-inception flights in the eastern side of England. Reports were fed into the site from radar stations dotted along the eastern coast of England. As befitting its air defence role, it was the headquarters of the northern sector (No. 12 Group Fighter Command) and was in overall command of 19, 66, 92, 152, 264, 275, 607, 608 and 609 Squadrons spread out between the airfields at Church Fenton, Linton-on-Ouse, Ouston and Thornaby. During this period, some of the staff were drawn from the West Riding numbered Fighter Control Unit, No. 3609 Squadron.

The site itself consisted of the main bunker complex, a guardhouse and a standby living accommodation, though the main living quarters were at the nearby base of RAF Linton-on-Ouse. The site was only the lead SOC for three years before the centre at RAF Boulmer assumed primacy in 1957. During the 1970s, 80s and 90s, the bunker was a regional seat of government (RSG), which later changed to the designation of Regional Government Headquarters (RGHQ). A fourth floor was added in 1976 as part of a five-year refurbishment programme.

A decision was taken in 1992 to sell off some of the nuclear bunkers deemed unnecessary after the end of the Cold War; Shipton was one of them, with closure coming in 1993 and disposal in 1996.
