= Barnton Quarry =

Disused stone quarry in Edinburgh, Scotland

Coordinates: 55°57′35″N 3°16′40″W

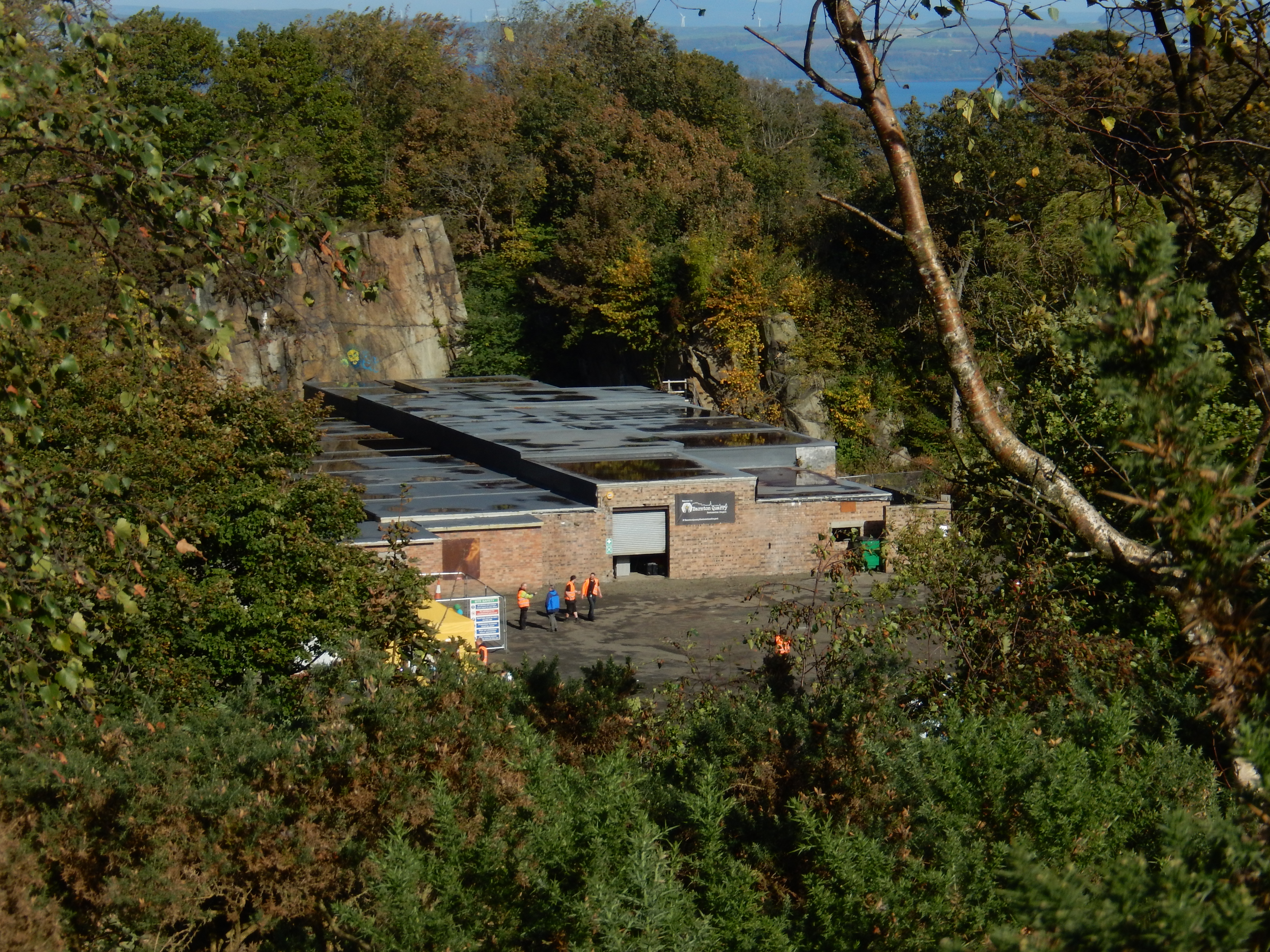
Barnton Quarry and Bunker from Corstorphine Hill

Barnton Quarry is a disused stone quarry in Corstorphine Hill, Clermiston, Edinburgh, Scotland. The site was later used as a military command centre, and is now being converted into a museum.

Stone was extracted from the quarry until 1914. During the Second World War, the Royal Air Force (RAF) built a Fighter Command operations room in the quarry. In 1952, during the Cold War, this facility was expanded into a central coordination facility for radar stations throughout Scotland. The military authorities closed the site and in 1983 and transferred ownership to the local council.

The site was subsequently vandalised and damaged by fire. The site is now being cleaned and restored with the goal of creating a local Cold War museum and education centre. The project is being undertaken by volunteers, with funding from the owners of Scotland's Secret Bunker, a disused bunker near Anstruther which is now run as a tourist attraction.

== History ==
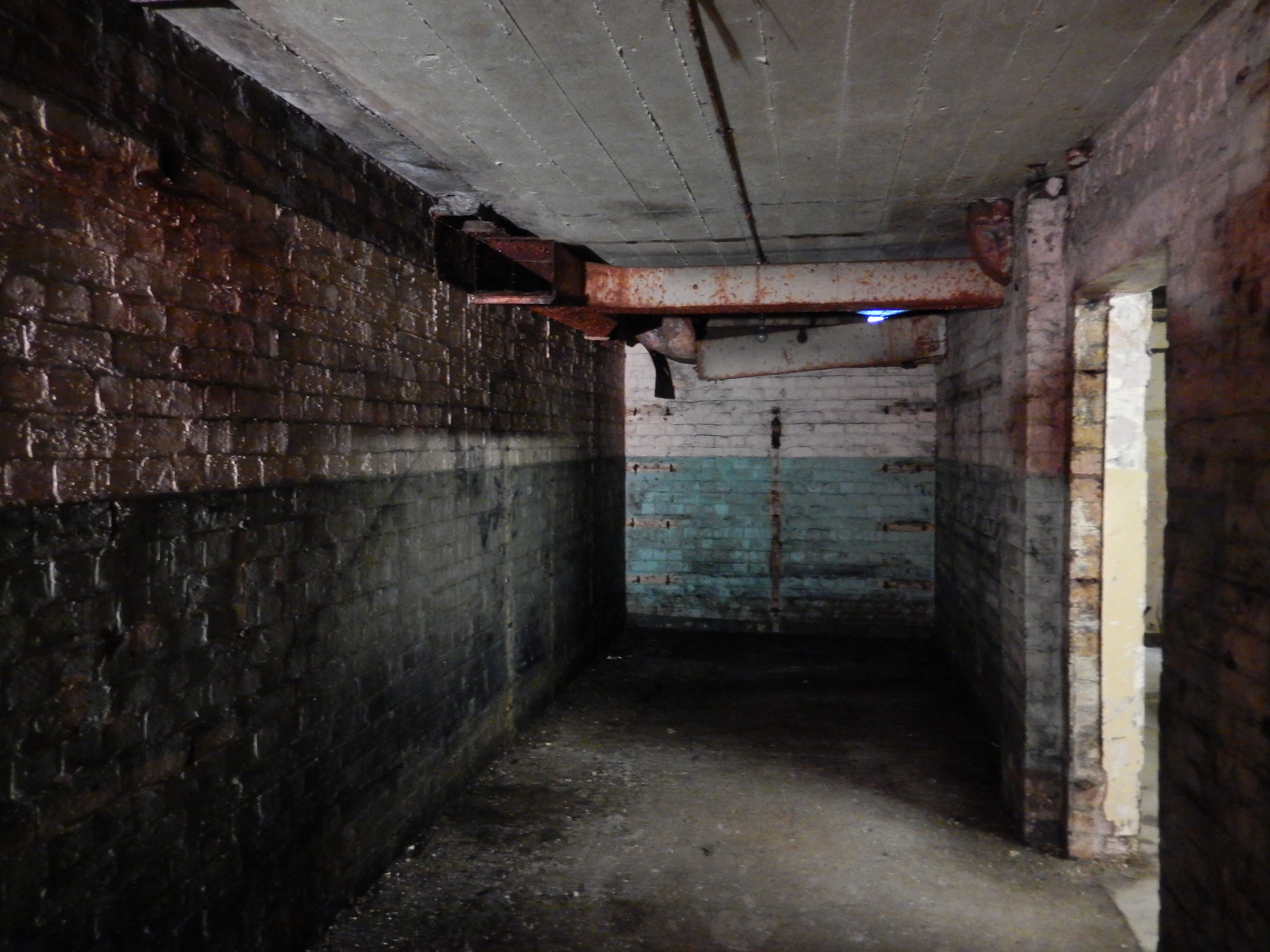
Inside Barnton Quarry Bunker during restoration in 2018

Barnton Quarry produced stone until 1914, then in 1942 was used as an RAF fighter command operations room.

A bunker was built in 1952 as the SOC (Sector Operations Centre) for correlating information from ROTOR radar stations throughout Scotland. The bunker comprises three underground levels and a large surface building which predates the underground structure.

The site was re-designated as a regional seat of government in the early 1960s. The bunker was kept ready to accommodate 400 politicians and civil servants for up to 30 days. It remained operational until the early 1980s. Ownership was transferred to Lothian Regional Council in 1983. In the late 1980s, MacGregor Properties bought the site but failed to get planning permission to develop it.

The underground structure was damaged by fire in August 1991 and again in May 1993.

In 1996, the site was purchased by James Mitchell, owner of Scotland's Secret Bunker. Since 2011, a team of volunteers has helped with renovation efforts. The aim is to create a museum and education centre with a view to restoring the R4 bunker to the original 1952 configuration.

In June 2021, Historic Environment Scotland designated the site as Category-A listed.

== See also ==
- Kelvedon Hatch Secret Nuclear Bunker
- RAF Shipton
