= Secret Nuclear Bunker =

Secret Nuclear Bunker may refer to:

- Hack Green Secret Nuclear Bunker, a former government nuclear bunker in Cheshire, England
- Kelvedon Hatch Secret Nuclear Bunker, a former government nuclear bunker in Essex, England
