= Skendleby =

Village in Lincolnshire, England

Coordinates: 53.204521°N 0.145296°E

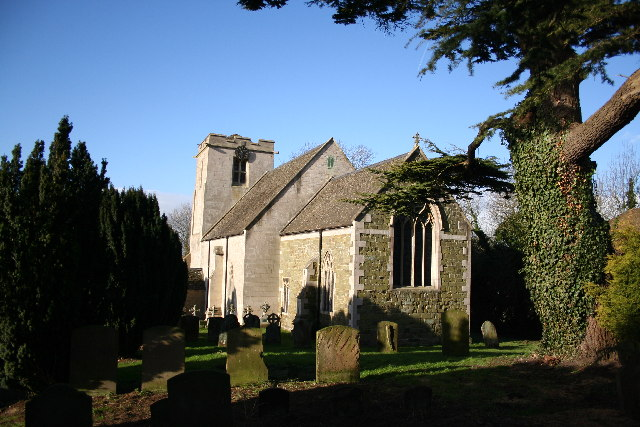
- Church of St Peter and St Paul, Skendleby

- Location within Lincolnshire
- Population: 174 (2011)
- OS grid reference: TF433696
  - London: 120 mi (190 km) S
- District: East Lindsey
- Shire county: Lincolnshire
- Region: East Midlands
- Country: England
- Sovereign state: United Kingdom
- Post town: Spilsby
- Postcode district: PE23
- Police: Lincolnshire
- Fire: Lincolnshire
- Ambulance: East Midlands
- UK Parliament: Louth and Horncastle

Skendleby is a small village and civil parish in the East Lindsey district of Lincolnshire, England. It is situated near to the A158 and lies 35 miles (56 km) east from the county town Lincoln, and about 4 miles (6 km) north-east from the town of Spilsby. The village stands near the south-eastern edge of the Lincolnshire Wolds.

== History ==
A chalk long barrow, Giants Hill, was built here for seven adults and a child, whose remains were found on chalk slabs at the south-east edge of the site.

Skendleby is mentioned in the 1086 Domesday Book as having a church and 36 households, with Lord of the manor being Gilbert de Gant. In the reign of Elizabeth I Skendleby was recorded as having 27 households.

The believed remains of St James Chapel, Skendleby Priory, were uncovered during archaeological investigations and excavations in 2005. It was a small cell to Bardney Abbey built by Walter de Gant in the 12th century. It is possible that an earlier Saxon monastery may also be near the site of the cell, Bede having mentioned a monastery 'near Partney', in the 7th century. Bardney Abbey was founded no later than 697, but fell into decline, during the 9th century. It is reputed to have been destroyed by a Danish raid in 869, but this is unlikely.

Bardney Abbey was refounded by Gilbert de Gant who re-dedicated it to Saint Peter and Saint Paul. A St Peter's church at Skendleby was given to the monks of Bardney by Gilbert De Gant, sometime prior to 1094. The present Grade II listed church of St Peter and St Paul dates from the 13th and 14th centuries, and was restored in 1875 by George Gilbert Scott.

Skendleby Hall dates from the mid-18th century with some later alterations and additions. It is Grade II listed.

=== Historical demography ===
The village has never had a large population, peaking in the mid-19th century and falling to around 160 residents by 2001.

Population of Skendleby Civil Parish
Year	1801	1811	1821	1831	1841	1851	1881	1891	1901	1911	1921	1931	1951	1961
Population	174	234	210	253	289	326	270	258	232	204	211	208	173	164

== Community ==
Skendleby public house is the Blacksmith's Arms. A Translinc bus service runs through the village daily.

Skendleby National School opened in 1844, and later became Skendleby Church of England School. The school closed on 18 July 1969, after which most village children attended school in the neighbouring village of Partney.

== RAF Skendleby ==
One mile north-east of Skendleby was the location of RAF Skendleby Chain Home Low radar station, with a 200-foot (61 m) wooden mast on the top of a nearby manmade hillock, that operated during the Second World War between 1941 and 1945. In 1950 the site was developed further by the RAF with the addition of a two-storey underground facility excavated to house a ROTOR ground control intercept station that operated during the Cold War.

The RAF handed over the site during the late 1960s and it became a civil defence regional headquarters that controlled Lincolnshire, Nottinghamshire and Derbyshire. Redesignated as Regional Government HQ 3.1 in the 1980s and with an additional two underground floors added, the only above ground structures are four ventilators on the mound together with a radio mast. A small building, disguised as a bungalow, conceals the heavy blast doors and stairs down to the nuclear proof bunker. The site was sold in 2000 and the whole facility is now in private ownership and believed to be used for secure storage.
