= Spies for Peace =

British anti-war activist group

Spies for Peace was a British group of anti-war activists associated with the Committee of 100 who publicised government preparations for rule after a nuclear war. In 1963 they broke into a secret government bunker, regional seat of government number 6 (RSG-6) at Warren Row, near Reading, where they photographed and copied documents. The RSGs were to include representatives of all the central government departments, to maintain law and order, communicate with the surviving population and control remaining resources. The public were virtually unaware what the government was planning for the aftermath of a nuclear war until it was revealed by Spies for Peace.

They published this information in a pamphlet, Danger! Official Secret RSG-6. Four thousand copies were sent to the national press, politicians and peace movement activists and copies were distributed on the Campaign for Nuclear Disarmament's Easter march from Aldermaston.

The pamphlet said it was "about a small group of people who have accepted thermonuclear war as a probability, and are consciously and carefully planning for it. ... They are quietly waiting for the day the bomb drops, for that will be the day they take over." It listed the RSGs and gave their telephone numbers. Most of the pamphlet was about RSG-6, which Spies for Peace described in detail. They said that "RSG-6 is not a centre for civil defence. It is a centre for military government", and they listed the personnel who were to staff it. The pamphlet described emergency planning exercises in which RSG-6 had been activated, including a NATO exercise in September 1962, FALLEX-62. Spies for Peace asserted that the exercise demonstrated the incapacity of the public services to cope with the consequences of nuclear attack and that the RSG system would not work. The exercise, they said, "proved once and for all the truth of the 1957 Defence White Paper that there is no defence against nuclear war." In a possible hint at the source of their information, Spies for Peace said that FALLEX-62 "convinced at least one occupant of one RSG at least that the deterrent is quite futile". The pamphlet claimed that at the time of the Cuban Missile Crisis, a month after the NATO exercise, RSG-6 was not activated.

The authors objected strongly to the fact that the RSG network had not been publicly debated, that its staff were unelected and that they would have military powers.

The 1963 Aldermaston issue of the CND bulletin Sanity included the Spies for Peace revelations and several hundred demonstrators left the Aldermaston route and headed for RSG-6 where they set up a picket. Spies for Peace made front-page news but the press was later advised by an official "D-Notice" from saying any more about the matter. The police tried to prevent any further distribution of the information but failed to do so. RSGs in Cambridge and Edinburgh were also picketed.

Although several people were arrested, the original spies were not identified or caught. After Nicolas Walter died, it was revealed in 2002 by his daughter Natasha Walter that her father was one of the Spies for Peace. It was revealed in 2013 with her consent, again by their daughter, that Ruth, Walter's wife, was also a member of the group. Nic Ralph made public his role in the Spies for Peace in 2023.

Obituaries for Mike Lesser and Ken Weller also revealed their involvement in Spies For Peace.

== See also ==
- Anti-nuclear movement in the United Kingdom
- List of anti-war organizations
- List of peace activists
- Spiegel affair of 1962, also related to the NATO exercise "Fallex 62"
