= Regional seat of government =

Cold War civil defence bunker network

Regional seats of government or RSGs were the best known aspect of Britain's civil defence preparations against nuclear war. In fact, however, naming conventions changed over the years as strategies in Whitehall changed.

In the aftermath of the nuclear attack on Hiroshima and the Soviet Union's development of nuclear weapons, it was clear that London could not survive a nuclear bombardment. Although considerable effort still went into secret construction of military citadels under London, the solution was to disperse the machinery of government into small pieces in the provinces, where there would be a greater chance of survival.

Experiments along these lines had taken place during the Second World War, when a system of regional commissioners existed and key departments were moved out of London to Bath, Harrogate and Cheltenham, among others. However, the idea of a regional commissioner dated back to the First World War and the 1926 general strike.

== From the Second World War to the H-bomb ==
The Civil Defence Corps was revived by the Civil Defence Act 1948 (12, 13 & 14 Geo. 6. c. 5) and the next year it was decided to construct a network of two-storey, hardened war rooms built on government sites and with concrete walls ranging from five to seven feet thick.

Construction started in 1953 and was completed by 1965. The sites chosen were

- Region 1 (Northern)
  - Kenton Bar in Newcastle upon Tyne, a former RAF operations room dating from 1940 (55°0′1″N 1°39′48″W)
- Region 2 (North East)
  - Lawnswood, Leeds (53°50′52″N 1°35′28″W)
- Region 3 (North Midlands)
  - Chalfont Drive, Nottingham (52°57′47″N 1°11′54″W)
- Region 4 (Eastern)
  - Brooklands Avenue, Cambridge (52°11′16″N 0°7′40″E)
- Region 5 (London)
  - Five sub-controls in the outer suburbs were established – see Civil defence centres in London
- Region 6 (Southern)
  - University of Reading Whiteknights Campus, Reading (51°26′20″N 0°56′4″W)
- Region 7 (South West)
  - Flowers Hill, Bristol (51°25′38″N 2°32′39″W)
- Region 8 (Wales)
  - Coryton, Cardiff (51°31′24″N 3°14′21″W)
- Region 9 (West Midlands)
  - Shirley, Birmingham (52°24′15″N 1°49′14″W)
- Region 10 (Scotland)
  - Kirknewton, near Edinburgh (55°54′0″N 3°26′15″W)
- Region 11 (South East)
  - Tunbridge Wells (51°7′35″N 0°16′45″E)

== The H-bomb era ==
The development of the increased destructive power of the hydrogen bomb made these earlier arrangements anachronistic. Instead of a long war, planners now expected a short devastating attack on major cities. The war rooms were built too close to major population centres, and with a staff of only 45, were insufficient for the dispersed network that civil defence planners then thought would be required.

It was then expected that central government might itself cease to exist, and control would pass entirely into the hands of a regional commissioner, of cabinet rank, who would wield absolute power in his region. His staff would replicate all parts of central government.

In tune with this philosophy of dispersal, work continued to refurbish and expand a former underground aircraft factory and ammunition store at Hawthorn, Wiltshire, built in a vast complex of former Bath stone quarries near Bath, in order to create the Central Government War Headquarters, a final emergency national seat of government.

In 1956 the Home Office issued a specification for a vastly expanded network of bunkers with space for 300 staff, capable of resisting a near miss, linked into communications systems such as the BBC, and capable of operating for several months.

However, in the following year Britain was hit by one of the recurrent economic crises which marked the 1950s and 1960s, and the plans had to be scaled back. In particular, the new RSGs were, wherever possible, to use existing facilities, with none in the end being purpose-built. This spirit of economy was to mark all UK preparations for nuclear war. They were completed between 1958 and 1961, and the construction was done in complete secrecy, with Parliament, as well as the public and the press, unaware of the work being carried out.

== RSGs ==
The regional seats of government were;

- Region 1 (Northern)
  - Gaza Barracks, Catterick Camp. This did not provide protected accommodation, and the Home Office intention was to build a new protected headquarters at Hexham, Northumberland.
- Region 2 (North East)
  - Imphal Barracks, York. As with Catterick, this was a temporary expedient, and the intention was to move into an expanded ex-ROTOR bunker at Shipton, a few miles north of the city.
- Region 3 (North Midlands)
  - Plans for a new site at Grantham were abandoned, as new assumptions about Soviet targeting strategy assumed that Nottingham would avoid heavy fallout, and so to save money the old War Room there was expanded to serve as the RSG.
- Region 4 (Eastern)
  - The existing War Room at Cambridge was expanded to serve as the RSG.
- Region 5 (London)
  - The five London War Rooms were retained.
- Region 6 (Southern)
  - Warren Row, between Henley-on-Thames and Maidenhead, an underground aircraft components factory which dated from the Second World War and provided limited accommodation. Conditions here were primitive and unsatisfactory, and the Home Office proposed to build a new RSG in the Oxford/Reading area, with a site at Wallingford finally being decided upon.
- Region 7 (South West)
  - Bolt Head, near Salcombe in south Devon. This was a former protected radar station, one of dozens built by the RAF under the ROTOR Plan, only to find that the pace of military development – in particular the development of new radar technologies and replacement of crewed aircraft by guided missiles – was faster than construction, so making this type of bunker redundant. Bolt Head was considered to be too remote to serve its region adequately, and so the plan was to build a new RSG at Norton Manor army camp, near Taunton.
- Region 8 (Wales)
  - The Barracks, Brecon. This was also a temporary expedient and the proposal was to build a new RSG at Llandrindod Wells.
- Region 9 (West Midlands)
  - The Drakelow Tunnels, near Kidderminster. Another underground factory from the World War II era, built to handle dispersed aircraft engine production by the Rover company.
- Region 10 (North West)
  - Fulwood Barracks, Preston. As at Catterick, there was no protected accommodation here and so the Home Office proposed to build a new RSG at Lancaster.
- Region 11 (Northern Ireland)
  - Regional War Room, Mount Eden Park, Belfast.

Another former ROTOR station, Barnton Quarry in the western outskirts of Edinburgh, became the Scottish National HQ, with three subsidiary bunkers: North Zone at Anstruther in Fife, another former ROTOR station; East Zone using the former war room at Kirknewton; and West Zone taking over a former anti-aircraft control station at East Kilbride.

The existence of the entire network was blown open in 1963, when a small group called Spies for Peace, acting on a tip-off, broke into RSG6 at Warren Row and – anonymously – produced a pamphlet exposing the network, Danger! Official Secret. The Spies For Peace were never caught and the result was a political scandal.

The RSGs entered public consciousness: evidently, the government was spending large amounts of taxpayers' money to protect itself while doing nothing for the mass of the population who faced annihilation in a nuclear war. Investigations by other journalists uncovered and published the sites of most of the other bunkers in the network, and despite this being technically illegal, none were prosecuted.

=== Sub-regions ===
Below the RSGs would be another series of bunkers called Sub-Regional Controls, with several per civil defence region. By 1962 the Home Office wanted 29 of these, a costly increase from the 19 originally planned. Use of the following extant buildings was proposed:

- Region 2 (North East) – SRC 2.2 would be a former anti-aircraft control bunker at Conisborough near Doncaster
- Region 3 (North Midlands) – 3.1 would be another former anti-aircraft bunker at Elvaston near Derby. 3.2 would be a former ROTOR bunker at Skendleby, in a remote area of rural Lincolnshire
- Region 4 (Eastern) – 4.2 a new SRC built under Sovereign House, a government office block in Hertford
- Region 5 (London) – the London region had several SRCs, including 5.1 at Kelvedon Hatch in Essex, a deeply buried former ROTOR bunker, 5.2 at Fort Bridgewood, Chatham, and 5.5, at Stoughton Barracks, Guildford
- Region 6 (Southern) – the Warren Row bunker would have become an SRC if the new RSG had been built as planned. The other SRC was in the basement of the civil service commission headquarters at Basingstoke.
- Region 7 (South West) – SRC 7.1 was planned to use the former Wiltshire Police HQ at Devizes
- Region 8 (Wales) – SRC 8.1 was in a former ammunition store at Brackla Hill near Bridgend. Home Office planners wanted three civil defence regions in Wales rather than the original two, so 8.3 was planned to be at St Twynnels, another former ROTOR bunker.
- Region 9 (West Midlands) – 9.1 was in another former ammunition store at Swynnerton, and 9.2 at Norton Barracks, Worcester
- Region 10 – 10.1 was in the basement of government buildings at Southport

=== Outcome ===
Plans on this scale proved over-ambitious, and some of these SRCs (Devizes, Elvaston, Worcester) never had protected accommodation built. Soon after becoming prime minister in 1964, Harold Wilson vetoed the building the new RSGs which the Home Office wanted and for which detailed estimates existed. By this time, the structure of civil defence was changing again, as the government realised that a more flexible system of protected sub-regional controls was needed in order to revive a link between central government and local authorities who would bear the brunt of post-attack planning. Regional seats of government would not now be hardened structures and would be established as soon as possible after attack, under prearranged plans at locations that would be selected in the light of circumstances.

More ex-ROTOR stations were pressed into service, and existing RSGs and SRCs were combined to form a new network. A handful of reinforced basements were built under government office blocks to serve as SRCs. However, financial constraints meant that this plan was never fully carried out and the complete network of SRCs was never built.

== After the Civil Defence Corps ==
By the time that the Civil Defence Corps was run down in 1968, following another economic crisis, the network was as follows:

- Region 1 (Northern)
  - Hexham in the Border Country, using a former hardened cold store from the Second World War rather than the purpose-built structure the Home Office originally wanted
- Region 2 (North East)
  - Bempton, a former ROTOR bunker on the Yorkshire coast
  - Conisbrough near Doncaster, a former anti-aircraft operations bunker
- Region 3 (North Midlands)
  - Skendleby
  - Loughborough, a former hardened cold store
- Region 4 (Eastern)
  - Bawburgh outside Norwich, a former ROTOR bunker
  - Hertford
- Region 5 (London)
  - Kelvedon Hatch, near Brentwood in Essex, a deeply buried former ROTOR bunker
- Region 6 (Southern)
  - Basingstoke, a protected basement built under the HQ of the Civil Service Commission
  - Dover Castle (protected accommodation dated back to the Napoleonic Wars, but a large citadel was built here for naval operations during the Second World War)
  - Stoughton Barracks, Guildford
- Region 7 (South West)
  - The Bolt Head/Hope Cove RSG near Salcombe, Devon
  - Ullenwood, a former anti-aircraft control on a hilltop site near Cheltenham Spa
- Region 8 (Wales)
  - A former ammunitions storage bunker at Brackla Hill, Bridgend
  - Sites for a North Wales SRC were considered at Llandudno Junction as well as a protected basement under Government buildings at Ruthin, but neither came to fruition
- Region 9 (West Midlands)
  - The Drakelow RSG and the former SRC at Swynnerton, Staffordshire
- Region 10 (North West)
  - There was little existing protected accommodation in the northwest and so a new SRC was built under a technical college at Southport
- Region 11 (Northern Ireland)
  - Regional War Room, Mount Eden Park, Belfast

The situation in Scotland remained the same. By the 1970s, the risk of war had receded dramatically, and Britain had been forced to devalue the pound, so this network was reduced to a care-and-maintenance basis only. There was no new construction and no renovation of surplus military accommodation. Investment in communications was almost negligible, and in the event of a nuclear war, the infrastructure would have been largely useless.

The coming to power of Margaret Thatcher in 1979 led to the last hurrah of UK civil defence. A review in 1980 called for the network to be recast as Regional Government Headquarters (RGHQ), which would be equipped with up-to-date communications and either based on the existing SRCs or housed in completely new accommodation. The programme was slow to start however, and three new sites, carried on again in complete secrecy, were not completed until the 1980s with only a few years to go before the end of the Cold War made civil defence entirely redundant.

== Last phase of the Cold War ==
The final shape of secret dispersed regional government in the UK was:

- Region 1 (Scotland)
  - A purpose-built HQ was constructed on a military base at Cultybraggan Camp near Comrie in central Scotland.
- Region 2 (North East)
  - Hexham
- Region 3 (North Midlands)
  - Skendleby
  - Loughborough
- Region 4 (Eastern)
  - Bawburgh
  - Hertford
- Region 5 (London)
  - Kelvedon Hatch
- Region 6 (Southern)
  - Crowborough, Sussex (the Basingstoke site suffered from leaks). A bunker had been built here during the Second World War to house the Aspidistra transmitter, broadcasting to occupied Europe.
- Region 7 (South West)
  - The Bolt Head/Hope Cove RSG/SRC and a new bunker to replace Ullenwood (which was too small) at Chilmark near Salisbury (another bunker at Chilmark was used by the RAF to store nuclear warheads).
- Region 8 (Wales)
  - Brackla Hill, Bridgend and Wrexham, the latter being the former No 17 Group HQ Royal Observer Corps at Borras, Wrexham which had become redundant in September 1991 with the disbanding of the ROC.
- Region 9 (West Midlands)
  - Drakelow
  - Swynnerton
- Region 10 (North West)
  - Hack Green, a former ROTOR bunker near Nantwich, Cheshire.
  - Langley Lane at Goosnargh near Preston, a former Royal Observer Corps bunker dating back to the Second World War.
  - The Southport SRC had to be abandoned as it suffered from flooding.
- Region 11 (Northern Ireland)
  - Woodside Industrial Estate, Ballymena, County Antrim – a purpose-built two-storey semi-sunk protected bunker, declared operational 1989.

== After the Cold War ==
By 1992, the end of the Cold War, brought about by the collapse of the Soviet Union, meant this network was now a luxury. Faced with – again – the need for economy, the UK government began to run down the network. The bunkers were closed one by one and sold off to the private sector where buyers could be found.

Some, such as Warren Row, became protected storage facilities operated by security companies. Others – many of them contaminated by asbestos – were simply abandoned. Those at Hexham, Loughborough and Kirknewton were demolished. The Tunbridge Wells war room has also been demolished (taking three months to accomplish rather than the planned-for two weeks). Crowborough is used by Sussex Police for training, whilst Cultybraggan first returned to army use and is now owned by the local community in Comrie. A handful – Drakelow Tunnels, Kelvedon Hatch, Hack Green, Dover and Anstruther – became museums. The Region 6 War Room survives and was Grade II listed in 2009; the University of Reading utilises the building as a secure storage facility for the university library. The Grade II listed Cambridge bunker is now a store for the Museum of Archaeology and Anthropology, University of Cambridge.

== Gallery ==
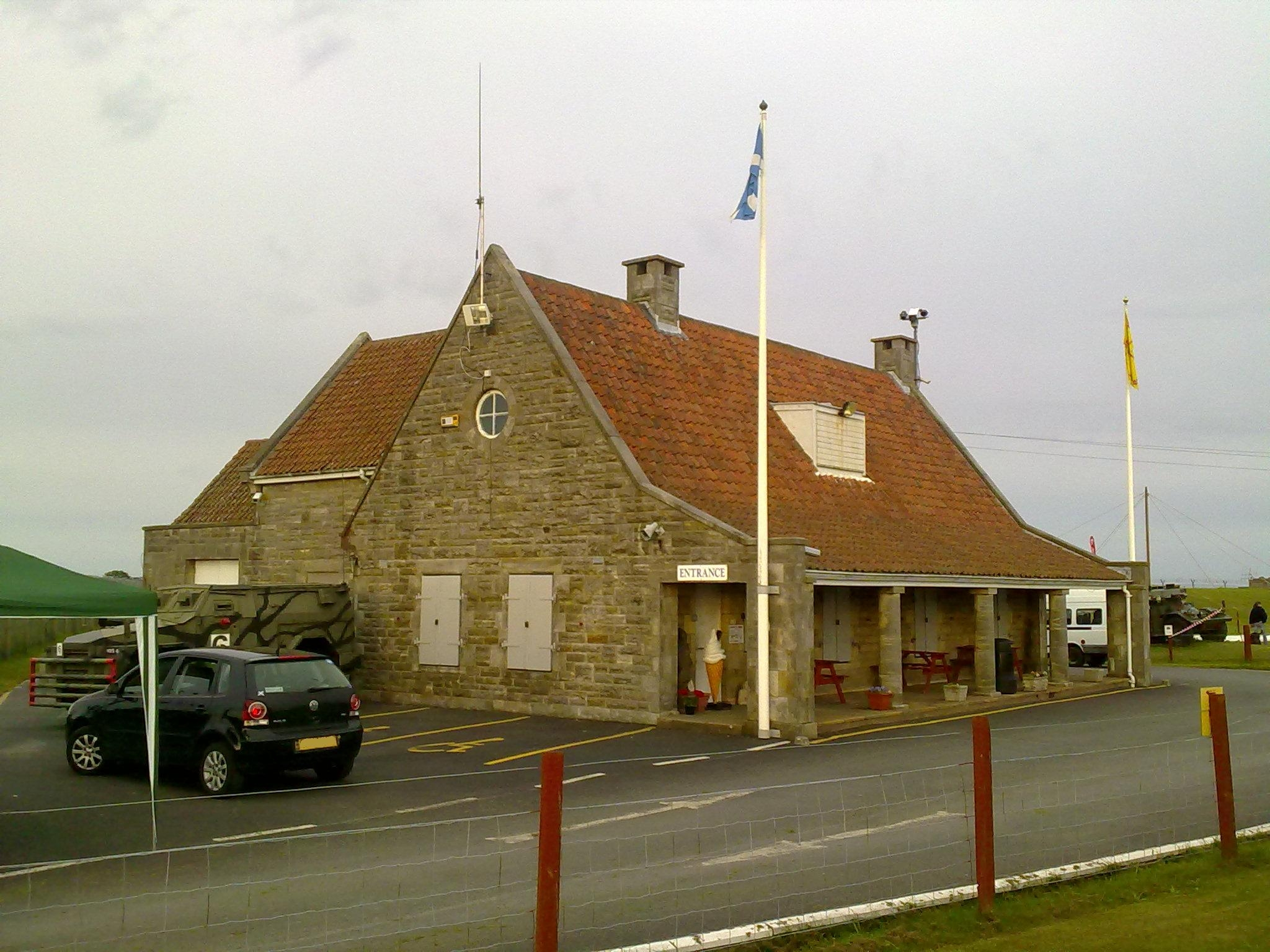
Surface building accessing the subsidiary bunker at Anstruther

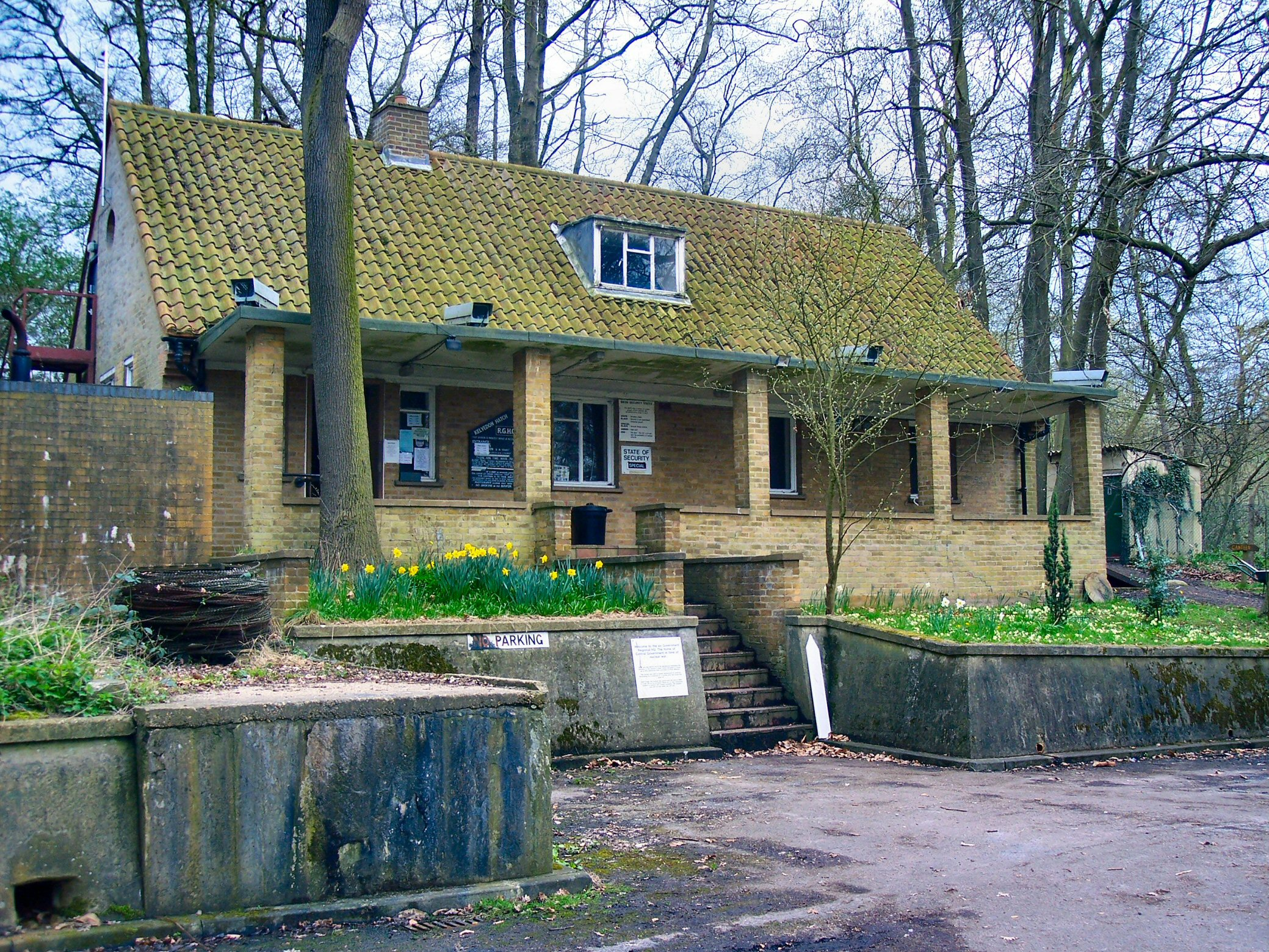
Surface building accessing the Kelvedon Hatch Secret Nuclear Bunker

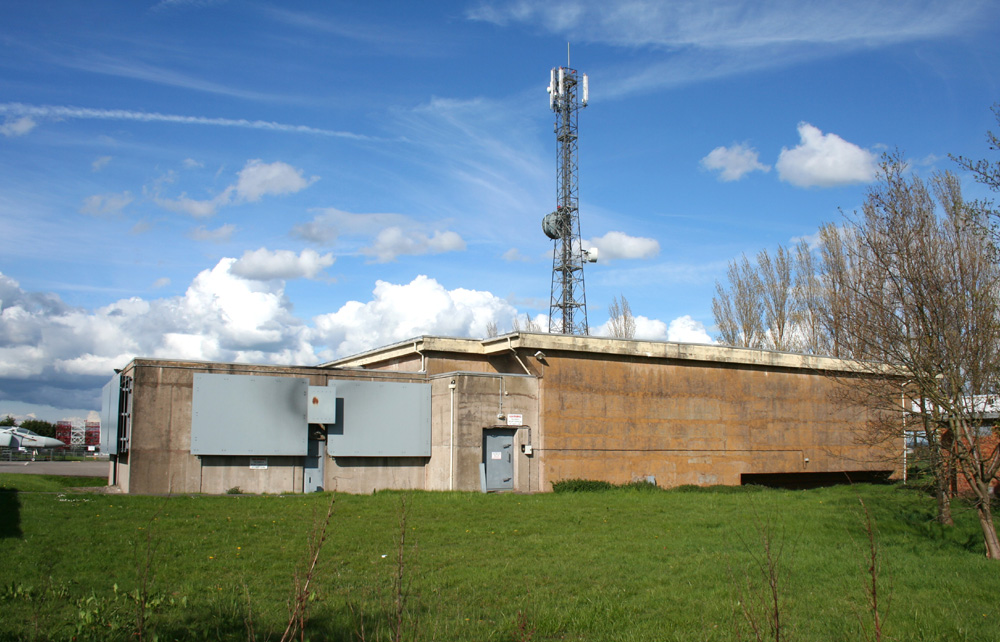
Surface building accessing the Hack Green Secret Nuclear Bunker

== See also ==
- Python plan
- Region 6 War Room
- Operation Candid
- Royal Observer Corps
- Spies for Peace
