= Operation Corona =

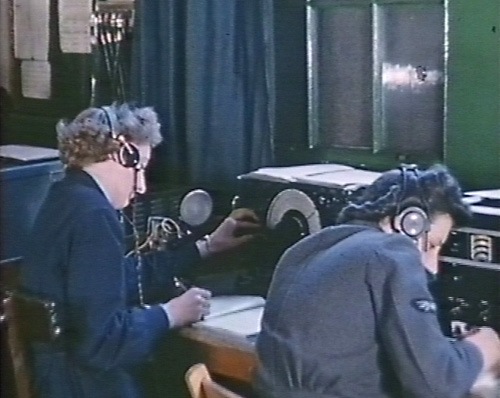
WAAF Operation Corona Radio Operators

Operation Corona was a Royal Air Force (RAF) initiative to confuse German nightfighter defences during RAF bomber raids on German cities during World War II.

== Personnel ==
The RAF used both native speakers and people who could speak German to a standard where they could be taken for a native speaker to impersonate German air defence officers. They initiated communications via radio with German night fighter pilots and countermanded previously given orders, thus reducing the efficiency of German air defence.

Operation Corona was possible because before the war many people, mostly Jews, had fled Nazi Germany and some of them had settled in the United Kingdom. These people were very valuable to RAF Bomber Command, since between them they natively spoke any German accent and hence were capable of countermanding the orders given from the senior German officers in the Air Defence headquarters, and so could redirect the nightfighters to other targets or give them orders to land immediately at an airbase.

== Transmitters ==
Three 90 ft transmitters built at West Kingsdown in Kent, with a larger 240 ft mast at Wrotham.

== Aircraft ==
Other aircraft operations included 192 Sqn in Huntingdonshire, which intercepted broadcasts and radar, with Mosquito aircraft, and 101 Sqn with Lancasters at RAF Ludford Magna in Lincolnshire.

== History ==
The service was first set up at RAF Hawkinge by Air Commodore Lyster Fettiplace Blandy (September 21 1874 - June 7 1964).

The first use of Corona was during a bombing raid on the German industrial centre of Kassel on the night of 22 to 23 October 1943, organised by Edward Addison, with Hallicrafters SX-28 equipment.

Every half hour, the radio frequency of Luftwaffe nightfighter aircraft was sent from West Kingsdown to the British bomber aircraft on a raid, for the Tinsel (codename) radio equipment to jam this radio frequency.

Woodhead Hall in north Staffordshire was the other main Luftwaffe radio-interception station. Hawkinge and RAF Beachy Head also intercepted transmissions of approaching aircraft.

=== German response ===
In response to Corona the Luftwaffe replaced male fighter controllers with females. The RAF countered this by using German-speaking personnel from the Women's Auxiliary Air Force.

The Luftwaffe intercepted transmissions with their Funkhorchdienst (FHD or H-Dienst) service, set up in September 1936. Two sites were at Telgte and Husum. A Luftwaffe site, known as T.W.O.z.B.V., was set up at Pewsum on the German coast, which was later moved to the French coast at Wissant, run by Theo Osterkamp, and the headquarters of Jagdfliegerführer 2.

== See also ==
- Aspidistra (transmitter)
- List of World War II electronic warfare equipment
