= Skendleby Priory =

Priory in Lincolnshire, England

Coordinates: 53.2043°N 0.1452°E

Skendleby Priory was a priory in the village of Skendleby, Lincolnshire, England.

The believed remains of St James Chapel, Skendleby Priory, were uncovered during archaeological investigations and excavations in 2005. It was a small cell to Bardney Abbey built by Walter de Gant, and recorded by Bede in the seventh century. Bardney Abbey was founded no later than 697, but destroyed by a Danish raid in 869.
