= Region 6 War Room =

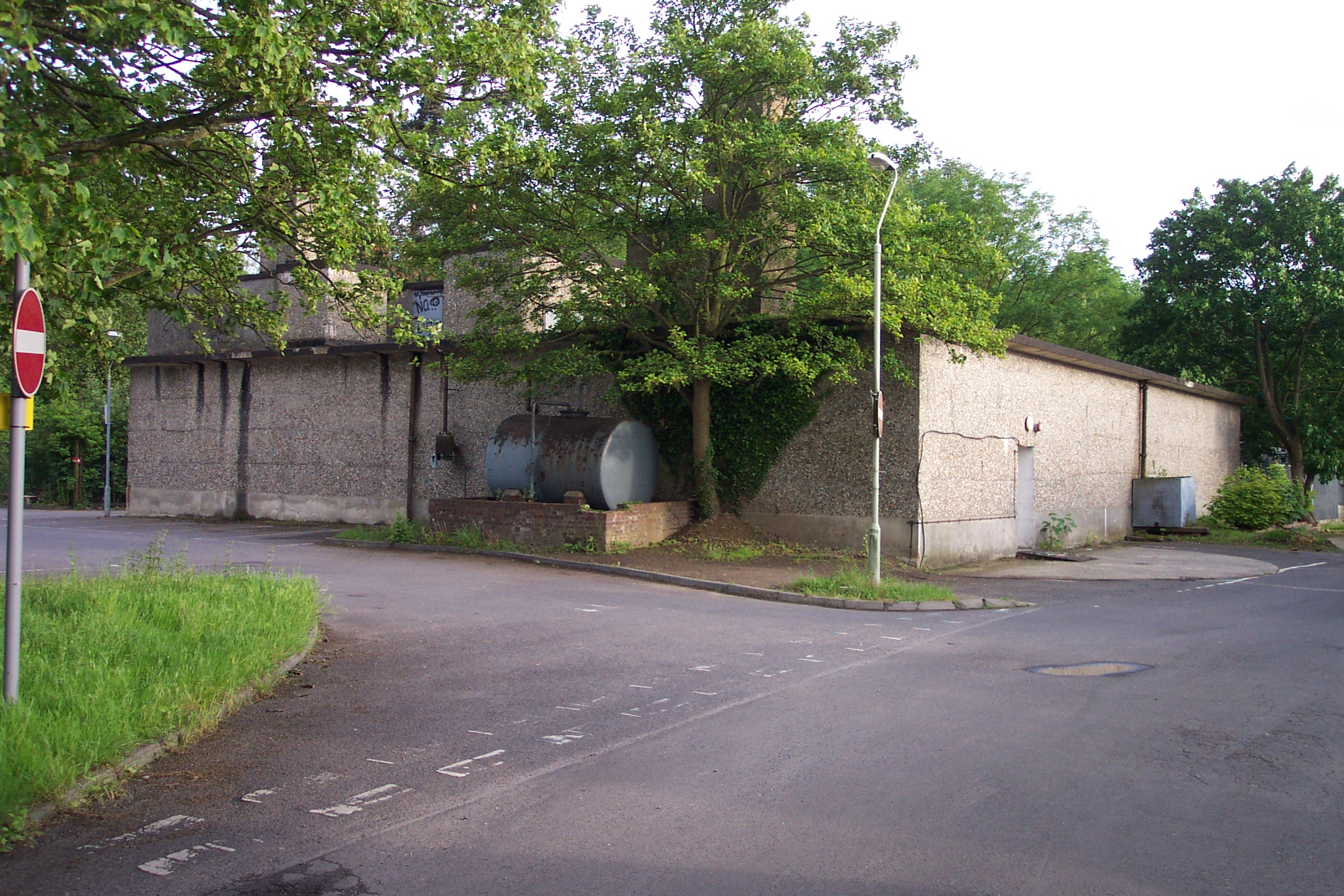
- Surface entrance building to the former Region 6 War Room

- Location within Reading, Berkshire

General information
- Type: Nuclear bunker
- Location: Reading, Berkshire, UK
- Coordinates: 51.4390°N 0.9345°W
- Construction started: 1950s

Listed Building – Grade II
- Official name: Reading War Room ('The Citadel'), University of Reading
- Designated: 10 March 2009
- Reference no.: 1393194

The Region 6 War Room is a nuclear bunker dating from the early days of the Cold War, on the Whiteknights Park campus of the University of Reading in the English town of Reading. It is one of a number of such Regional War Rooms built during the 1950s and designed to co-ordinate civil defence in the event of an attack on the country using conventional bombs or atom bombs.

== Cold War usage ==
In the event of war, the war room would have housed the Regional Commissioner and his staff who would have directed the strategic response to air raids throughout the counties of Berkshire, Buckinghamshire, Dorset, Hampshire, Oxfordshire, and the Isle of Wight. The Regional Commissioner had the authority to assume the full powers of the central government in this region if contact with central government was lost.

The war room takes the form of a two-level windowless building, with the upper level being above ground level and protected by massive concrete walls, while the lower level is below ground level. The building is surmounted by towers containing filtration equipment. The bunker was designed to cope with attacks by weapons of the type used during the atomic bombings of Hiroshima and Nagasaki during World War II.

The development of the hydrogen bomb and the expectation of mutually assured destruction meant that the war room was both inadequately protected, and seen as too small to support the large live-in staff that would be needed after a major nuclear strike. Its principal responsibilities were transferred to a new Regional Seat of Government 6 (RSG-6) at Warren Row near Maidenhead. Some sources suggest that it continued in use as a civil defence communications centre for some period after this transfer.

== University usage ==
After ceasing to be used for civil defence purposes, the war room was taken over by the university and modified as a secure storage facility for use by the university library. In the university's updated development plan, announced in autumn 2007, the bunker was marked as being scheduled for demolition, along with the wartime 'temporary office buildings'. The land was to be used for a car park. However, in March 2009, the building received a Grade II heritage listing and is now protected. Footage from 2001 shown some parts of the war room covered in mould and many leaks. In 2020 a video posted by Youtuber TheSecretVault, shows that many documents that are stored in there have been covered in mould. Also in video some of the original cold war era equipment from the war room is still there.
