= ROTOR =

1950s British air defence radar system

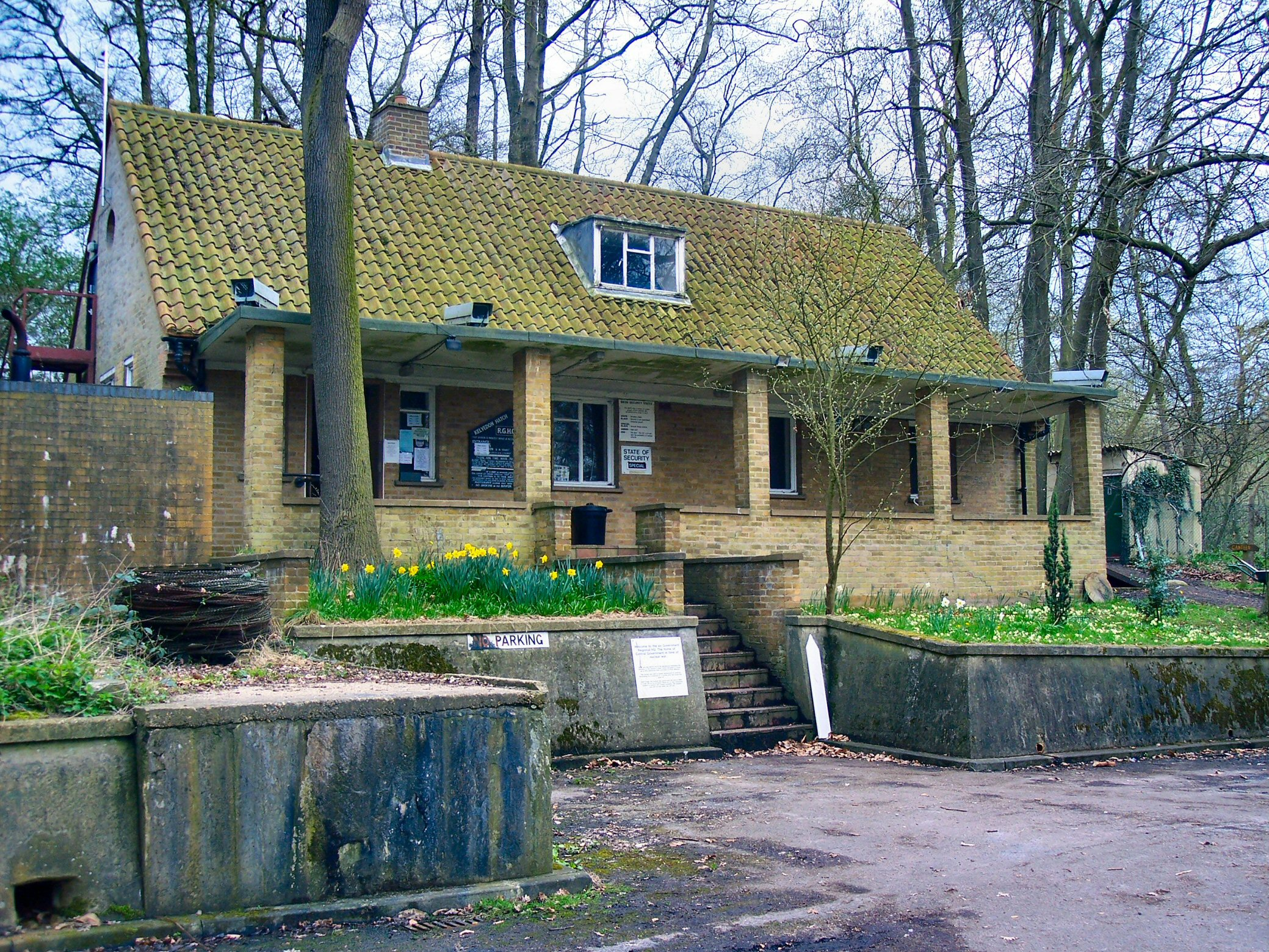
Entrance bungalow to former ROTOR station at Kelvedon Hatch

ROTOR was an elaborate air defence radar system built by the British Government in the early 1950s to counter possible attack by Soviet bombers. To get it operational as quickly as possible, it was initially made up primarily of WWII-era systems, notably the original Chain Home radars for the early warning role, and the AMES Type 7 for plotting and interception control. Data from these stations was sent to a network of control stations, mostly built underground, using an extensive telephone and telex network. A similar expedient system in the United States was the Lashup Radar Network.

== Evolution ==
ROTOR called for the continual upgrading of the network over time, both the radars and the command and control systems. Among these upgrades was a new microwave frequency radar to replace Chain Home c. 1957. An experimental system, Green Garlic, was so successful that it began replacing Chain Home in 1954. In service, these proved so accurate that they could replace the Type 7 radars as well, and their greatly improved range meant that fewer radars would be needed to provide coverage over the entire United Kingdom. This led to the creation of Master Radar Stations that filled both early warning and ground controlled interception roles. The original ROTOR plan for 66 radars was repeatedly reduced, ultimately only requiring half that number of stations for the same level of coverage. Many of the operations rooms, recently completed, were sold, and the original concept of ROTOR with centralized command and control was abandoned.

The introduction of the carcinotron radar jammer in the mid-1950s was a setback for the system; a single aircraft carrying a carcinotron could jam the ROTOR radars so completely that they were rendered useless. At the same time, the introduction of the hydrogen bomb meant that aircraft could deliver a catastrophic blow. The idea of whole-country defence became untenable since there was no way to stop every aircraft, especially in the presence of jamming. The introduction of the ballistic missile resulted in further dramatic changes in the nature of the strategic threat. The only way to defend against missile attacks was deterrence, and if that failed, interceptor aircraft and missiles would have no measurable effect on the eventual outcome.

ROTOR was initially to be replaced by a new network dedicated largely to defending the V-bomber force, the "1958 Plan". This role was eventually abandoned, leaving only the task of locating aircraft carrying jammers to keep the BMEWS radars free from interference and prevent a successful sneak attack by missiles. Such a system did not require a large number of radars nor country-wide coverage. To reduce the cost of this much smaller network, studies on integrating the military radars with civilian air traffic control led to the Linesman/Mediator system of only five primary stations. The original ROTOR was replaced by Linesman in stages, starting in 1967.

== Post-war situation ==
As the threat of German air attack became ever more remote during the later stages of the Second World War, UK radar operations were wound down, and by the end of the war they were already largely unused. After the war ended, there was a general feeling that another war was at least ten years in the future. Given the rapid ongoing improvements in radar systems through this period, the Air Ministry felt there was no point introducing new radars that would likely become obsolete in a few years. They planned to allow radar to continue developing through this period and use the existing WWII-era systems in the meantime.

To consider the issue in more depth, the Cherry Report was commissioned in 1945. This noted that the increasing speeds of new bombers, and especially future designs that were jet-powered, would travel across the plotting boards of the existing Dowding system so rapidly that they would fly off the maps before interception could be arranged. The report suggested that a radar with 250 miles (400 km) range would be needed to replace the existing AMES Type 7/GCI systems, which were limited to about 90 miles (140 km) against bomber-sized targets. Estimating that such a radar would be available around 1957, the report suggested that existing GCI stations should receive upgraded antennas with more accuracy, new electronics for better performance, upgrades to their display systems, four Type 13's for height measuring, and two Type 14 units for anti-jamming use. Additionally, their information would be sent to six new command centres, who would produce much larger maps of the airspace, up to 1,000 miles (1,600 km) across. All of the sites would be upgraded with hardened bunkers to allow them to survive a near miss.

== New urgency ==
The Berlin Blockade of July 1948 led to concerns about the next war's estimated time-frame, and calls to re-activate the CH stations. A White Paper on the state of the network was completed in March 1949. This found that the stations were in a terrible state, with many of them suffering weather damage and a number of them having been broken into and vandalized. A complete defence would also require 1152 fighters and 265 AA regiments, of which only 352 fighters and 75 regiments were actually available. All of this was given extreme urgency with the 29 August 1949 test of the first Soviet atomic bomb. That month, a new directive stated RAF Fighter Command's mission was the defence of Great Britain.

It was known that the Soviets had made exact copies of the B-29 Superfortress as the Tupolev Tu-4, and these aircraft had the performance needed to reach the UK with a nuclear payload. These were fast, but not fast enough to escape the existing radars if they were upgraded as the Cherry Report suggested. Most of the new network would be made up of 28 rebuilt Chain Home systems, while the rest were taken from the existing selection of Chain Home Low, Chain Home Extra Low and the various ground-controlled interception (GCI) radars. This was, in part, a stop-gap measure anticipating the availability of the dramatically improved radar, which was now known as the Microwave Early Warning (MEW), and expected in the 1957 timeframe. Interception guidance would still be handled by existing systems in either case.

All of the radars were to be improved in terms of siting, with the addition of hardened control bunkers to protect the operators from a conventional attack. On the east coast, where a Soviet attack would be most likely, the bunkers were underground in the 'R' series (R1, R2, R3 and R4 etc.), while those on the western side of the UK were generally semi-sunken hardened structures ('R6') or above ground Uni-Seco type huts (Hartland Point etc.). The R-series bunkers themselves were otherwise similar, featuring 10-foot-thick (3.0 m) concrete walls with all equipment, operations generators and air conditioning housed inside.

Additionally, ROTOR re-arranged the existing RAF Fighter Command structure into six Sector Operational Commands (SOC) with their own command bunkers (three-level R4 protected accommodation). Only four of these were built. Additional Anti-Aircraft Operations Rooms were built to coordinate the British Army's AA defences in the same overall system. The entire network of bunkers, radars, fighter control and command centres required 350,000 tons of concrete, 20,000 tons of steel and thousands of miles of telephone and telex connections.

The work was mainly carried out by the Marconi Wireless and Telegraph Company in several phases, called ROTOR 1, ROTOR 2 and ROTOR 3.

== Post-ROTOR ==
As work on the Microwave Early Warning system began, researchers at the Royal Radar Establishment were experimenting with new cavity magnetrons and crystal detectors that, combined with an ad hoc antenna, increased the range of their existing microwave radars on the order of four times. While the resulting "Green Garlic" did not meet all of the requirements for the original MEW, it was close enough and would be available years earlier.

The decision was made to make the MEW a long-term development with additional features such as moving target indication, while the Green Garlic would be mated to an enormous antenna that would give it a range of over 200 nautical miles (370 km; 230 mi). Installations, under the name AMES Type 80, began in 1954 with the first systems declared operational the next year. As installations continued, it was found that the accuracy was such that they could also be used to direct the interceptors, with no need to forward the information to the ROTOR control centres. By concentrating all of the plotting at one site the total number of operators was greatly reduced.

As a result of the introduction of the Type 80, many of the existing ROTOR sites were rationalized into Master Radar Stations (MRS), while the rest were made redundant, some only two years after opening. During the same period, the introduction of the first surface-to-air missiles rendered the anti-aircraft guns obsolete, and the Army handed the air defence mission entirely to the RAF. All of the AAOR sites were closed.

A few of the ROTOR and AAOR stations were re-used for Regional Seats of Government or local authority wartime headquarters. Until the end of the Cold War, many of the sites were retained by the government. They were later sold to private buyers, converted into museums (for example Hack Green) or transferred to the National Air Traffic Control Services.

== UK sites ==
Locations of former ROTOR sites in the United Kingdom

Site Name	Site Designator	Grid Reference	Site Purpose
Aird Uig	WIU	NB 047390	R10 CEW Type 80
Anstruther	FAT	NO 568088	R3 Type 80
Barnton Quarry	MHA	NT 203748	R4 SOC Caledonian Sector
Bawburgh	WRK	TG 165080	R4 SOC Eastern Sector
Bawdsey	PKD	TM 347388	R3 GCI(E)
Beachy Head	HEB	TV 590959	R1 CEW Type 80
Bempton	RMF	TA 192736	R1 CEW
Boulmer	EZS	NU 240125	R3 GCI Type 80
Box	XOB	ST 850690	SOC Southern Sector
Buchan	GBU	NK 113408	R3 GCI Type 80
Calvo	CAL	NY 144545	R8 GCI
Charmy Down	CHA	ST 768702	R8 GCI
Chenies	HAM	TQ 015997	R8 GCI
Cold Hesledon	IDW	NZ 417468	R1 CEW/CHEL
Comberton	COB	SO 968461	R8 GCI
Crosslaw	HCV	NT 880680	R2 CHEL
Danby Beacon		NZ 732097	CH
Douglas Wood		NO 488415	CH
Drone Hill		NT 845665	CH
Drytree		SW 732218	CH
Dunkirk	TDE	TR 076595	CH Type 80
Fairlight	GWB	TQ 862113	R2 CHEL(A)
Faraid Head	RAI	NC 389714	R10 CEW Type 80
Folly		SM 858195	CH
Foreness	WJW	TR 385710	R2 CHEL
Gailes	FUL	NS 327361	R8 GCI Type 80
Goldsborough	JEX	NZ 830138	R2 CHEL(A)
Hack Green	HAK	SJ 647483	R6 GCI
Hartland Point	HAT	SS 237277	R8 GCI
Hayscastle Cross	CHX	SM 920256	CH Type 80
High Street		TM 411720	CH
Hill Head		NJ 947616	CH
Holmpton	VQJ	TA 367225	R3 GCI(B) Type 80
Hope Cove	HOP	SX 716374	R6 GCI
Hopton	TOH	TM 540990	R2 CHEL(B)
Inverbervie	LGZ	NO 841734	R1 CEW
Kelvedon Hatch	XSL	TQ 561995	R4 SOC Metropolitan Sector
Kilchiaran	ECK	NR 207616	R11 CHEL
Killard Point		IJ 605435	R8 GCI Type 80
Langtoft	LAT	TF 155129	R6 GCI Type 80
Longley Lane	LOA	SD 541365	SOC Western Sector
Murlough Bay	URB	ID 213407	R11 CHEL
Neatishead	BWP	TG 346184	R3 GCI
Netherbutton	BNT	HY 464045	CH
Pevensey		TQ 644073	CH
Poling		TQ 043052	CH
Portland	NIB	SY 696735	R1 CEW
Prestatyn	SYP	SJ 079819	R11 CHEL
Ringstead	SRD	SY 751817	CH
Rye		TQ 968232	CH
Sandwich (Ash)	YTM	TR 303574	R3 GCI Type 80
Saxa Vord	AXA	HP 629165	R10 CEW Type 80
Scarinish	FLY	NM 032456	R8 GCI Type 80
School Hill	HSL	NO 908982	CH
Seaton Snook	DYR	NZ 519280	R3 GCI Type 80
Sennen		SW 376246	CH
Shipton	KFY	SE 542618	R4 SOC Northern Sector
Skendleby	UPI	TF 438709	R3 GCI
Snaefell	MOI	SC 397869	R11 CHEL
Sopley	AVO	SZ 163977	R3 GCI Type 80
St Annes	SAN	SD 348303	R8 GCI
St Margarets	AGC	TR 370451	R1 CEW
St Twynnells	TWY	SR 944976	R6 GCI Type 80
Staxton Wold		TA 023778	CH
Stenigot		TF 256827	CH
Stoke Holy Cross		TG 257028	CH
Swingate		TR 335429	CH
Trelanvean		SW 762193	CH
Treleaver	TEL	SW 766174	R6 GCI(B) Type 80
Trerew	RTW	SW 812585	CH
Trewan Sands	TES	SH 322754	R8 GCI
Trimingham	QLE	TG 290385	R1 CEW Type 80 CHEL
Truleigh Hill	SNG	TQ 224109	R2 CHEL
Ventnor	OJC	SZ 565784	CH R1 CEW Type 80
Wartling	ZUN	TQ 662088	R3 GCI Type 80
West Beckham		TG 142389	CH
West Myne	ZEM	SS 928486	R11 CHEL
West Prawle		SX 771374	CH
Wick	IKA	ND 326537	R8 GCI

At the Radar Research Establishment in Malvern, Worcestershire a ROTOR bunker was constructed above ground to allow equipment to be tested in an operational environment. The building, locally designated as H Building, originally incorporated a replica of the sector operations centre at RAF Bawburgh. The building was demolished June 2020.

== The sites today ==
RAF Staxton Wold is the only Chain Home site still used as a military radar site but with no remains of the CH station on site after being rebuilt for Linesman/Mediator in 1964. Today it is the former home of an RAF TPS 77 RRH (remote radar head).

RAF Boulmer is a working RAF building, which is housed in an ex-"ROTOR" R3 RAF Boulmer ('EZS') GCI R3 ROTOR Radar Station & Control and Reporting Centre in the UK Air Surveillance and Control System.

In terms of current condition, the ROTOR sites vary from demolished to intact. Hack Green has now been converted into a museum, and is open to the public. It features many more exhibits than just its historical role, such as a Soviet Army room and a collection of radars and Geiger counters.

For example, West Myne in Somerset was the last ROTOR 3 CHEL site. It was completed in 1957 after the introduction of the Type 80 radar and after many ROTOR stations had already closed. The site was within Exmoor National Park and its creation was strenuously opposed by the National Trust who lost no time in obliterating the site immediately after closure.

Many of the buildings have been re-purposed since being active as ROTOR sites. An example is the Bawburgh R4 SOC which was re-purposed as SRHQ4.1 and then RGHQ4.1 to suit the evolving needs of government. The building is intact, but it has been significantly reconfigured since its use as a ROTOR SOC, notably with the addition of an extra floor and the flooring-over of the original R4 operations well.

== Sources ==
- Gough, Jack (1993). Watching the Skies: The History of Ground Radar in the Air Defense of the United Kingdom. Her Majesty's Stationery Office. ISBN 9780117727236.
- Morris, Alec (1996). "UK Control & Reporting System from the End of WWII to ROTOR and Beyond". In Hunter, Sandy (ed.). Defending Northern Skies. Royal Air Force Historical Society.
