= Scotland's Secret Bunker =

Museum in a Scottish former nuclear bunker

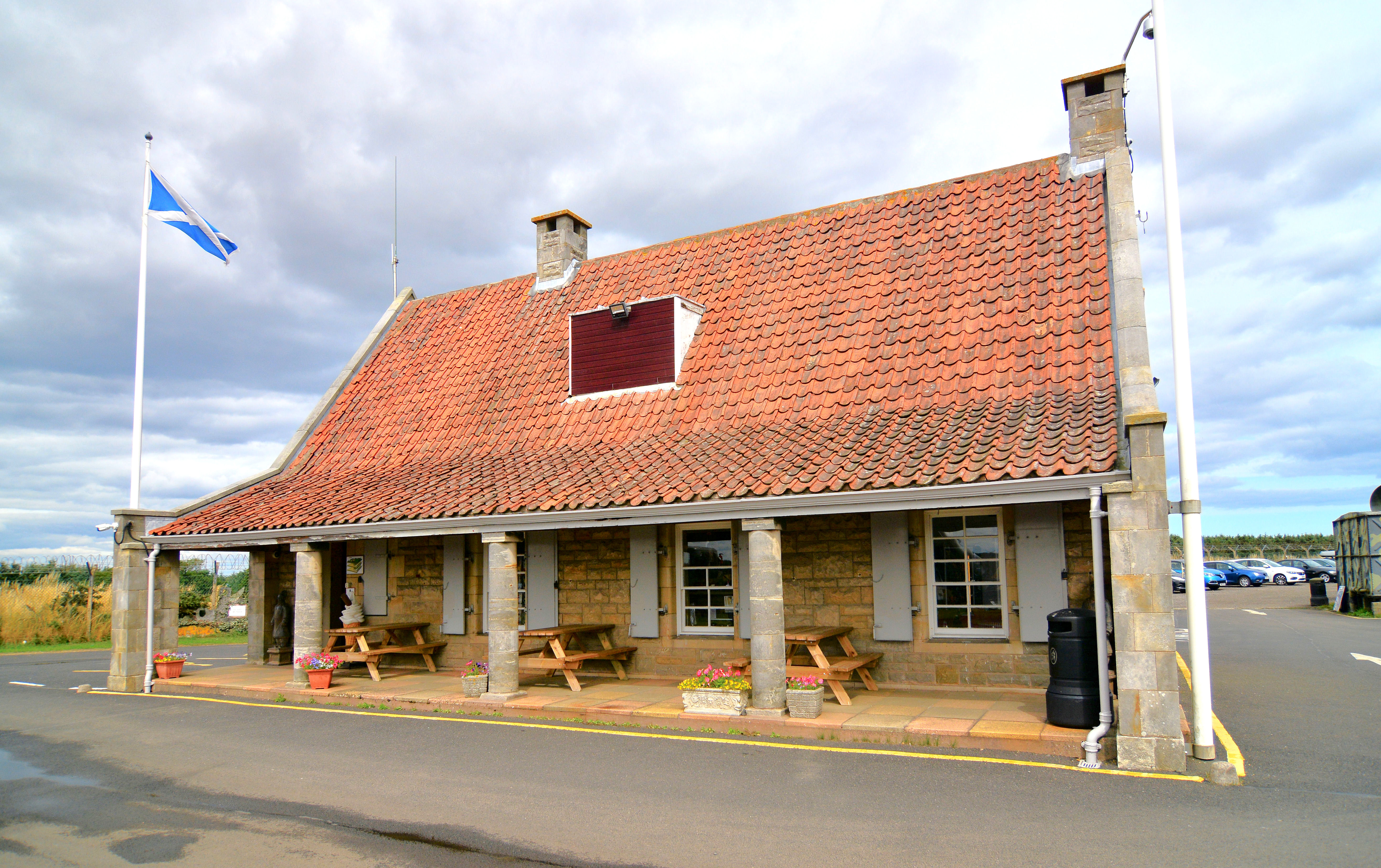
- Former name: RAF Troywood
- Established: 1994
- Location: St Andrews, Scotland
- Coordinates: 56°16′13.86″N 2°41′54.52″W
- Type: Cold War museum

Scotland's Secret Bunker is a nuclear bunker turned into a Cold War museum.

== History ==
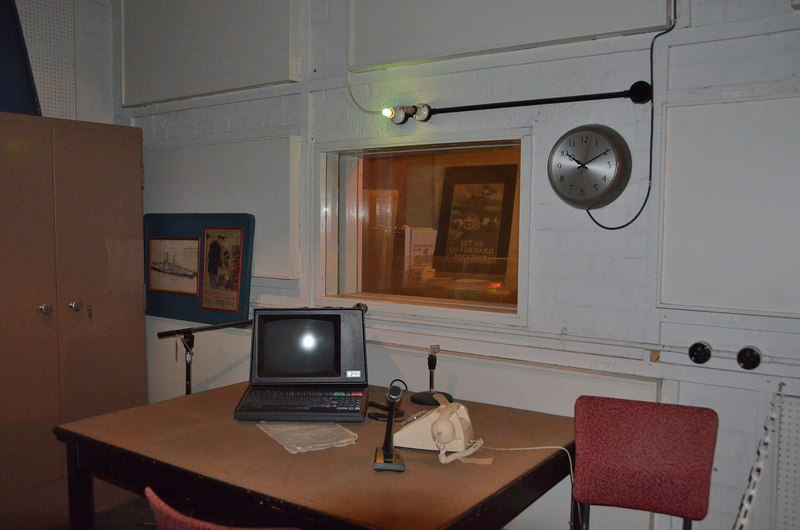
Broadcast studio

The nuclear bunker was built in 1952 with the original purpose of being a Royal Air Force radar station as part of the ROTOR system, it was officially named RAF Troywood. In the 1960s, it was transferred to the Civil Defence Corps. The facility had a cinema, broadcasting capabilities and telephone switchboard. In 1993, it was decommissioned, and became a Cold War museum.

In 2004, a man broke into the facility using a JCB digger. He sealed himself inside the bunker, leading to stand-off between him and armed police officers. This ended after 3 days, after which the man was committed to psychiatric care.
