= Hack Green Secret Nuclear Bunker =

Former government-owned nuclear bunker in Cheshire, England

Coordinates: 53.0268°N 2.5307°W

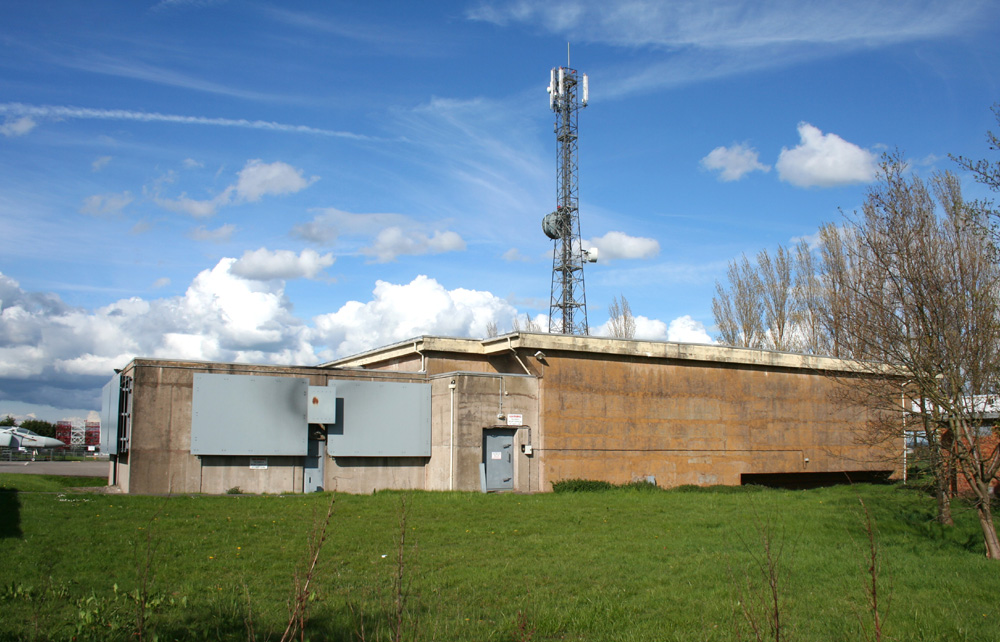
Hack Green Secret Nuclear Bunker

The Hack Green Secret Nuclear Bunker is a former government-owned nuclear bunker located at Hack Green, Cheshire, England.

== History ==
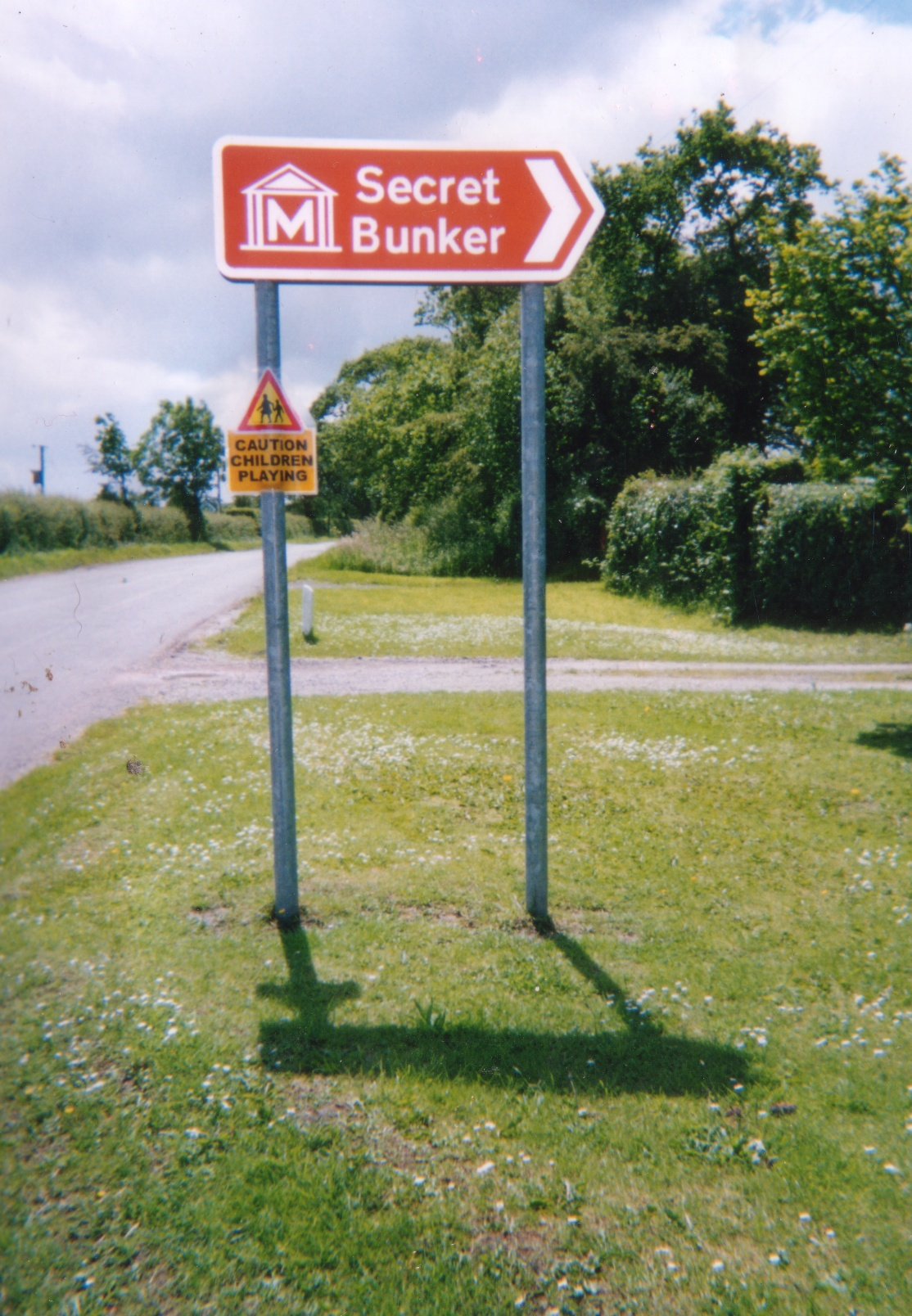
Signpost showing directions to the secret bunker.

The first military use of the area was in World War II, when a Starfish site was established at Hack Green. Its purpose was to confuse Luftwaffe bombers looking for the vital railway junction at Crewe.

A ground-controlled interception (GCI) radar station was added.

In the 1950s, the site was modernised as part of the ROTOR project. This included the provision of a substantial semi-sunk reinforced concrete bunker or blockhouse (type R6).

The station, officially designated RAF Hack Green, was also known as Mersey Radar. It provided an air traffic control service to military aircraft crossing civil airspace.

The site was abandoned and remained derelict for many years until taken over by the Home Office. The R6 bunker was then rebuilt as a Regional Government Headquarters (RGHQs) – one of a network of 17 such sites throughout the UK – designed to enable the government to continue in the aftermath of a major nuclear attack on the UK.

Around 1992, following the end of the Cold War, the Home Office abandoned its network of RGHQs and sold many of the sites. The Hack Green Bunker was purchased by a private company and subsequently opened to the public in 1998 as a museum with a Cold War theme.

== Current status ==
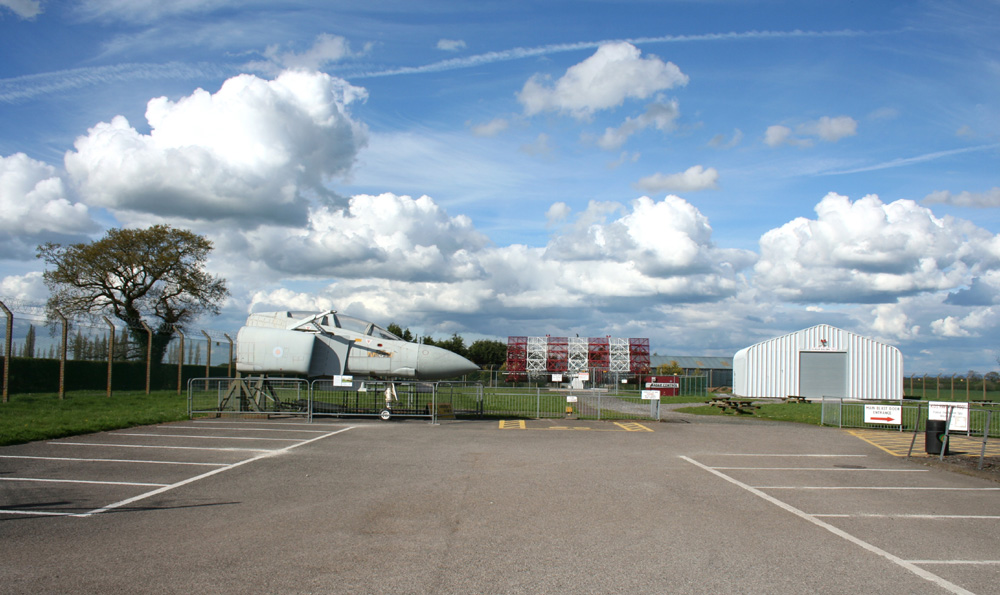
Exhibits have included the nose section of an F-4 Phantom jet

The bunker is open to the public most of the year. It has a substantial collection of military and Cold War memorabilia, including one of the largest collections of decommissioned nuclear weapons in the world. It also houses Ballistic Missile Early Warning System equipment originally from RAF High Wycombe.

The museum includes information about the function of the bunker during the Cold War. There is a simulator designed to simulate conditions in the bunker during a nuclear attack. Visitors can watch the BBC film The War Game, produced to inform the public of what would be likely to happen in a nuclear attack on Britain. Younger visitors to the museum can navigate the rooms in a game to find the "Cold War Spy Mice" (a large number of toy mice positioned in numerous rooms), the objective being to locate as many mice as possible and return their report to the desk for a prize; this avoids the more disturbing aspects of the bunker, such as the medical room, where a mannequin is depicted with symptoms of burns and radiation poisoning.

== On television ==
Hack Green was featured in episode two of the television series Most Haunted: Midsummer Murders in which the team investigates the murder of a soldier. It was featured once again in series 11.

The band Everything Everything filmed the music video for their 2009 single "MY KZ, UR BF" inside Hack Green.

== See also ==
- Radar
- Linesman/Mediator
- Central Government War Headquarters
- Civil Contingencies Secretariat
- RAF Rudloe Manor
- Corsham Computer Centre
- Continuity of government
- RAF High Wycombe bunker
- Wartime Broadcasting Service
- Kelvedon Hatch Secret Nuclear Bunker
- List of museums in Cheshire
