= Warren Row =

Coordinates: 51°31′10″N 0°49′49″W

- Village
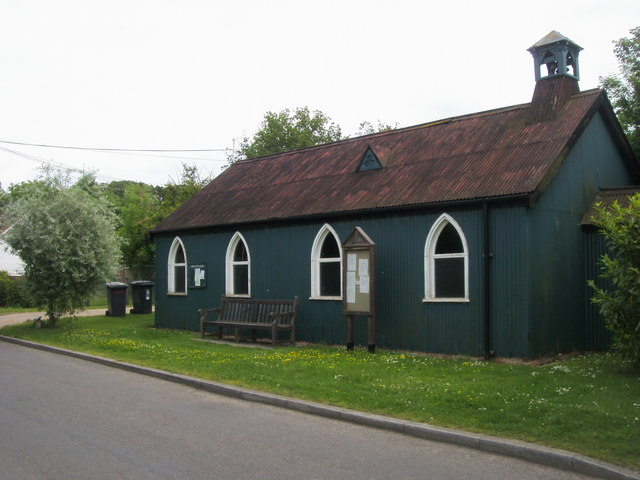
- St Paul's Mission Church

- Location within Berkshire
- OS grid reference: SU813807
- Metropolitan borough: Windsor and Maidenhead
- Metropolitan county: Berkshire
- Region: South East
- Country: England
- Sovereign state: United Kingdom
- Post town: MAIDENHEAD
- Postcode district: RG10
- Dialling code: 01628
- Police: Thames Valley
- Fire: Royal Berkshire
- Ambulance: South Central
- UK Parliament: Maidenhead

Warren Row is a village in Berkshire, England, and part of the civil parish of Hurley. The settlement lies between the A321 road, A4 and A4130 roads, and is located approximately 3.5 miles (5.6 km) southeast of Henley-on-Thames. It contains a green tin tabernacle church.

== History ==
Warren Row was formed by a few group of cottages on the boundaries of three estates - Hall Place, Rosehill and Park Place. St Paul's Mission, the tin tabernacle church, was built in 1894 and was purchased for just over £100. During World War II the local chalk pits were used as an underground factory.

Between 1958 and 1961 a secret bunker was built in the chalk mines as the village had been identified as the location for a regional seat of government in case of nuclear attack on London. The bunker was discovered in 1963 by a few anti-nuclear protesters, who referred to themselves as 'Spies for Peace'. It was sold in 1988, being bought by a data storage company and later also used to store wines.
