= RAF Beachy Head =

RAF Beachy Head
- Near Eastbourne, East Sussex in England

Site information
- Type: RAF Radar station
- Owner: Air Ministry
- Operator: Royal Air Force
- Condition: Part Demolished

Location
- RAF Beachy Head within East Sussex RAF Beachy Head (the United Kingdom)
- Coordinates: 50.738°N 0.251°E

Site history
- Built: 1939
- In use: 1940–1960

RAF Beachy Head is a former Royal Air Force radar station and one of the many Chain Home Low radar stations, being situated near Beachy Head and Eastbourne in East Sussex, England. It featured a Type 16 radar that was monitored from RAF Kenley.

RAF Beachy Head saw much activity in the Second World War covering the area from Brighton to Hastings from ten miles out to sea, but began to decline in importance in the 1950s.

== ROTOR ==
In 1952, a ROTOR site was built, which closed in May 1958. The Coastguard used one of the buildings. It closed with the end of the Cold War and partly demolished in 1996.
