= Corsham Computer Centre =

Underground British Ministry of Defence installation

Coordinates: 51°25′39″N 2°12′23″W

The Corsham Computer Centre (CCC) is an underground British Ministry of Defence (MoD) installation in Corsham, Wiltshire, built in the 1980s. According to the MoD, the centre "processes data in support of the Royal Navy". The centre has been similarly described by Des Browne in 2007, then Secretary of State for Defence, as a "data processing facility in support of Royal Navy operations".

In written evidence to the Defence Select Committee in 2007, the Scottish Campaign for Nuclear Disarmament suggested that the centre supports the software maintenance of the United Kingdom nuclear deterrent programme, Trident (which is operated by the Royal Navy). A The Herald newspaper report in 2016 stated that the "UK Software Facility" (UKSF), responsible for the Trident targeting system which was upgraded in 2015, was believed to be located at the Corsham Computer Centre.

The facility was built near Hudswell Quarry, and close to the Box Tunnel part of the broader complex of tunnels and quarries in the Corsham area and adjacent to the former Central Ammunition Depot built before the Second World War. It is located a few hundred metres north east of the current MoD Corsham.

The site falls within a wider facilities management contract, the Bristol Bath Total Facilities Management project. It was awarded to Debut Services, a special purpose vehicle of Babcock Defence and Bovis Lend Lease, in September 2007 for a period of three years, with the option to extend the contract for a further three years.
