= Kelvedon Hatch Secret Nuclear Bunker =

ROTOR air defence control bunker converted to a Regional Seat of Government

Coordinates: 51°40′18.5″N 0°15′23.6″E

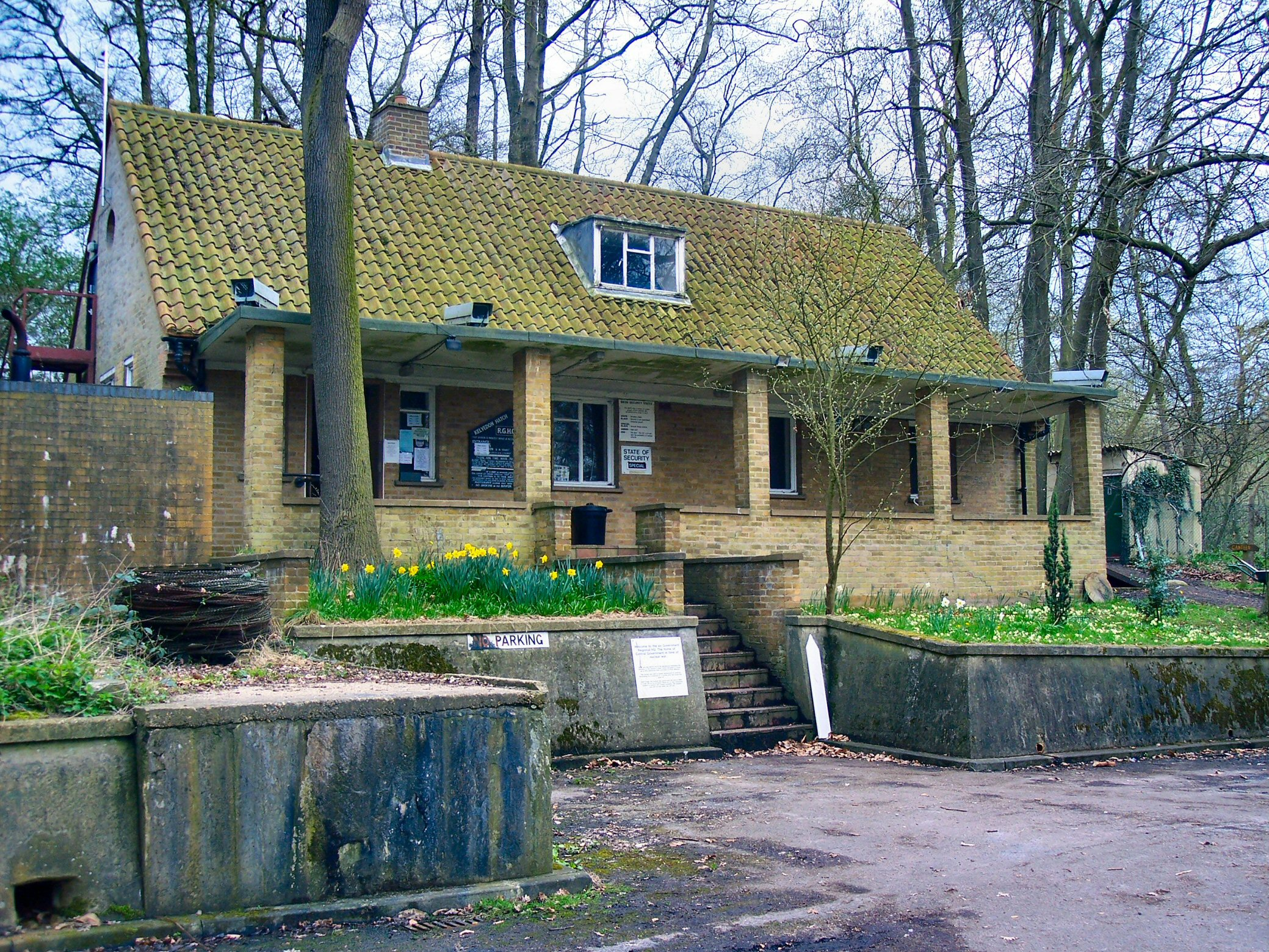
The bungalow that serves as the entrance to the Kelvedon Hatch Nuclear Bunker

The Kelvedon Hatch Secret Nuclear Bunker at Kelvedon Hatch, in the Borough of Brentwood in the English county of Essex, is a large underground bunker maintained during the Cold War as a potential regional government headquarters. Since being decommissioned in 1992, the bunker has been open to the public as a tourist attraction, with a museum focusing on its Cold War history.

== Building and intended purpose ==
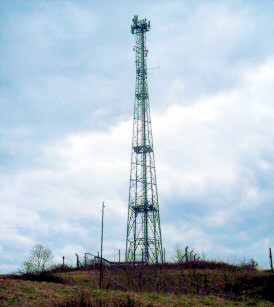
Radio antenna at Kelvedon Hatch

The three-level bunker was first built on compulsorily purchased farmland as an air defence station (an 'R4' Sector Operations Control or SOC) as part of the RAF ROTOR air defence project. Upon the demise of the ROTOR SOC the remaining Nuclear Reporting Cell and UKWMO elements were incorporated into a Home Office 'Regional Seat of Government' or RSG.

The bunker was able to hold various numbers (in the hundreds) of military and civilian personnel, the numbers changing over the years as the role of the building changed from SOC to RSG and, in its later years, 'Regional Government Headquarters' or RGHQ. In the event of a nuclear strike the RSG/RGHQs would be tasked to organise the survival of the population and continue government operations.

== History ==
The Kelvedon Hatch bunker was built in 1952–53 as part of ROTOR. ROTOR was a programme to improve and harden Britain's air defence network. It was constructed by Peter Lind & Company of London who still trades today. The bunker was a hardened (three level 'R4') Sector Operations Centre (SOC) for RAF Fighter Command. It was to provide command and control of the London Sector of Fighter Command.

From the 1960s to the early 1990s, the UK government (Home Office) maintained the bunker as an emergency regional government defence site. Eventually, in the early 1990s, when nuclear threats in general were seen as diminished, the bunker was sold back to the farming family who had owned the land in the 1950s. It is now a Cold War museum and retains many of its original ROTOR and RSG/RGHQ features.

== Inside the bunker ==
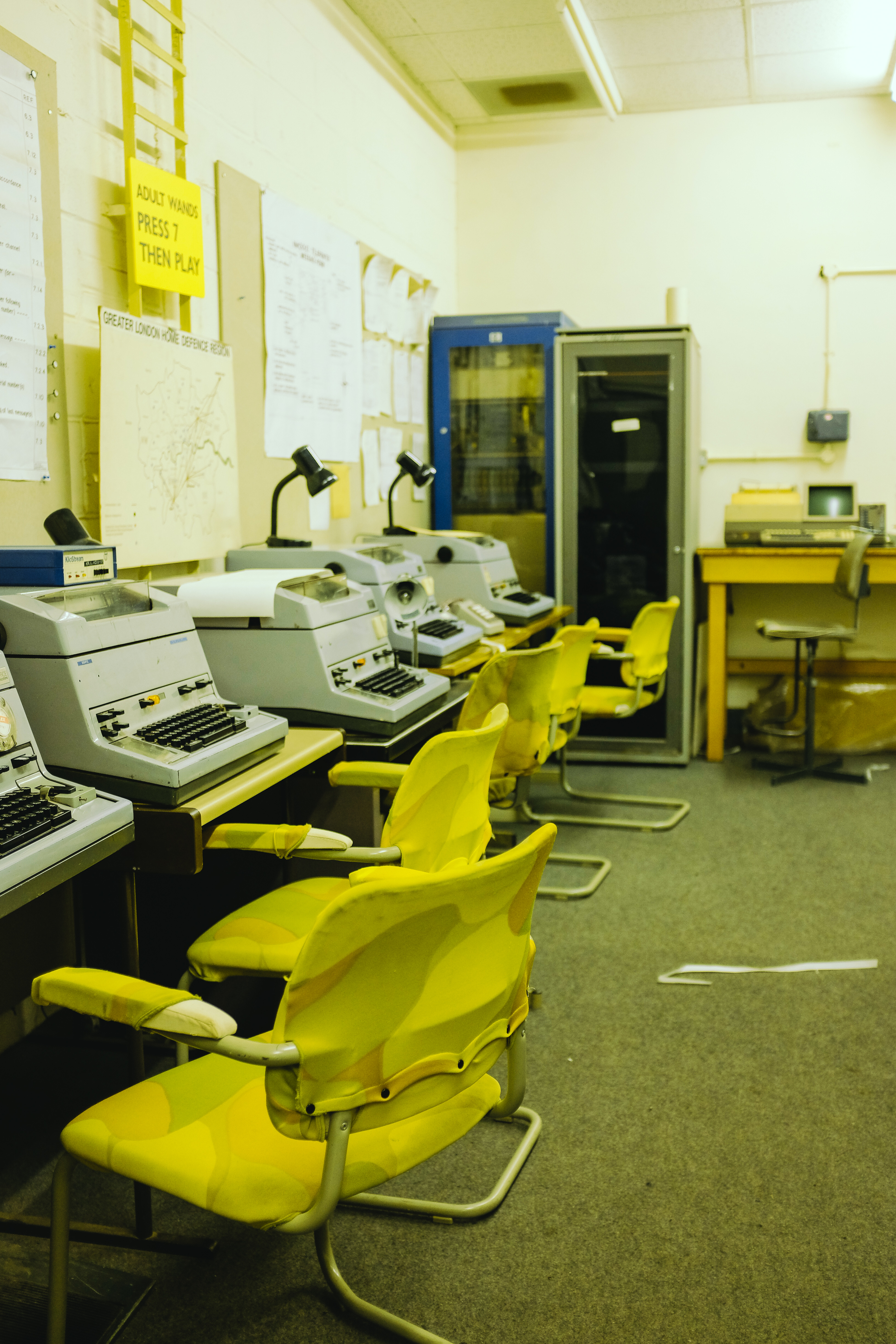
Inside the bunker

The bunker is built 125 feet (38 m) underground and the entrance is through an ordinary-looking bungalow (a standard ROTOR 'Guard House') set amongst trees. The inside of the bungalow leads to a 100-yard-long (91 m) tunnel entering the R4 at its lowest floor (of three). Above are two more floors, the 'hill' which covers it, and a radio mast some distance away.

The bunker was able to accommodate some hundreds of personnel (the numbers changing as function and form varied over the years) and could sustain them for up to three months. The bunker has air conditioning and heating (using the original ROTOR AC-plant but replacing the original coolant with a more 'modern' type [c.1980s]), its own water supply (mains water and its own deep bore hole) and generators, and was equipped with many types of radio equipment, protected (EMP) telecommunications, teleprinter (MSX) networks and various military systems: MOULD (system to provide communications between Regular Army, TA battalions and the Army district and regional headquarters) and CONRAD (government radio communications systems post nuclear strike) etc.

== Modern times ==
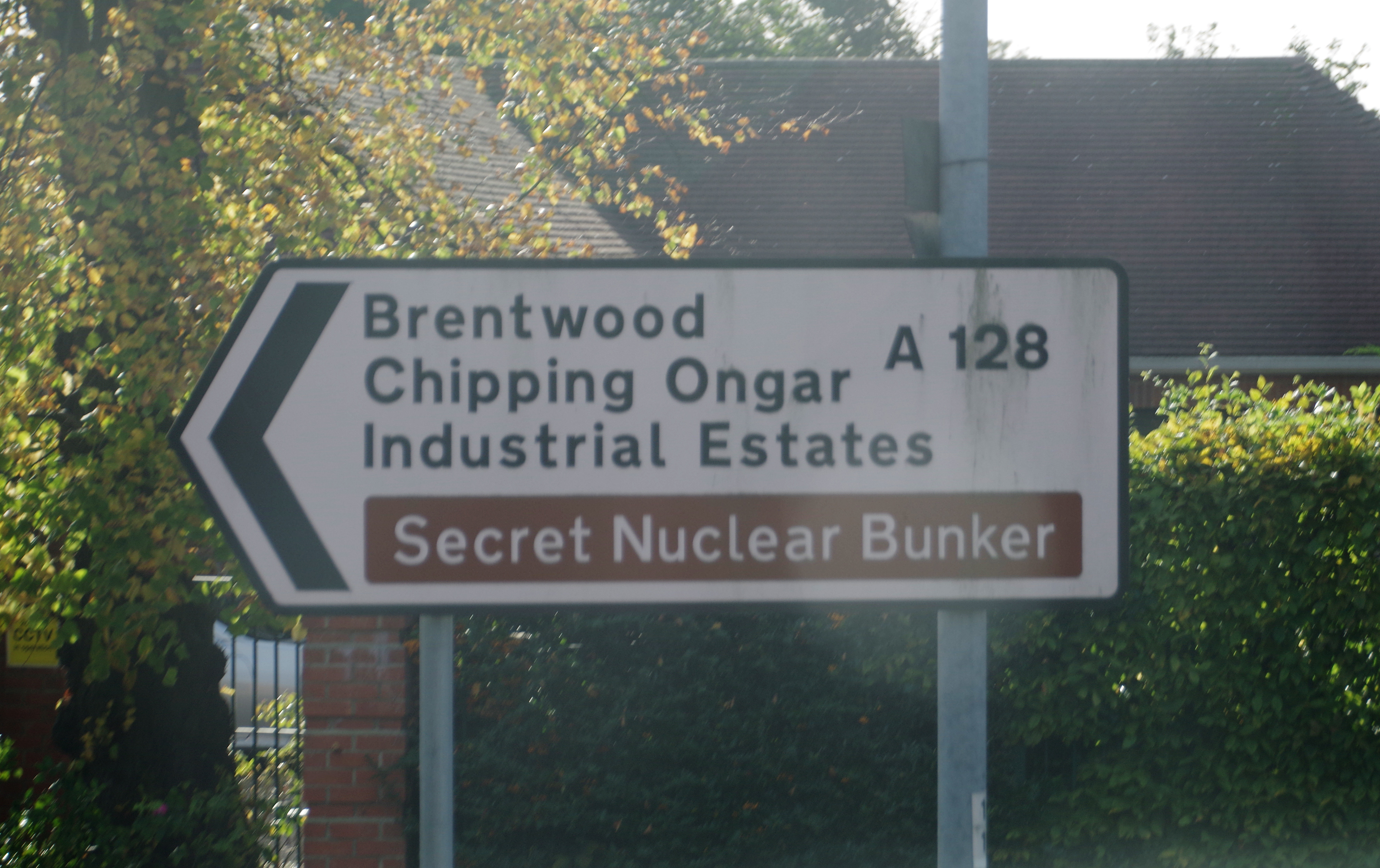
The formerly secret bunker is now a signposted tourist site.

By 1992, the bunker was no longer required and decommissioned. The land was sold back to the original owners, the Parrish family. It has now been renovated and made into a museum and tourist attraction; many locals appreciate the irony of the many brown tourist road signs in the area, clearly directing people to the "Secret Nuclear Bunker". The BBC TV show Top Gear featured the signs.

The bunker was used as a "Killer's Location" for The Murder Game. Both the living quarters and the operational zone were set up for the "Killer's Game" in the finale. It also played a significant role in an episode of New Tricks titled "The Queen's Speech", first broadcast on BBC One on 20 October 2014.

In 2010, the independent British post-apocalyptic/horror film S.N.U.B! was filmed in the bunker.

The 2016 full-motion video game The Bunker, which uses live-action footage, was fully filmed inside the bunker.

== Gallery ==
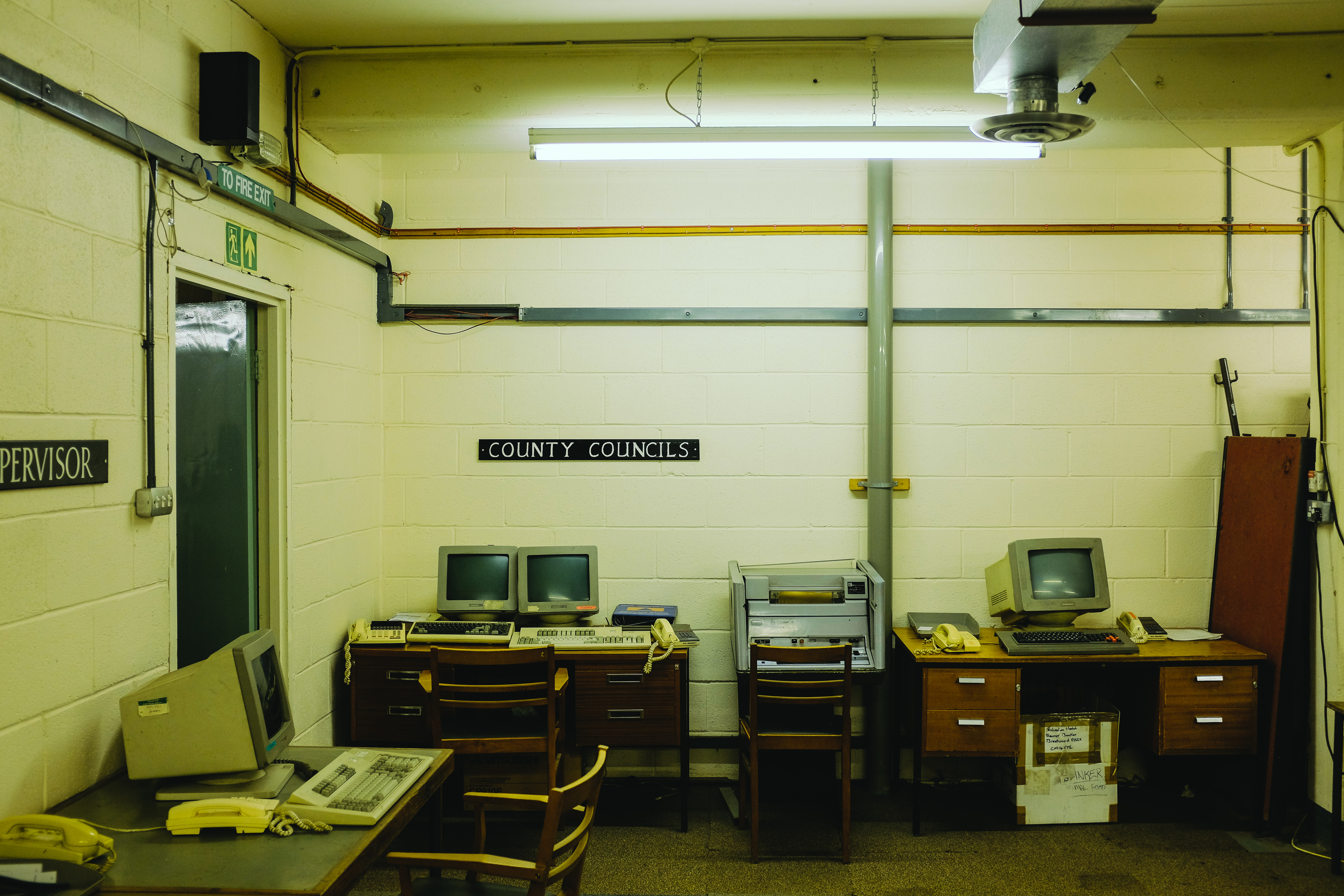

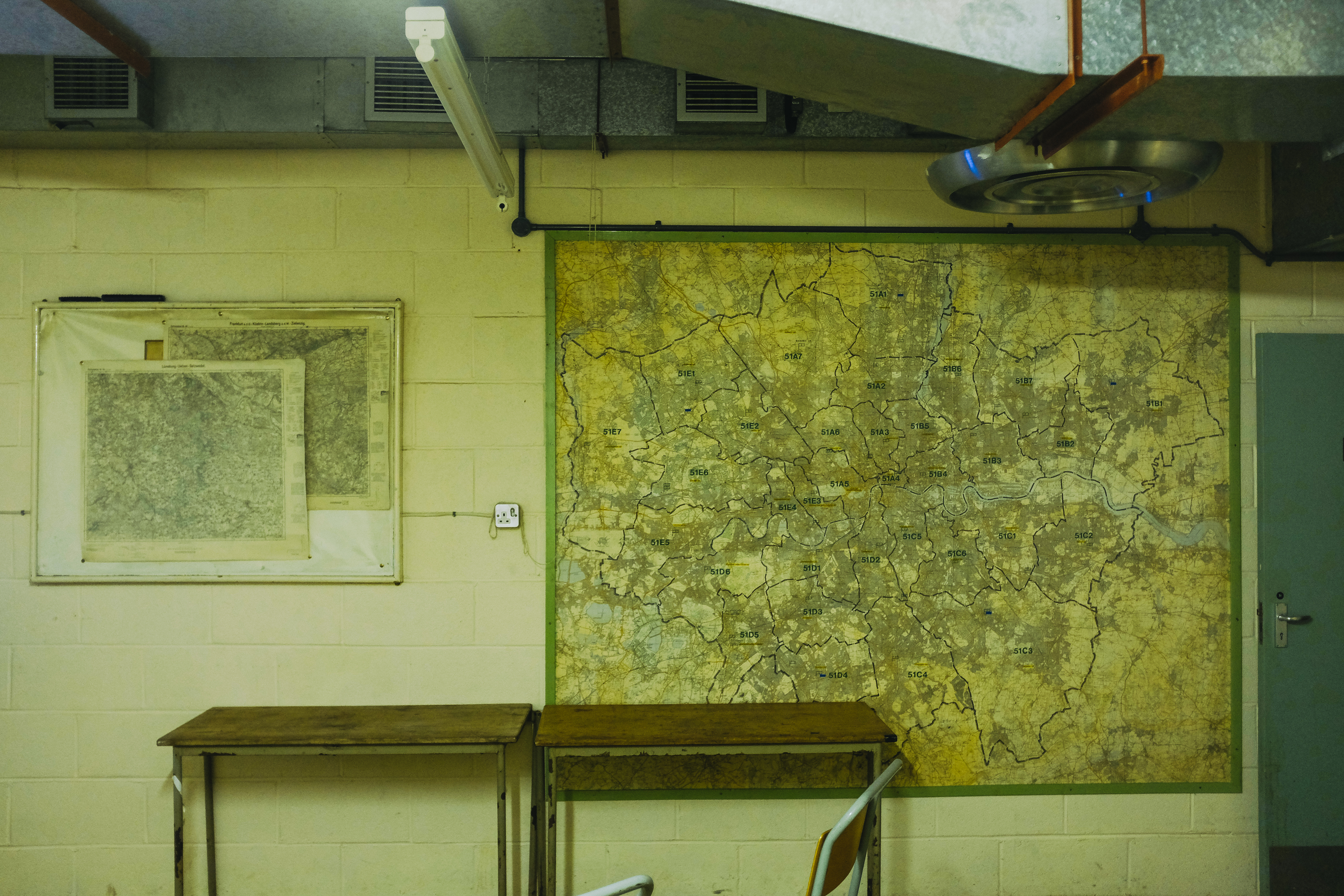

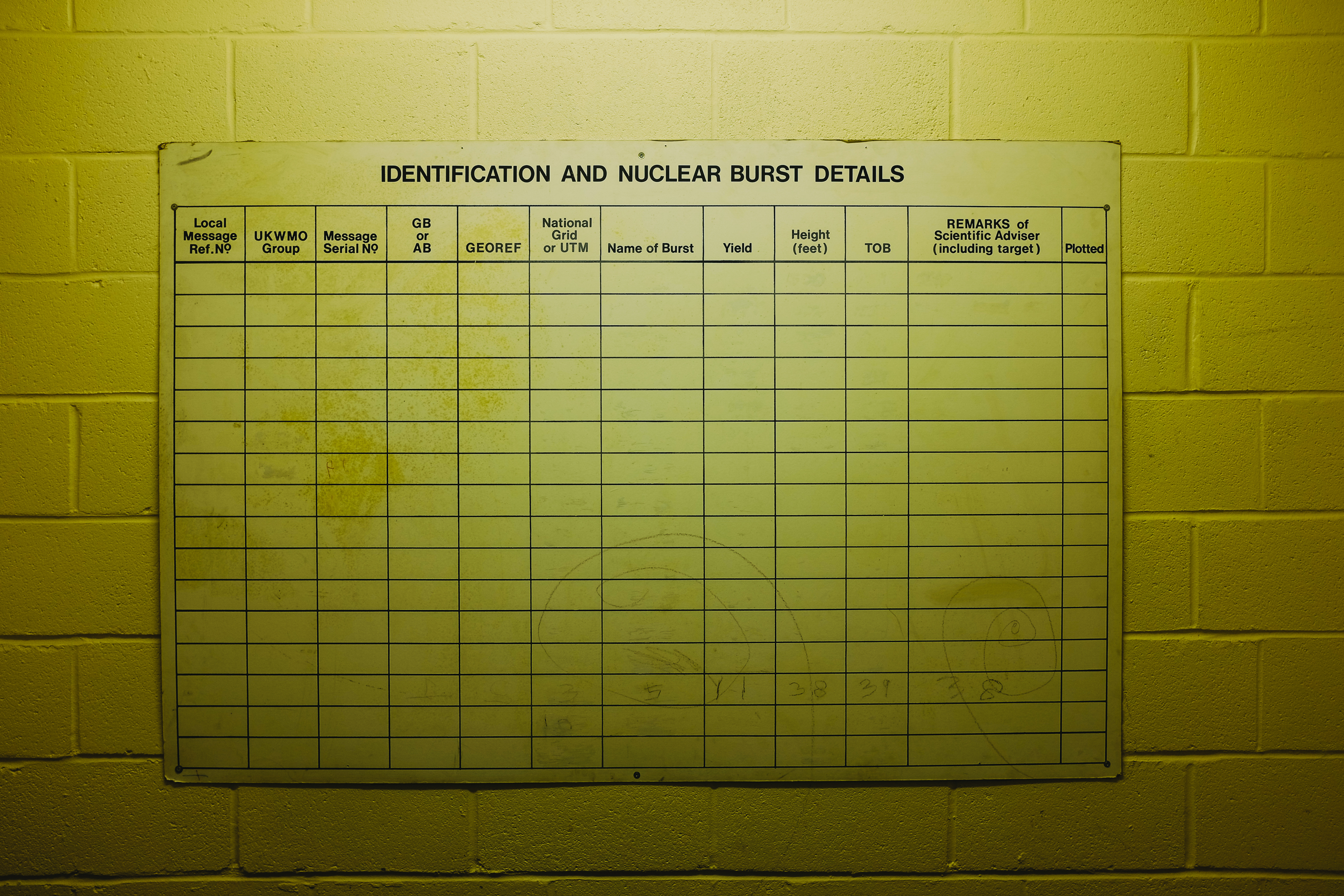

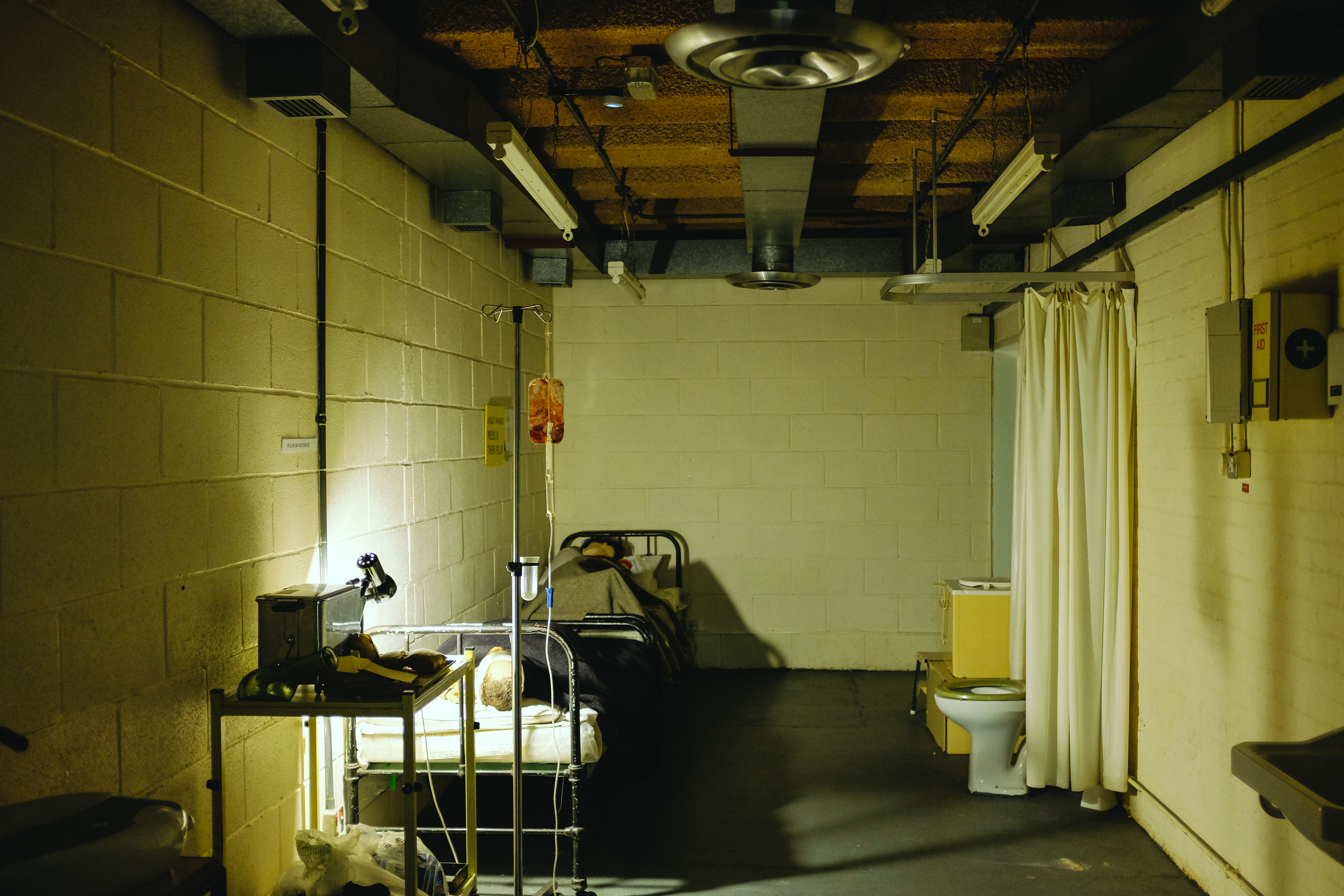

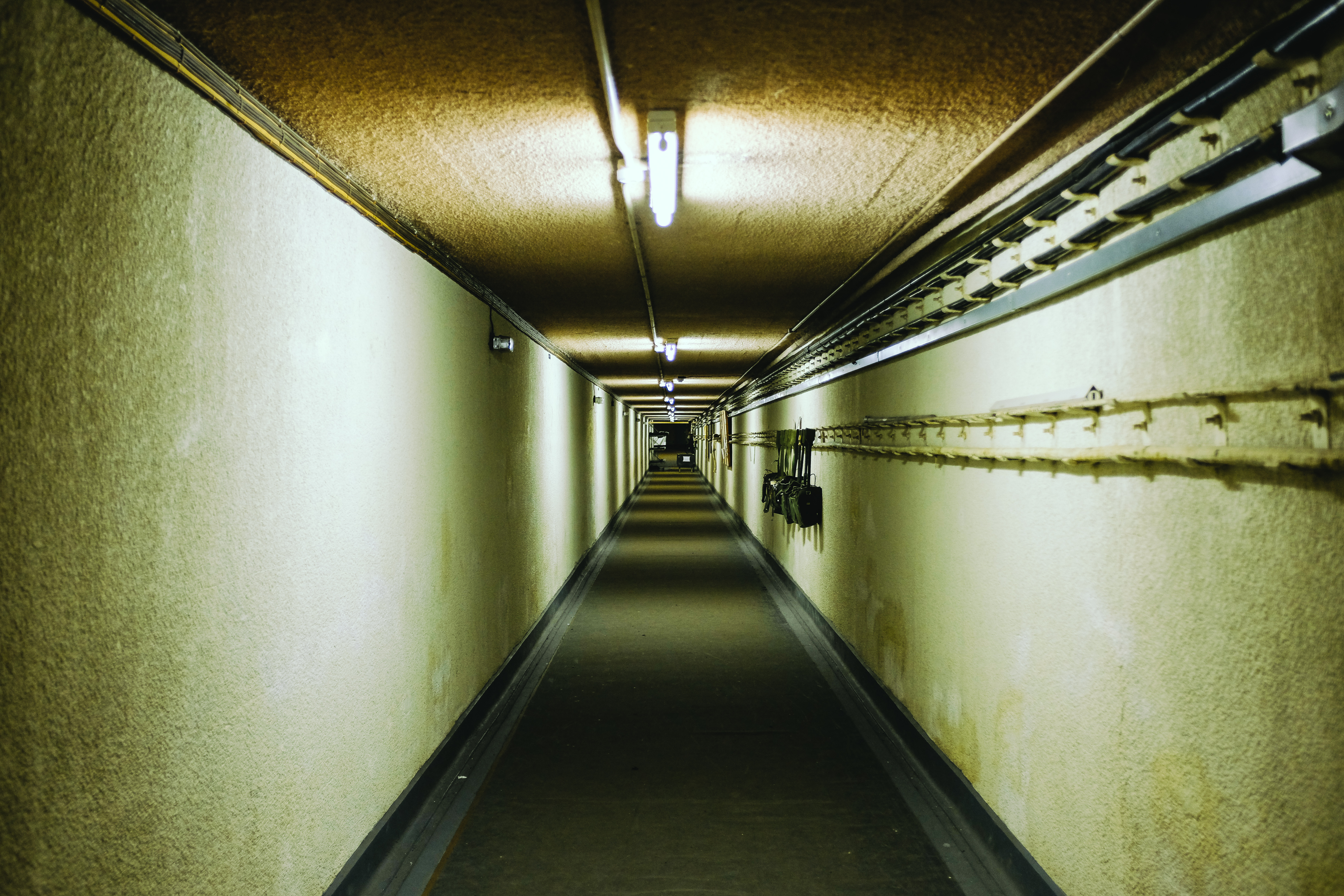

== See also ==
- Central Government War Headquarters
- Civil Contingencies Secretariat
- RAF Rudloe Manor
- Corsham Computer Centre
- Continuity of government
- Hack Green Secret Nuclear Bunker
- Wartime Broadcasting Service
