= List of established military terms =

This is a list of established military terms, meaning they have been in use for at least 50 years. Since technology and doctrine have changed over time, not all of them are in current use, or they may have been superseded by more modern terms. However, they are still in current use in articles about previous military periods. Some of them like camouflet have been adapted to describe modern versions of old techniques.

== Administrative (all arms) ==
- Access control
- Base of operation
- Cantonment: a temporary or semi-permanent military quarters; in South Asia, the term cantonment also describes permanent military stations.
- Chief of defence
- Classified information
- Cloak and Dagger
- Combat information center
- Command (military formation)
- Command center
- Command and control
- Commander-in-chief
- Command hierarchy
- Defense diplomacy
- Defence minister
- Directive control
- Force multiplication
- Force surge
- Headquarters unit
- Military facility
- Military genius - Clausewitz's attempt to identify characteristics of successful military commanders
- Logistics
- Materiel (also matériel)
- Military supply chain management
- Multi-factor authentication
- Nuclear football
- Operational level of war
- Permissive action link
- Plausible deniability
- Security clearance
- Situation room: a room in a government headquarters etc where senior high-ranking military officials in authority find out the latest information about something serious that is happening, and proceed to make decisions about what to do.
- Staff
- Staging area
- Stratocracy
- War cabinet

=== Intelligence ===
- Signals intelligence (SIGINT) and signals intelligence in modern history
  - Electronic intelligence (ELINT)
    - High-frequency direction finding (nicknamed huff-duff) is the common name for a type of radio direction finding employed especially during the two world wars.
  - Communications intelligence (COMINT)
- Human intelligence (HUMINT)
- Imagery intelligence (IMINT)
- Measurement and signature intelligence (MASINT)
- Open-source intelligence (OSINT)

=== Doctrinal ===
- Ad-hoc
- Battle management language
- COGCON
- DEFCON
- Ersatz
- Tactical formation
- Gold Codes
- LERTCON
- Multiservice tactical brevity code
- Rainbow codes
- EMERGCON
- INFOCON
- REDCON
- FPCON
- Situation awareness
- Alert state
- Combat readiness

== On land ==
- Demilitarized zone (DMZ): Area that is specifically established to be free from military presence or action. Often used to create a buffer between two conflicting states to prevent accidental border skirmishes and established by treaty or a third party peace keeper.
- No man's land: land that is not occupied or, more specifically, land that is under dispute between countries or areas that will not occupy it because of fear or uncertainty, or for tactical or strategical considerations. No man's land was what the Allied Expeditionary Force under the command of General Pershing would refer to the land separating the fronts of the two opposing armies, as it was deadly to be there.

=== Arms and services ===
- Artillery includes any engine used for the discharge of large projectiles.
- Artillery battery: an organized group of artillery pieces (previously artillery park).
- Also see below Artillery

=== Doctrinal ===
These terms are used for talking about how armed forces are used. Many of the terms below can be applied to combat in other environments although most often used in reference to land warfare.

- Ambush: carrying out a surprise attack on an enemy that passes by a concealed position.
- Artillery barrage: a line or barrier of exploding artillery shells, created by continuous and co-ordinated fire of a large number of guns.
- Battalia: an army or a subcomponent of an army such as a battalion in battle array (common military parlance in the 17th century).
- Blockade: a ring of naval vessels surrounding a specific port or even an entire nation. The goal is to halt the movement of goods which could help the blockaded nation's war effort.
- Booby trap
- Breach: a gap in fortified or battle lines.
- Breakout: exploiting a breach in enemy lines so that a large force (division or above) passes through.
- Bridgehead and its varieties known as beachheads and airheads.
- Camouflet
- Chalk: a group of paratroopers or other soldiers that deploy from a single aircraft. A chalk often corresponds to a platoon-sized unit for air assault operations, or a company-minus-sized organization for airborne operations. For air transport operations, it can consist of up to a company-plus-sized unit. Frequently, a load of paratroopers in one aircraft, prepared for a drop, is also referred to as a stick.
- Charge: a large force heads directly to an enemy to engage in close quarters combat, with the hope of breaking the enemy line.
- Chequered retreat, (retraite en échiquier, Fr.) a line or battalion, alternately retreating and facing about in the presence of an enemy, exhibiting a deployment like chequered squares
- Column: a formation of soldiers marching in files in which the files is significantly longer than the width of ranks in the formation.
- Command and control
- Counterattack
- Counter-battery fire
- Coup de grâce: a death blow intended to end the suffering of a wounded soldier; also applied to severely damaged ships (called scuttling when applied to friendly ships).
- Coup de main: a swift pre-emptive strike.
- Debellatio: to end a war by complete destruction of a hostile state. More severe than sacking.
- Decisive victory: an overwhelming victory for one side, often shifting the course of conflict.
- Defilade: a unit or position is "defiladed" if it is protected from direct exposure to enemy fire; see also Hull-down.
- DUSTOFF: a now traditional call sign for US Army Air Ambulance helicopter operations engaging in MEDEVAC.
- Echelon formation: a military formation in which members are arranged diagonally.
- Encirclement: surrounding enemy forces on all sides, isolating them.
- Enfilade: a unit (or position) is "enfiladed" when enemy fire can be directed along the long axis of the unit. For instance, a trench is enfiladed if the enemy can fire down the length of the trench. May also refer to placing a unit in a position to enfilade, or the position so enfiladed.
- Envelope
- Extraction point: the location designated for reassembly of forces and their subsequent transportation out of the battle zone.
- Fabian strategy: avoiding pitched battles in order to wear down the enemy in a war of attrition.
- Fighting withdrawal: pulling back military forces while maintaining contact with the enemy.
- File: a single column of soldiers.
- Fire in the hole
- Flanking maneuver: to attack an enemy or an enemy unit from the side, or to maneuver to do so.
- Forlorn hope: a band of soldiers or other combatants chosen to take the leading part in a military operation, such as an assault on a defended position, where the risk of casualties is high.
- Frontal assault or frontal attack: an attack toward the front of an enemy force.
- Garrison: a body of troops holding a particular location on a long-term basis.
- Ground zero
- Guerrilla tactics: attacking the enemy and the subsequent breaking off of contact and retreating; also referred to as "hit-and-run tactics".
- Hit-and-run
- Hors de combat: a unit out of the fight, surrendered, wounded (when incapacitated), and so on.
- Infantry square, pike square, or schiltron
- Infiltration
- Intent
- Interdiction: to attack and disrupt enemy supply lines.
- Killing field
- Lodgement: an enclave made by increasing the size of a bridgehead.
- Mission-type tactics
- MEDEVAC: the tactical medical evacuation of wounded from the field of battle by air, bringing them to a higher level of medical care and treatment, e.g. from a forward field location or a forward aid station to a combat support hospital, forward surgical team or other treatment facility able to provide significant stabilizing care or definitive treatment to the injured.
- Mess: A place where troops gather for their meals
- Mikes: Minutes. When used in normal vernacular speaker will say will be ready in X-Mikes where X represents number of minutes.
- Mobile columns, or movable columns (French: colomnes mobiles or troupes en activité) — in contrast to stationary troops troupes sédentaire. This may be used as a bureaucratic description to describe the function for which troops are raised for example the regiments of the Highland Fencible Corps were raised for garrison duties while Scottish line regiments in the British Army were raised to fight anywhere; or it may be an operational description.
- No quarter given: all enemy troops are to be killed, even those who surrender. Also referred to as "take no prisoners".
- Overwatch: tactical technique in which one unit is positioned in a vantage position to provide perimeter surveillance and immediate fire support for another friendly unit.
- Patrolling
- Parthian shot
- Phalanx
- Pickets (or picquets): sentries or advance troops specifically tasked with early warning of contact with the enemy. A soldier who has this job is on "picket duty", and may also be referred to as a "lookout." (see also Vedette, a mounted sentry or outpost)
- Pincer maneuver
- Pitched battle
- Pocket: see "salient".
- Pyrrhic victory: a victory paid for so dearly that it potentially could lead to a later defeat ("a battle won, a war lost").
- Raid
- Rank: a single line of soldiers.
- Reconnaissance
- Reconnoitre: to go to an area (reconnoitering) to find out information of the exact location of an enemy force.
- Retreat: withdrawal of troops from a battlefield (can be either orderly or unorderly; fighting or by rout).
- Rout: disorderly withdrawal of troops from a battlefield following a defeat, either real or perceived.
- Sack: the destruction and looting of a city, usually after an assault.
- Safe-guard: individual soldiers or detachments placed to prevent resources (often farms full of crops and livestock) from being looted or plundered
- Salients: a pocket or "bulge" in a fortified or battle line. The enemy's line facing a salient is referred to as a "re-entrant".
- Scorched earth: the deliberate destruction of resources in order to deny their use to the enemy.
- Scuttlebutt: For gossip or water fountain.
- Scuttling: the deliberate destruction of a ship to prevent its capture and use by an enemy. Commonly used as a coup de grâce, but has also been a protest (as after the First World War).
- Shield wall: the massed use of interconnected shields to form a wall in battle.
- Shield wall (fortification): the highest and thickest wall of a castle protecting the main assault approach.
- Shoot and scoot: a type of fire-and-movement tactic used by artillery to avoid counter-battery fire.
- Siege: a military blockade of a city or fortress with the intent of conquering by force or attrition, often accompanied by an assault in the later phase.
  - Siege en régle: A siege where a city or fortress is invested but no bombardment or assault takes place. Instead, the besieger attempts to persuade the defenders to surrender through negotiation, inducement, or through privations such as starvation. This may be done because the fortress is too strong for the attackers to capture through bombardment and assault, or because if the fortification when captured is undamaged it immediately becomes a functional strong point for the former besiegers.
  - Circumvallation: a line of fortifications built by the attackers around the besieged fortification facing towards it.
  - Contravallation: a second line of fortifications behind the circumvallation facing away from the enemy fort to protect the besiegers from attacks by allies of the besieged.
  - Escalade: the act of scaling defensive walls or ramparts with the aid of ladders, a prominent feature of siege warfare in medieval times.
  - Chevaux de frise: sword blades chained together to incapacitate people trying to charge into a breach in the walls.
  - Investment: surrounding an enemy fort (or town) with armed forces to prevent entry or escape.
  - Military mining, undermining of defence positions either fortifications or enemy front line trenches (see also camouflet).
  - Parallel trenches
  - Sapping: digging approach trench towards enemy fortifications within range of the besieged guns.
  - Siege engines: specialised weapons used to overcome fortifications of a besieged fort or town; in modern times, the task has fallen to large artillery pieces.
  - Siege train: specialised siege artillery moved in a column by road or by rail.
  - Siege tower: a wooden tower on wheels constructed to protect assailants and ladders while approaching the defensive walls of a fortification.
- Sortie (also "to sally (forth)"): a sudden attack against a besieging enemy from within a besieged fort or town.
- Surrender at discretion: unconditional surrender instead of surrendering with terms.
- Skirmish
- Switch position: A defensive position oblique to, and connecting, successive defensive positions paralleling the front.
- Thunder run: quick surprise penetration attack deep into enemy territory, designed to confuse and potentially break enemy lines and take a city.
- Vedette, a mounted sentry or outpost, who has the function of bringing information, giving signals or warnings of danger, etc.
- Withdrawal (military): retreat (i.e., pulling back) of troops from a battlefield (can be either orderly or unorderly; fighting or by rout)

=== Ordnance ===
These terms concern identification of means of combat to inflict damage on the opponent.

==== Edged ====
Weapons that inflict damage through cutting or stabbing.

- Bayonet
- Bill (weapon)
- Danish axe
- Halberd
- Hands
- Knife or Dagger
- Lance
- Polearm or poleaxe
- Pike (weapon)
- Partisan (weapon)
- Sabre
- Spear
- Sword

==== Projectile munitions ====
Projectiles are weapons and ordnance that inflict damage through impact.

===== Individual =====
- Bow (weapon)
- Crossbow
- Sling (weapon) and slingshot (hand catapult)

Firearms

- Carbine
- Machine gun
- Musket
- Pistol
- Revolver
- Rifle
- Shotgun
- Submachine gun

===== Artillery =====
Crew-served, non-vehicle mounted weapons

- Ballista
- Catapult
- Mangonel
- Onager (siege weapon)
- Trebuchet

Guns

- Bombard (weapon)
- Cannon
  - Autocannon
  - Basilisk
  - Bombard
  - Carronade
  - Culverin
  - Demi-cannon
  - Demi-culverin
  - Falconet
  - Hand cannon
  - Minion
  - Saker
- Gun
  - Field gun
  - Naval artillery
- Howitzer
- Mortar (weapon)

==== Explosives ====
Explosive ordnance causes damage through release of chemical energy.

- Artillery shell
- Bangalore torpedo
- Camouflet
- Grenade
  - Hand grenade
  - Rifle grenade (see also Grenade launcher)
  - Rocket propelled grenade
- Land mine
  - Anti-tank mine
  - Anti-personnel mine

==== Incendiary ====
Incendiary ordnance causes damage through release of heat.

- Flamethrower
- Greek fire
- Napalm
- White phosphorus

=== Vehicles ===
- Armoured car
- Chariot
- Half-track
- Armoured personnel carrier
- Tank
- Tank destroyer

=== Engineering ===
See also List of fortifications

- Abatis: a defensive obstacle consisting of an obstacle formed (in the modern era) of the branches of trees laid in a row.
- Banquette, or fire step
- Barbed wire
- Bartizan: a cylindrical turret or sentry post projecting beyond the parapet of a fort or castle
- Bastion
- Bastion fortress: a star-shaped fortress surrounding a town or city (also known as star fort or Trace italienne).
- Battery: an artillery position, which may be fortified.
- Berm
- Blast wall: a barrier for protection from high explosive blast.
- Blockhouse: a) Medieval and Renaissance - a small artillery tower, b) 18th and 19th centuries - a small colonial wooden fort, c) 20th century - a large concrete defensive structure.
- Breastwork
- Bulwark
- Bunker: a heavily fortified, mainly underground, facility used as a defensive position; also commonly used as command centres for high-level officers.
- Caponier: a defensive firing position either projecting into, or traversing the ditch of a fort.
- Carnot wall: a wall pierced with loopholes, sited above the scarp of a ditch but below the rampart.
- Casemate: a vaulted chamber for protected storage, accommodation or if provided with an embrasure, for artillery
- Castle
  - Medieval fortification
    - Arrow slit (arrow loop, loophole)
    - Barbican
    - Chemin de ronde
    - Concentric castle
    - Drawbridge
    - Gatehouse
    - Keep or donjon
    - Moat
    - Machicolation
    - Murder-hole
    - Portcullis
- Citadel
- Counterscarp: the opposing side of a ditch in front of a fortification, i.e., the side facing it.
- Counterscarp gallery: a firing position built into the counterscarp wall of the ditch.
- Counter mine: anti-siege tunnel dug by a fortification's defenders below an attacker's mine with the intent of destroying it before the attackers are able to damage (the foundations of) the fortification's walls.
- Coupure
- Covertway
- Defensive fighting position; for example, a rifle pit, sangar or fox hole.
- Demi-lune
- Ditch: a dry moat.
- Dragon's teeth: Triangular obstacles acting as roadblocks for armoured vehicles.
- Dutch Water Line: a series of water-based defensive measures designed to flood large areas in case of attack.
- Earthworks
- Embrasure: an opening in a parapet or casemate, for a gun to fire through.
- Fascine is a bundle of sticks or similar, were used in military defences for revetting (shoring up) trenches or ramparts, especially around artillery batteries, or filling in ditches and trenches during an attack.
- Flèche: an arrow shaped outwork, smaller than a ravelin or a lunette, with 2 faces with a parapet and an open gorge
- Fort
- Fortification
- Fortress
- Gabion: a large basket filled with earth, used to form a temporary parapet for artillery
- Glacis: a bank of earth sloping away from the fort, to protect it from direct artillery fire
- Gorge: opening at the rear of an outwork for access by defending troops from the main defensive position
- Hill fort (New Zealand: Pa (Māori))
- Lunette: an outwork consisting of a salient angle with two flanks and an open gorge.
- Magazine: a protected place within a fort, where ammunition is stored and prepared for use.
- Mining: a siege method used since antiquity against a walled city, fortress or castle, where tunnels are dug to undermine the foundations of the walls; also see counter-mine.
- Outwork: a minor defence, built or established outside the principal fortification limits, detached or semidetached.
- Parapet: a wall at the edge of the rampart to protect the defenders.
- Pillbox: a small concrete guard post.
- Polygonal fort: a later type of fort without bastions.
- Rampart: The main defensive wall of a fortification.
- Ravelin: a triangular fortification in front of bastion as a detached outwork.
- Redan: a V-shaped salient angle toward an expected attack, made from earthworks or other material.
- Redoubt: a fort or fort system usually consisting of an enclosed defensive emplacement outside a larger fort, which can be constructed of earthworks, stone or brick.
- Reduit: an enclosed defensive emplacement inside a larger fort; provides protection during a persistent attack.
- Sangar: a small temporary fortified position with a breastwork originally of stone, but built of sandbags and similar materials in modern times.
- Sally port
- Sapping
- Scarp: the side of a ditch in front of a fortification facing away from it.
- Sconce: a small protective fortification, such as an earthwork, often placed on a mound as a defensive work for artillery.
- Sea fort: a coastal fort entirely surrounded by the sea, either built on a rock or directly onto the sea bed.
- Slighting: the deliberate destruction of an (abandoned) fortification without opposition from its (former) occupants and/or defenders.
- Sortie
- Star fort: a star-shaped fortress surrounding a town or city (also known as Bastion fortress or Trace italienne).
- Team room:
- Tenaille (archaic Tenalia): an advanced pincer-shaped defensive work in front of the main defences of a fortress.
- Terreplein: the fighting platform on top of a rampart, behind the parapet.
- Tête-de-pont: a temporary defensive work defending a bridge at the end closest to the enemy.
- Trace italienne: a star-shaped fortress surrounding a town or city (also known as Bastion fortress or star fort).
- Trench

=== Geographic ===
- Defile: a geographic term for a narrow pass or gorge between mountains. It has its origins as a military description of a pass through which troops can march only in a narrow column or with a narrow front.
- Debouch:
  - To emerge from a defile or similar into open country;
  - A fortification at the end of a defile;
  - Water that flows out of a defile into a wider place such as a lake.
- Choke point

== Naval ==
=== Arms and services ===
These terms concern combat arms and supporting services of armed forces used in naval warfare.

- Strike package

=== Doctrinal ===
These terms concern the type of use of naval armed forces.

- Blockade
- Coup de grâce: a final shot intended to finish off a sinking (enemy) ship (which should be distinguished from scuttling).
- Crossing the Tee
- Conn
- Vanguard—the leading part of an advancing military formation
- Line astern, line ahead, or line of battle
- Over-the-beach capability
- Raking fire
- Scuttling
- Weather gage

=== Operational ===
- Adrift: Loose and out of control. Typically applied to a ship or vessel that has lost power and is unable to control its movement.
- Aft: Any part of the ship closer to the stern than you currently are.
- All Hands: The entire ship's crew to include all officers and enlisted.
- Aye, Aye: Response acknowledging and understanding a command.
- Bow: Front of the ship.
- Below: Any deck beneath the one you are currently on.
- Burner, Burner Go (US): Afterburner on full power.
- Carry on: An order given to continue work or duties. Also refers to when played by the Boatswain's call.
- Cast off: To throw off, to let go, to unfurl.
- Colours: Raising and lowering of the National Ensign, the National flag, and organization flags.
- Fathom: Unit of measurement generally used for depth from sea level to sea floor.
- General Quarters: Battle stations. Generally set when the ship is about to engage in battle or hostile activities.
- Helocasting:
- Jettison: To throw or dispose of something over the side of the ship.
- Ladder: Also known as a ladder well. Much like civilian stairs, however much steeper.
- Leave: Vacation time nearly completely free unless an emergency recall occurs.
- Shore leave or Liberty (US): Permission to leave the ship/base to enjoy non-work activities.
- Maritime Insertion:
- Mid-watch (US) / Middle (UK): The midnight to 0400 watch. Also known as "balls to four" due to military time equivalent 0000-0400. (0001 to 0400 - UK)
- Needle alive: Airspeed indicator showing increasing speed.
- Port Side: Left hand side of the ship when facing towards the bow.
- Quarters: Generally the morning assembly of all hands for muster and accountability.
- Starboard: Right hand side of the ship when facing towards the bow.
- Ready 5/Alert 5 (US): Aircraft on standby on flight deck ready to be launched in 5 minutes or less.
- Ready room: Room on an aircraft carrier where aircrew conduct much of their pre-flight and post-flight briefs.
- Round Down: The stern of the Carrier where the Flight Deck Started.
- Smoke in the air: Used by Naval Aviators/Aircrew for locked-on incoming missiles at visual range.
- Sea skimming: Low level flight procedure for missiles/fighter aircraft to avoid radar detection.
- Stern: Rear of the ship.
- Taps: Lights out, time to sleep.
- Turn to: Start working.
- Working Aloft: Working above the highest deck, generally performing maintenance on the ship's mast or antennas.

=== Ordnance ===
- Naval artillery
- Sea mine
- Powerhead
- Speargun
- Supercavitating ammunition
- Supercavitating torpedo
- Torpedo
- Turret
- Underwater firearm

=== Vessels ===
- Aircraft carrier
- Helicopter carrier
- Escort carrier
- Fleet carrier
- Light carrier
- Fighter catapult ship
- Catapult aircraft merchant ship
- Merchant aircraft carrier
- Aircraft maintenance carrier
- Interdiction assault ship
- Flagship
- Special service ship
- Troopship
- Ship's tender
- Attack transport
- Battlecarrier
- Battleship
- Dreadnought
- Pocket battleship
- Seaplane tender
- Sloop
- Battlecruiser
- Cruiser
- Heavy cruiser
- Armored cruiser
- Light cruiser
- Scout cruiser
- Strike cruiser
- Destroyer
- Destroyer escort
- Destroyer flotilla leader
- Destroyer depot ship
- Frigate
- Corvette
- Aerodynamically alleviated marine vehicle
- Ground-effect vehicle
- Hovercraft
- Landing Craft Air Cushion
- Landing craft depot ship
- Merchant cruiser
- Stealth ship
- Surface effect ship
- Submarine
- Submarine tender
- Midget submarine
- Cruiser submarine
- Hunter-killer submarine
- Ballistic missile submarine
- Guided missile submarine
- Submarine chaser
- Submarine aircraft carrier
- Torpedo boat
- Amphibious command ship
- Amphibious assault ship
- Amphibious transport dock
- Dock landing ship
- Expeditionary transfer dock
- Littoral combat ship
- Coastal defence ship
- Barracks ship
- Mexeflote
- Rhino ferry
- Patrol boat
- Research vessel
- Survey ship
- Dry dock
- Torpedo trials craft
- Guard ship
- Cable layer
- Cable repair ship
- Cargo ship
- Attack cargo ship
- Vehicle cargo ship
- Dry cargo ship
- Replenishment oiler
- Oil tanker
- Maritime prepositioning ship
- Offshore supply ship
- Container ship
- Hospital ship
- Fast combat support ship
- Expeditionary fast transport
- Salvage ship
- Instrumentation ship
- Fleet ocean tug
- Riverine command ship
- Special operations insertion ship
- High-speed transport
- Maritime security cutter
- Medium endurance cutter
- High endurance cutter
- Fast response cutter
- Marine protector
- Landing ship
- Tank landing ship
- Icebreaker
- Heavy icebreaker
- Inland construction tender
- Seagoing buoy tender
- Coastal buoy tender
- Logistic support ship
- Arsenal ship
- Floating battery
- Training ship
- Minelayer
- Mine countermeasures vessel
- Minesweeper
- Gunboat
- Riverine gunboat
- Dock landing ship
- Monitor
- Breastwork monitor
- Riverine monitor
- Technical research ship
- Self defense test ship
- Self-propelled radar station
- Fast sea frame
- Crane ship
- Aviation logistics support ship
- Moored training ship
- Naval trawler

=== Engineering ===
- Air cavity system
- Electrohydrodynamics
- Internal drive propulsion
- Magnetohydrodynamic drive
- Pump-jet
- Supercavitation
- Supercavitating propeller

== Air ==
=== Arms and services ===
These terms concern combat arms and supporting services of armed forces used in air warfare.

- Flight (military unit)

=== Operational ===
- Airspeed alive: Airspeed indicator showing increasing speed.
- Smoke in the air: used by pilots/aircrew for locked-on incoming missiles at visual range.
- Sortie: used by air forces to indicate an aircraft mission count (flew seven sorties) or in the sense of a departure (the aircraft sortied).
- Squadron hack

=== Doctrinal ===
These terms concern the type of use of aviation armed forces.

- Aircraft marshalling

=== Tactics ===
- Aerial ramming
- Bombing: specifically area bombing, carpet bombing and pattern bombing.
- Glider snatch pick-up
- Sortie: a mission flown by an aircraft

=== Ordnance ===
- Bomb
- Missile

=== Aircraft ===
- Airship
- Attacker
- Bomber
- Dirigible, balloon
- Fighter
- Fighter bomber
- Spotter plane
- Stealth aircraft
- Strike aircraft

=== Engineering ===
- Hardened personnel shelter

== Space ==
=== Arms and services ===
- Space corps
- Space force

=== Doctrinal ===
- Strategic Defense Initiative

== See also ==
- Glossary of German military terms
- Glossary of military abbreviations
- List of NATO country codes
- List of British ordnance terms
- List of equipment used in World War II
- List of slang terms for federal agents
- List of government and military acronyms
- List of military slang terms
- List of military tactics
- List of World War II electronic warfare equipment
- List of U.S. security clearance terms
- List of aviation, avionics, aerospace and aeronautical abbreviations
- List of aviation mnemonics
