= Sconce (fortification) =

Type of fortification

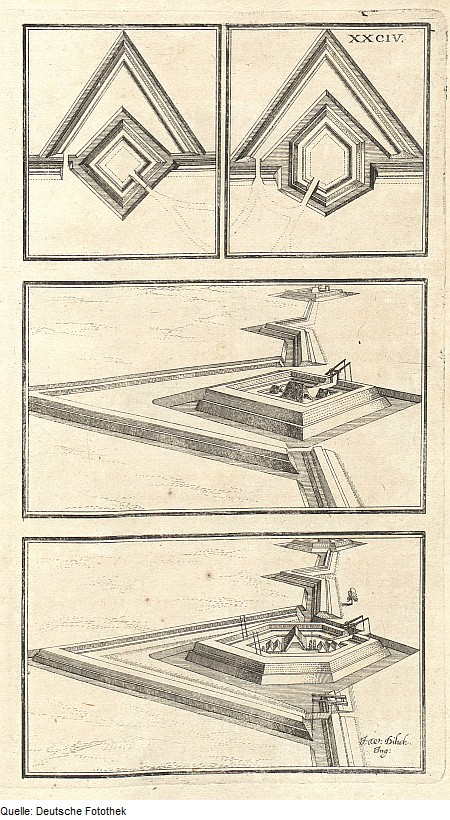
Sconces in the shape of an enclosed redoubt; here shown as incorporated into a verschanzten Linie or "fortified line". The schanze is additionally protected in this example by a couvreface.

A sconce or schanze (German: [ˈʃantsə]) is a protective fortification, such as an earthwork, often placed on a mound as a defensive work for artillery, It was used primarily in Northern Europe from the late Middle Ages until the 19th century. This type of fortification was common during the English Civil War, and the remains of one such structure can be seen on Fort Royal Hill in Worcester, England.

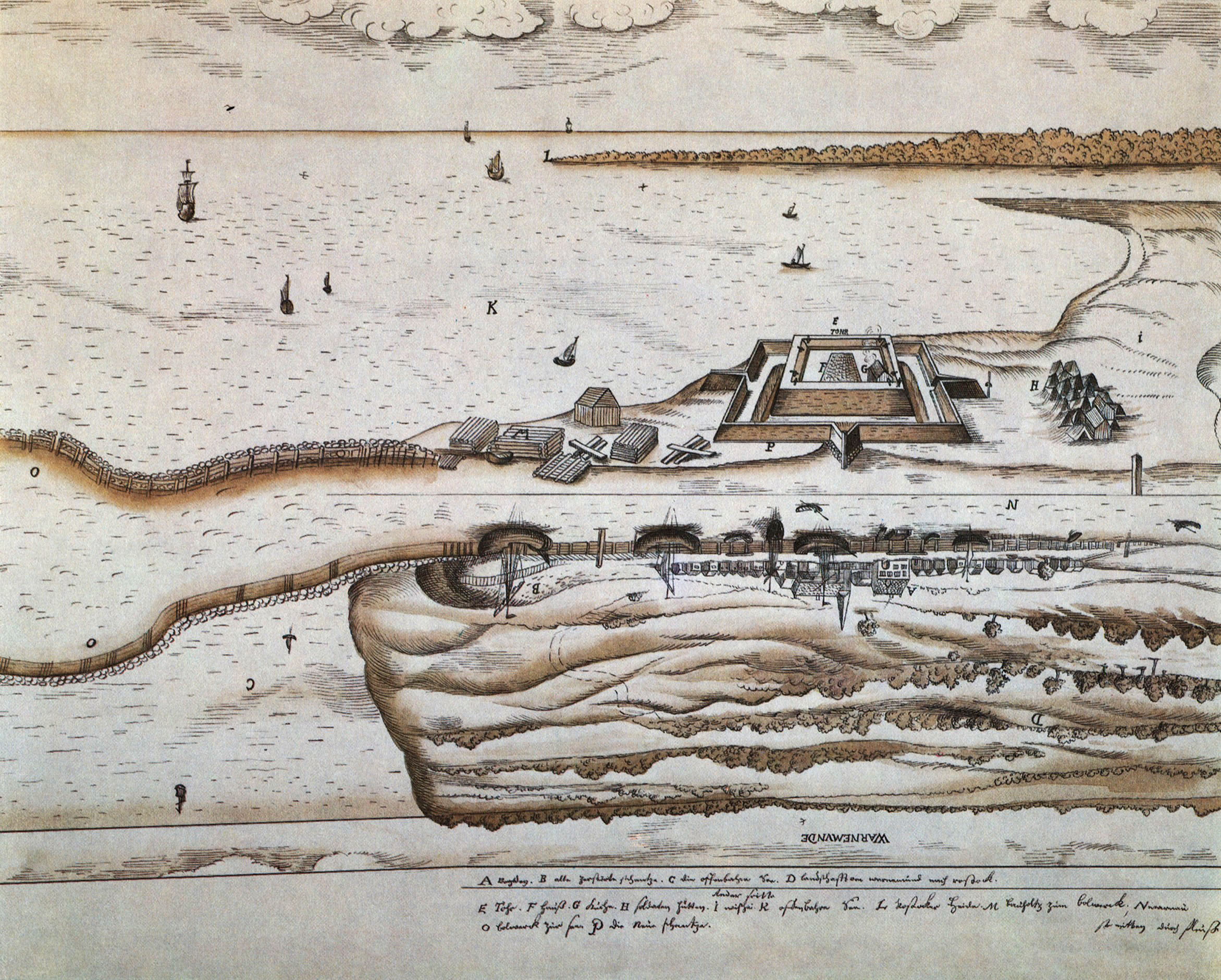
Sconce built at Warnemünde, Rostock in 1661 (detail from a map from 1670–1680)

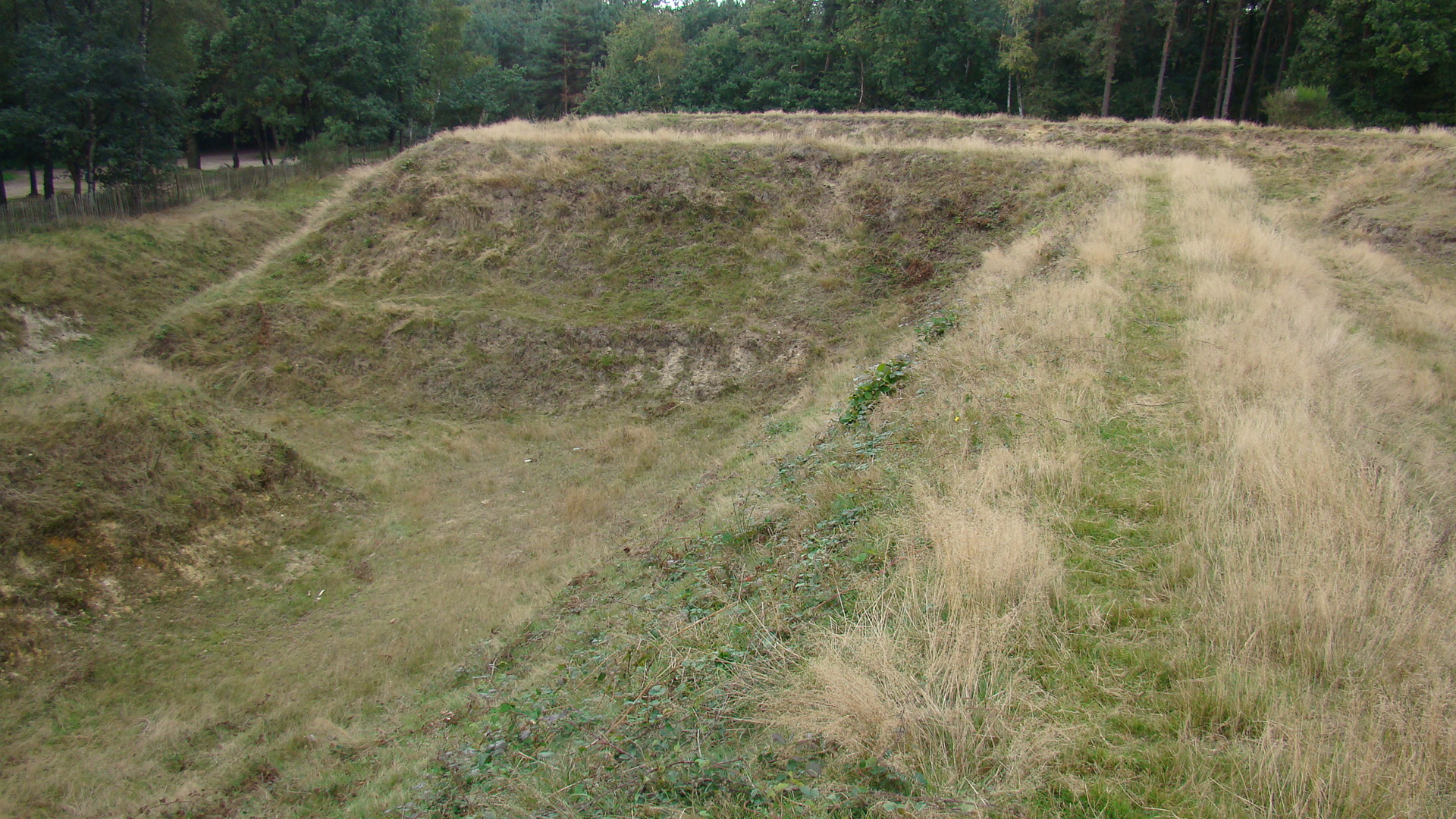
The Engelse Schans (English Sconce) of 1627 in Lievelde, the Netherlands (photo 2008)

During the Eighty Years' War for Dutch independence, the sconces (schans in Dutch) were often used to defend strategic places, but were used also during sieges and in circumvallations. Several more or less intact sconces remain in the Netherlands.

== Etymology ==
The etymology of sconce is from the Latin absconsus, via the French esconce: a word of many meanings, mostly signifying a covering or protection, or, by extension, that which is covered or protected.

The word is closely related to the medieval Dutch schans and the German word Schanze, as used for example in the name of Hitler's military headquarters, the Wolfsschanze. The word Schanze derives originally from the fact that, during sieges in the Late Middle Ages, temporary defensive positions had frequently been built out of gabions, known in German as Schanzkörbe. Later such Schanzen very often consisted of earthen ramparts. As a result, in the 16th century, the verb schanzen became generally associated with earthworks of all kinds. In modern German military use, Schanzen is still used to mean the construction of smaller earthworks, especially of fire trenches. From this already derived usage comes the phrase sich verschanzen, "to entrench oneself" in yet another derivative sense. In everyday German speech, however, it is commonplace to refer to permanent fortifications as Schanzen, because in many places in times of war, fieldworks that were only temporarily thrown up were later turned into permanent fortifications.

== As defensive systems ==
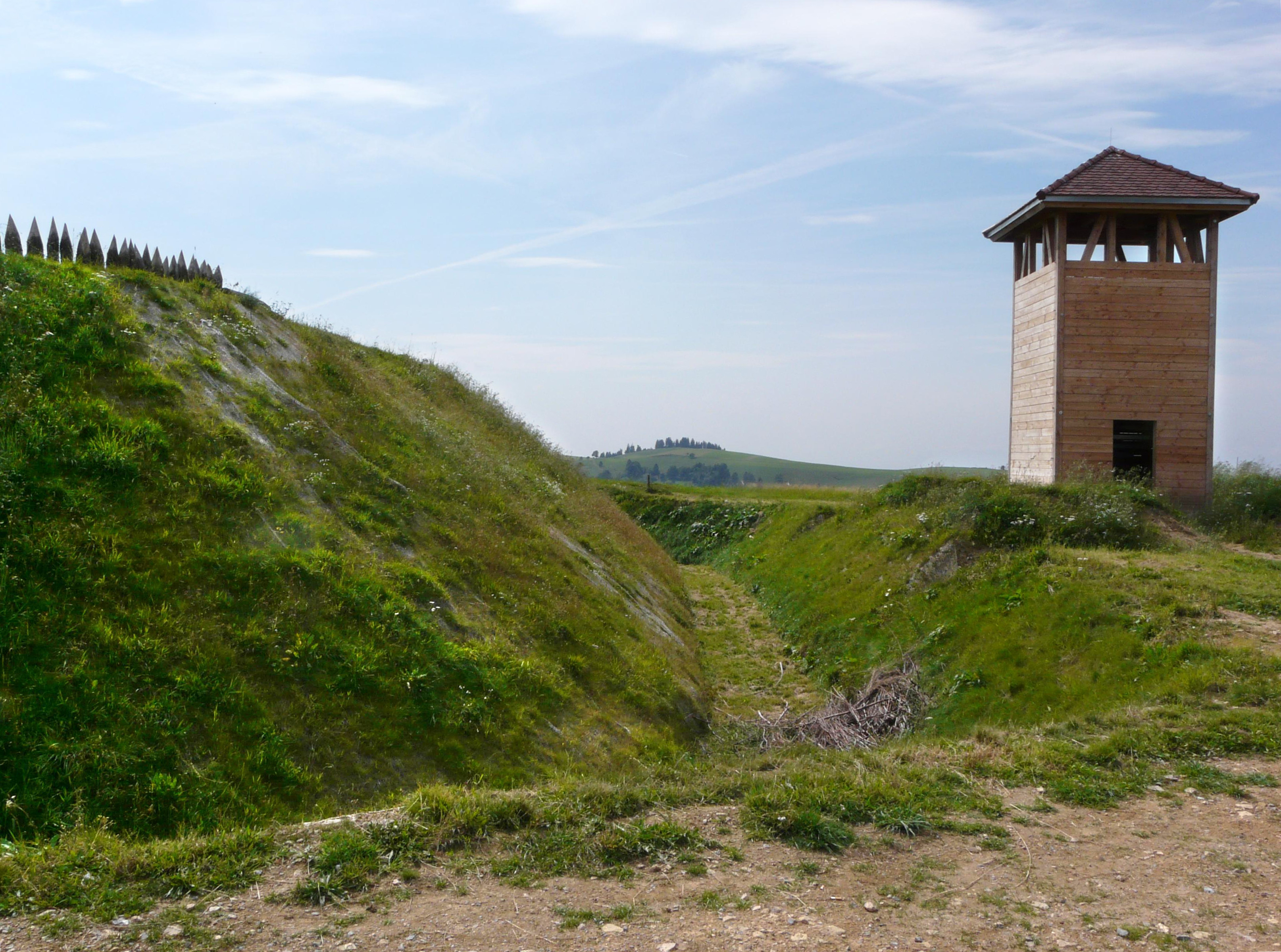
Replica of a Baroque schanze as a redoubt with chartaque in Gersbach

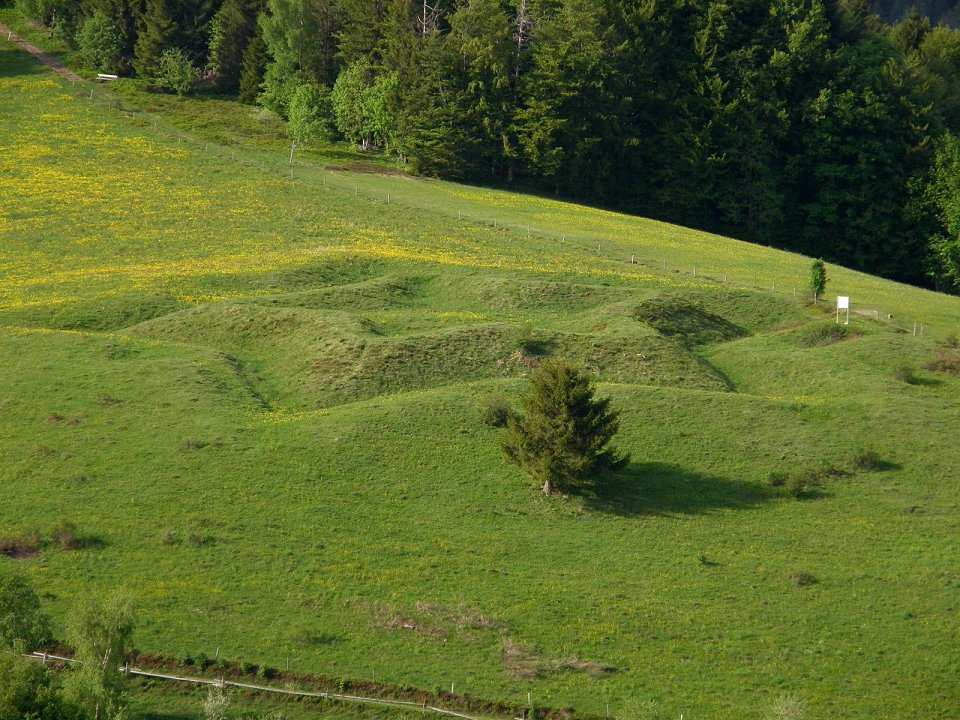
Original Baroque schanze in the form of a star at the Böllner Eck near Neuenweg, Baden-Württemberg, Germany

As a rule a schanze is an independent fortified work. To block a valley or a pass, however, a line of adjacent sconces could be erected, not infrequently connected by a low rampart and ditch. In this case it is referred to as a verschanzte Linie – a fortified line of sconces. If such a defensive line completely enclosed an area on all sides, it was described as a verschanztes Lager – a fortified position. It was not uncommon in the 17th and 18th centuries for weaker armies to construct such works in order to protect themselves from a stronger foe. During sieges fortified lines of sconces were often used as lines of contravallation or circumvallation.

Depending on the layout, a distinction is made between "open" (offene) and "closed" (geschlossene) sconces. The closed type are further divided into redoubts, that only have outward-facing angles, and "star sconces" (Sternschanzen) with alternating inward and outward facing corners. In open sconces, which may take the shape of a flèche, redan, half-redoubt, lunette, hornwork or even more complex designs, the gorge is open, i.e. the side where the army was encamped or on which their own defences lay, was unfortified.

== In popular culture ==
There is a very extensive system of sconces in the Black Forest, elements of which have survived. See Baroque fortifications in the Black Forest. Another famous schanze is the Wolf's Lair (Wolfsschanze) located near the town of Rastenburg in the north-eastern part of Poland. This military installation was Adolf Hitler's command headquarters from which he commanded Operation Barbarossa.

The Zaanse Schans, one of the top tourist locations in the Netherlands, derived its name from its original function as a sconce. Sconces played a major part in the Serbian Revolution, countering the numerical superiority of the Turkish army. Most notable cases are the battles at Mišar, Deligrad and Čegar.

== See also ==
- List of established military terms
- Baroque Schanzen
- Redoubt
- Skansen
