= Curtain wall (fortification) =

Defensive wall between two bastions of a fortification

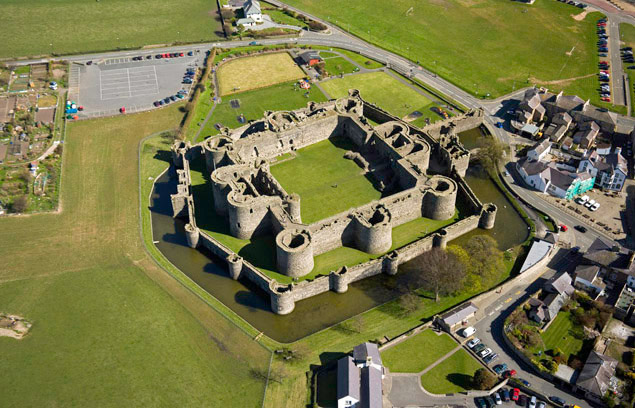
Beaumaris Castle in Anglesey in North Wales, with curtain walls between the lower outer towers, and higher inner curtain walls between the higher inner towers.

A curtain wall is a defensive wall between fortified towers or bastions of a castle, fortress, or town.

== Ancient fortifications ==
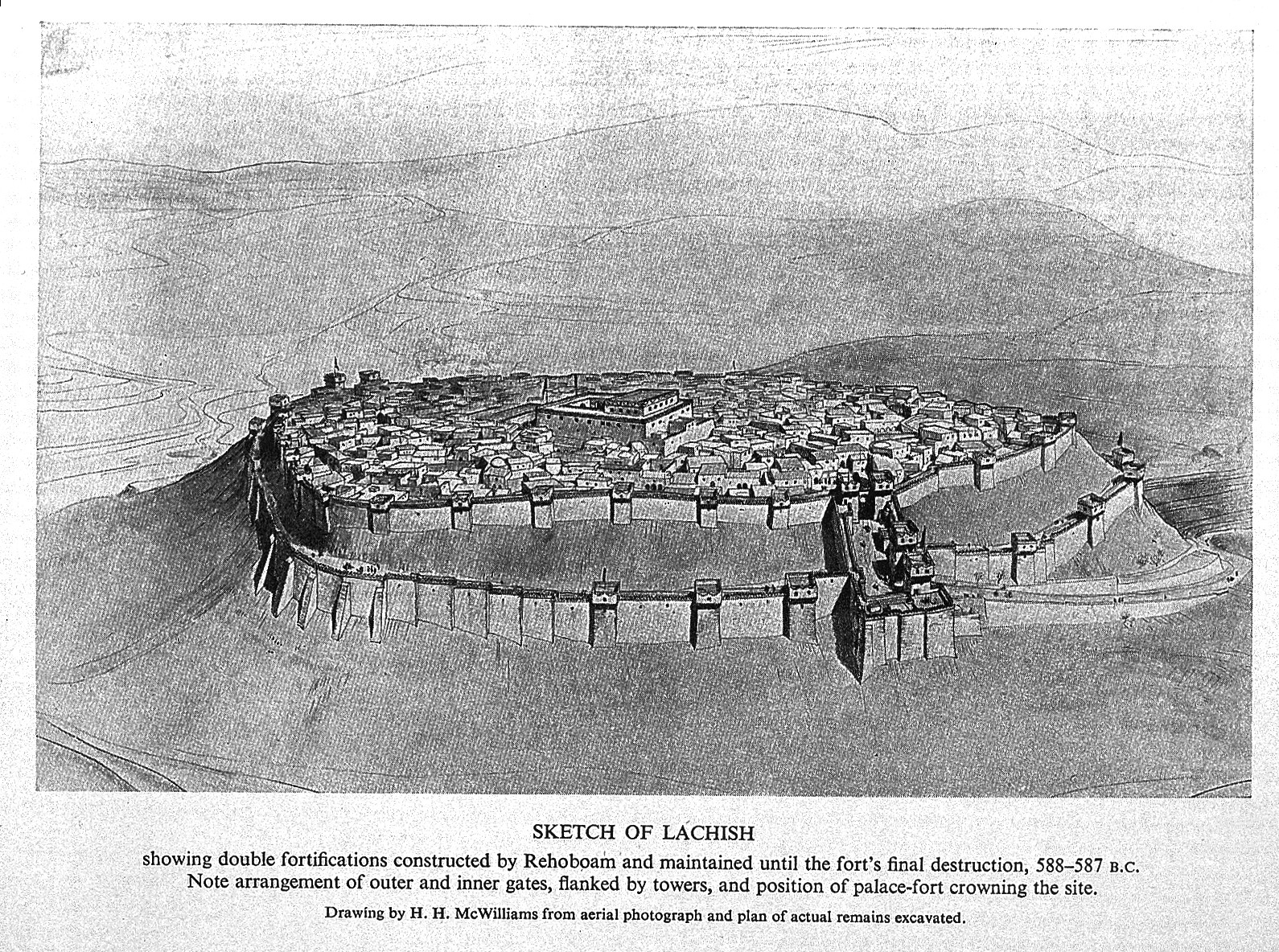
Reconstruction of the 9th-century BC defensive walls around ancient Tel Lachish in modern Israel.

Evidence for curtain walls or a series of walls surrounding a town or fortress can be found in the historical sources from Assyria and Egypt. Some notable examples are ancient Tel Lachish in Israel and Buhen in Egypt. Curtain walls were built across Europe during the Roman Empire; the early 5th century Theodosian Walls of Constantinople influenced the builders of medieval castles many centuries later.

== Curtain wall castles ==
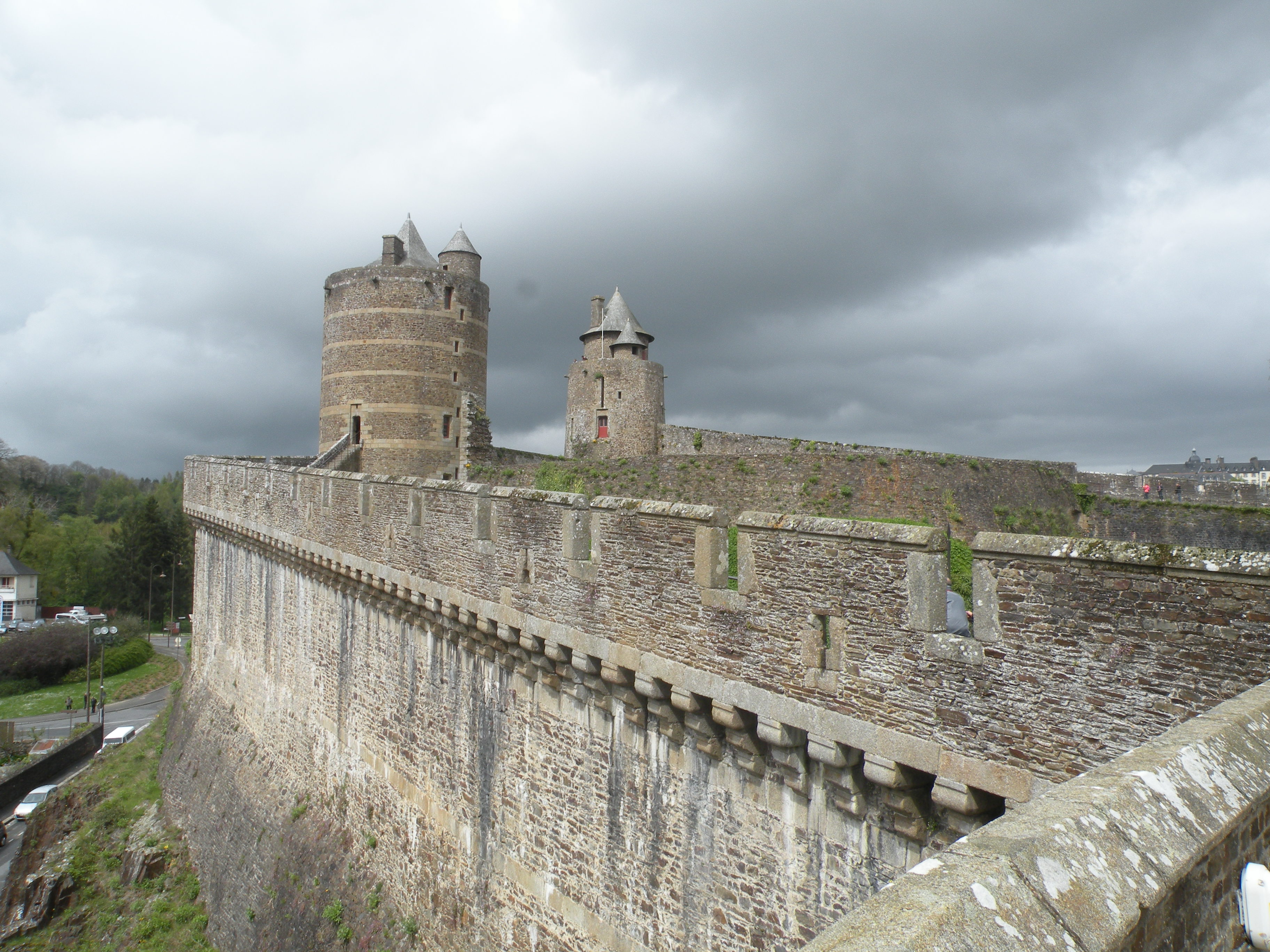
The 12th-century curtain wall of the Château de Fougères in Brittany in northern France, showing the battlements, arrowslits and overhanging machicolations.

In medieval castles, the area surrounded by a curtain wall, with or without towers, is known as the bailey. The outermost walls with their integrated bastions and wall towers together make up the enceinte or main defensive line enclosing the site.

In medieval designs of castle and town, the curtain walls were often built to a considerable height and were fronted by a ditch or moat to make assault difficult. Walls were topped with battlements which consisted of a parapet, which was generally crenellated with merlons to protect the defenders and lower crenels or embrasures which allowed them to shoot from behind cover; merlons were sometimes pierced by loopholes or arrowslits for better protection. Behind the parapet was a wall walk from which the defenders could fight or move from one part of the castle to another. Larger curtain walls were provided with mural passages or galleries built into the thickness of the walls and provided with arrowslits. If an enemy reached the foot of the wall, they became difficult to see or shoot at directly, so some walls were fitted with a projecting wooden platform called a hoarding or brattice. Stone machicolations performed a similar function.

== Early modern fortifications ==
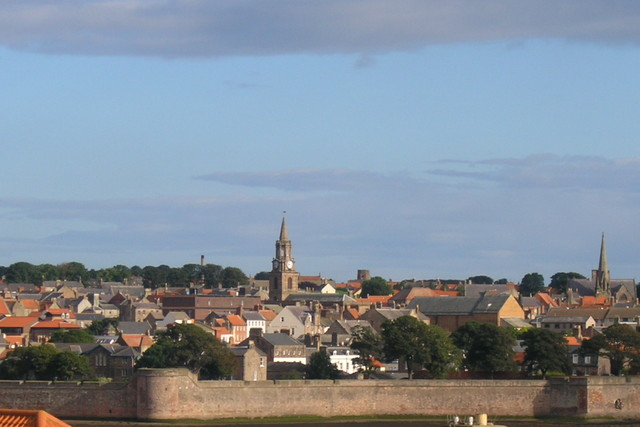
Two sections of the 16th-century curtain wall around Berwick-upon-Tweed, at the eastern end of the Anglo-Scottish border.

The introduction of gunpowder made tall castle walls vulnerable to fire from heavy cannon, which prompted the trace italienne style from the 16th century. In these fortifications, the height of the curtain walls was reduced, and beyond the ditch, additional outworks such as ravelins and tenailles were added to protect the curtain walls from direct cannonading.

== See also ==
- Bawn
- Enceinte
- Rampart
