= Banquette =

Footpath inside a rampart or parapet

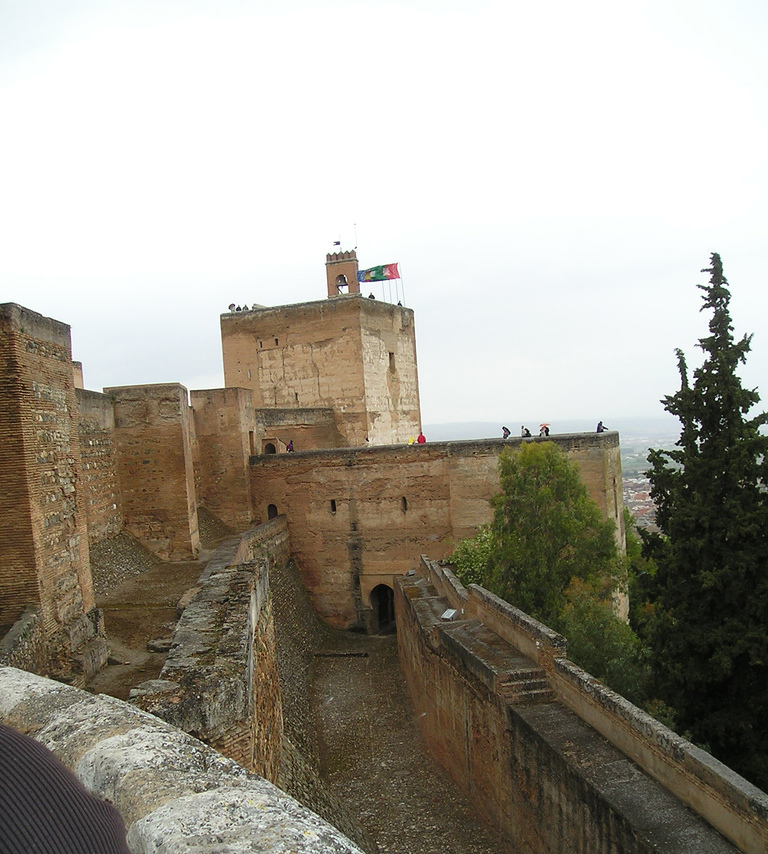
Banquette (along the wall on the right) on the Alhambra fortress in Spain.

A banquette (French pronunciation: [bɑ̃kɛt]), rampart walk or parapet walk is a small footpath or elevated step along the inside of a rampart or parapet of a fortification. Musketeers atop it were able to view the counterscarp, or fire on enemies in the moat. Typically they are around a foot and a half (half a metre) high, and almost three feet (approximately 90 cm) wide.

== See also ==
- Chemin de ronde
- List of established military terms
