= Bagration flèches =

Historic field fortifications near Borodino, Moscow Oblast, Russia

Coordinates: 55°30′18″N 35°49′41″E

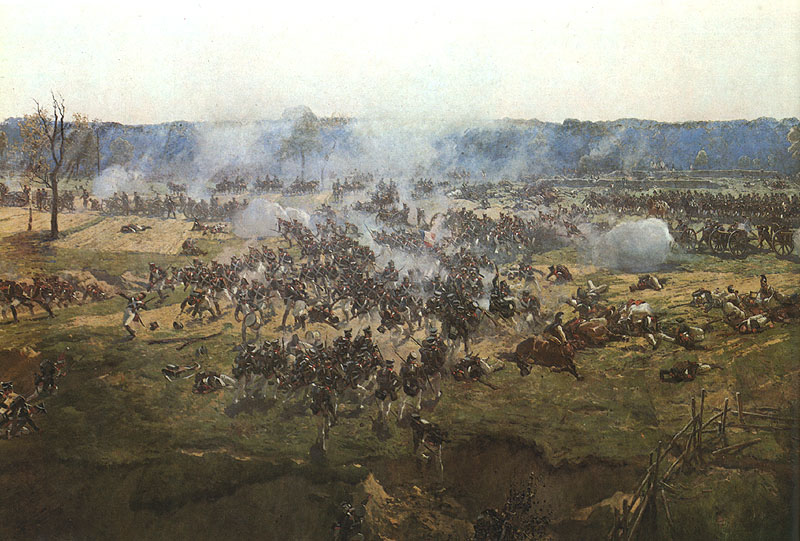
Fight for the Bagration flèches, fragment of the Borodino battle panoramic painting by Franz Roubaud. The fortifications themselves appear on the far right.

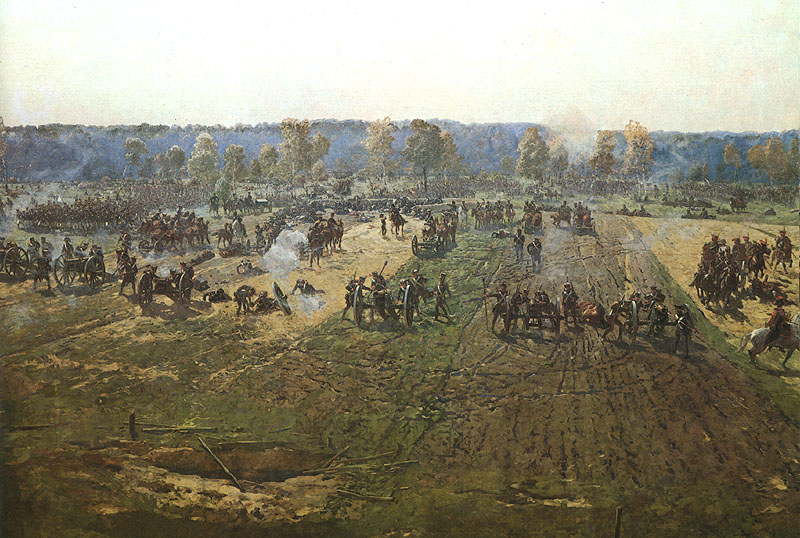
French artillery supports an attack on the Bagration flèches, a fragment of the Borodino battle panoramic painting by Franz Roubaud. The fortifications appear on the far side of the painting.

French invasion of Russia
The color black indicates the current battle.
Grey indicates the Prussian corps
Red indicates Napoleon is in command.
Blue indicates the Austrian corps.

The Bagration flèches (Russian: багратионовы флеши, romanized: bagrationovy fleshi) are three historic military earthworks named after General Pyotr Bagration, who ordered their construction. They served as the pivotal strongholds on the Russian left flank during the Battle of Borodino on 7 September [O.S. 26 August] 1812. Located south-west of the village of Semyonovskoye (Semyonovskoye (Borodino)), the flèches consisted of two lunettes and one redan. The opposing French and Russian armies stormed the flèches eight times in the course of the battle.

Infantry divisions of the Russian 2nd Army and militiamen constructed the flèches to give an opportunity to the Russian artillery of firing not only on the French front, but also the flank. Five hundred men were detailed to their construction from each division, except from the 27th, which sent six hundred. The left work was erected by the 26th Infantry Division, the right by the 2nd Grenadier Division and the middle one by the 2nd Combined Grenadiers. Construction finished on August 25, 1812 (O.S., used by the Russians) (September 6, N.S., used by the French).

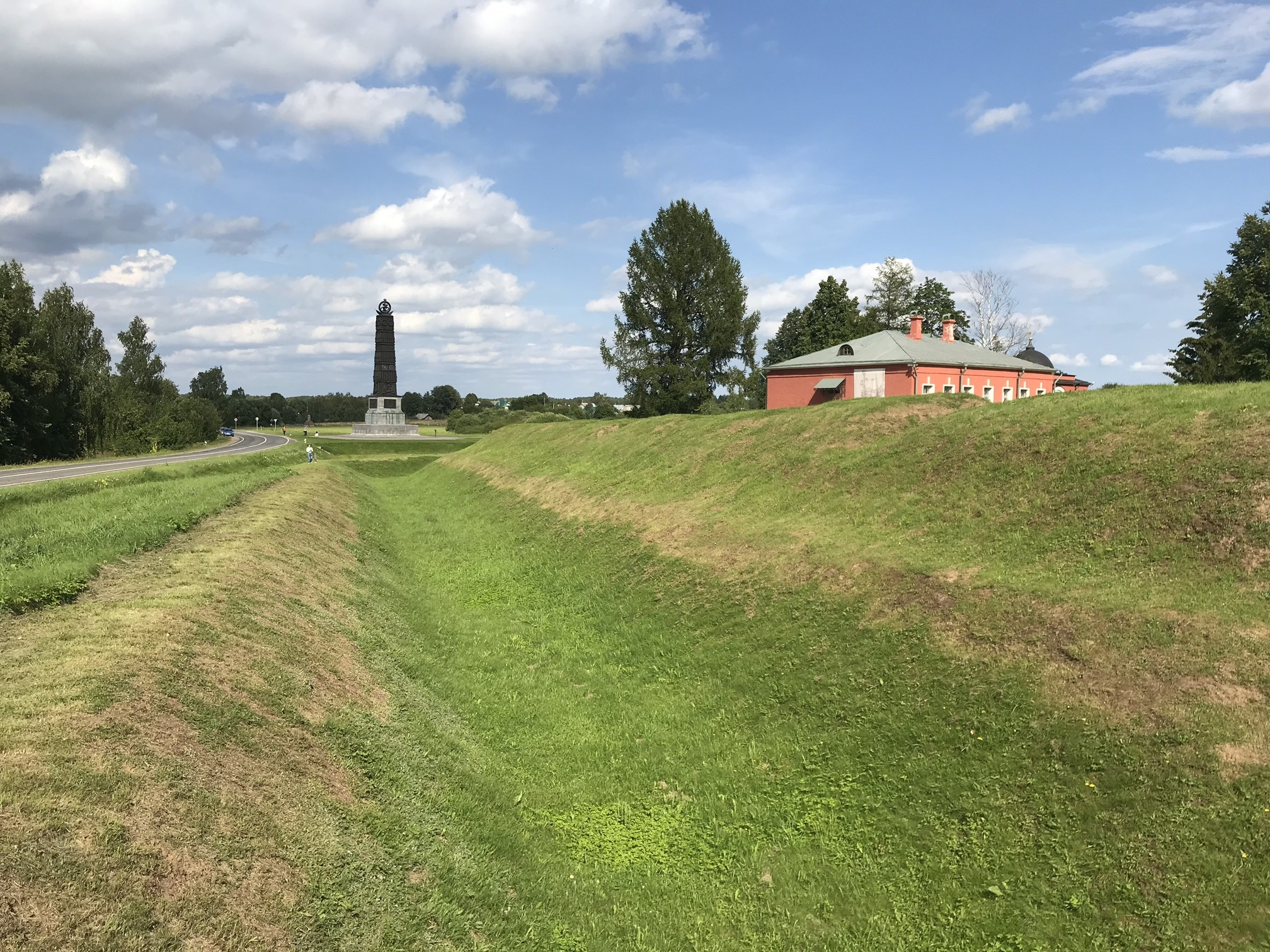
One of the flèches today

== Attacks ==
The Bagration flèches were occupied by the 11th and the 32nd Russian Battery Companies. The left work had twelve guns, the middle one had seven and the right five. Each work also had one battalion from the 2nd Combined Grenadier Division. Twenty eight guns were stationed near the flèches. On August 26 / September 7, about 6 a.m., Napoleon launched the fight for the flèches according to plan. Two infantry divisions of Joseph Marie, Count Dessaix and Jean Dominique Compans, supported by 102 guns, assaulted the flèches directly. The first attack was repelled by fire from the guns and Jäger infantry units.

In the second attempt, the French dragged their artillery closer to the Kamenka Brook and strengthened the troops with three extra infantry divisions from Michel Ney's corps, three from Joachim Murat's cavalry corps and additional artillery. After the attack at about 7 a.m. Compans' troops burst into the left flèche. The assault was repelled again by Russian infantry, the Akhtyr hussars and Novorossiyan dragoons. Bagration ordered Nikolay Raevsky to move the entire line of his 7th Infantry Corps (eight battalions) to the left-flank works. During the struggle, several French generals were wounded, and Louis-Nicolas Davout received a concussion after falling from a horse killed under him.

Before the third attack, Lieutenant-General Aleksandr Tuchkov was ordered to send reinforcements, the 3rd Infantry Division of Pyotr Konovnitsyn. At about 8 a.m., after a bombardment, the French stormed the flèches again, some being eliminated with canister shot. Compans' infantry retook the left flèche while Francois Roch Ledru des Essarts' troops rushed into the spaces between flèches. The offensive was repulsed by a bayonet counter-attack of soldiers of the 2nd Combined Grenadier and 27th Infantry Divisions.

At about 9 a.m. Napoleon ordered the fourth assault. The French succeeded in taking the flèches one hour later, but were driven out soon after.

During the fifth attempt, at 11 a.m., the French took the right and the left fortifications, and General Tuchkov was killed. However, Konovnitsyn's division managed to counter-attack and repelled the French again.

An attempt to gain the flèches' rear through the forest failed.

After regrouping, Jean Andoche Junot's infantry gained the rear of the troops defending the flèches, but it was overthrown shortly after, and Ney's and Davout's frontal attacks were also parried.

The seventh assault was made futile by the Brest, Ryazan, Minsk and Kremenchug Infantry Regiments, while Ney's and Davout's offensives were warded off once more.

The last storming was so powerful that the Russian artillery failed to stop the French columns. Bagration ordered the infantry to counter-attack and not to wait till the French approached the flèches. The fierce combat lasted about an hour. General Bagration fell from his horse when hit by shell splinters while leading the counterattack and was evacuated from the battlefield. From 60,000 men assembled for storming the flèches, up to 30,000 were lost. Historians have marked the slaughter as the "grave of the French infantry". This had been the bloodiest battle ever recorded in terms of casualty rate, with around about half the combatants becoming casualties.
