= Military surge =

Rapid increase in deployed forces

Surge capacity is the capability of an organization to rapidly expand or reorient in an emergency or disaster. A military surge or force surge reflects the ability for a military organization or nation to rapidly "increase forces in response to a situation or event", using contingency planning, flexible basing, and military reserve.

For the U.S. Navy, a surge is the rapid deployment of ships which are neither in deep maintenance, nor already underway. It may require rapid procurement of ammunition and supplies, as well as rapidly getting sailors on board. It may involve considerations of pier space and transfer of assets from one fleet to another.

Army surge involves "massive lift of reserve forces to a distant battlefield". The U.S. Army depends on reserve force deployment for surge capacity in a "no-notice or short-notice mobilization". Strategic sealift of supplies for ground forces is a Navy surge capability. Sealift can rapidly deliver massive material to a combat zone at the early stages of a contingency.

In 2023, the United States Department of Defense rolled out an information operations surge concept.

In 2024, the United States Space Force created a surge capacity using commercial vendors for space lift during a crisis, modeled after the Air Force's Civil Reserve Air Fleet.

A surge capacity in the defense industrial base is considered important to conduct large-scale modern warfare lest stockpiles be rapidly depleted. The requirement for "production lines to surge capacity effectively during periods of heightened demand" has been noted in the context of the Russo-Ukrainian war, and has been predicted in a potential US-China conflict during an attempted Chinese invasion of Taiwan.

== See also ==
- Iraq War troop surge of 2007
- List of established military terms
- Medical surge
