= Chequered retreat =

A Chequered retreat (French: retraite en échiquier) is so called from the several component parts of a pre-mechanised line or battalion, which alternately retreat and face about in the presence of an enemy, exhibiting the figure of the chequered squares upon a chess board.

== See also ==
- List of established military terms
