= Gorge (fortification) =

Part of a military fortification

A gorge in field fortification is the "unexposed side of a fieldwork", typically the rear of an independent fieldwork or detached outwork in front of the main fortress or defensive position.

== Outworks with open gorges ==
Straith describes three commonly used classes of field work: "works open at the gorge, works enclosed all round and lines." He lists the following as works open at the gorge:

- Redan
- Lunette
- Redan with flanks
- Double Redan
- Tenaille-head
- Bastion-head

Closed works are the redoubt, star fort and bastioned fort.

Gorges of 'half-closed works' were usually closed either by a parapet or stockade.

== Literature ==
- Text Book of Fortification and Military Engineering: For Use at the Royal Military Academy, Woolwich. Part 1. Text Book of Fortification and Military Engineering: For Use at the Royal Military Academy, Woolwich. London: H.M. Stationery Office. 1878.
- Neumann, Hartwig (1994). Festungsbaukunst und Festungsbautechnik Deutsche Wehrbauarchitektur vom XV. bis XX. Jahrhundert; mit einer Bibliographie deutschsprachiger Publikationen über Festungsforschung und Festungsnutzung 1945 - 1987. Architectura militaris (in German). Bonn: Bernard und Graefe. ISBN 3-7637-5929-8. OCLC 632419861.
- Straith, Hector (1850). Treatise on Fortification and Artillery. Treatise on Fortification and Artillery (5th ed.). London: W. Allen. ISBN 978-1-906394-24-0.
