= Helocast =

Military airborne insertion technique using a body of water

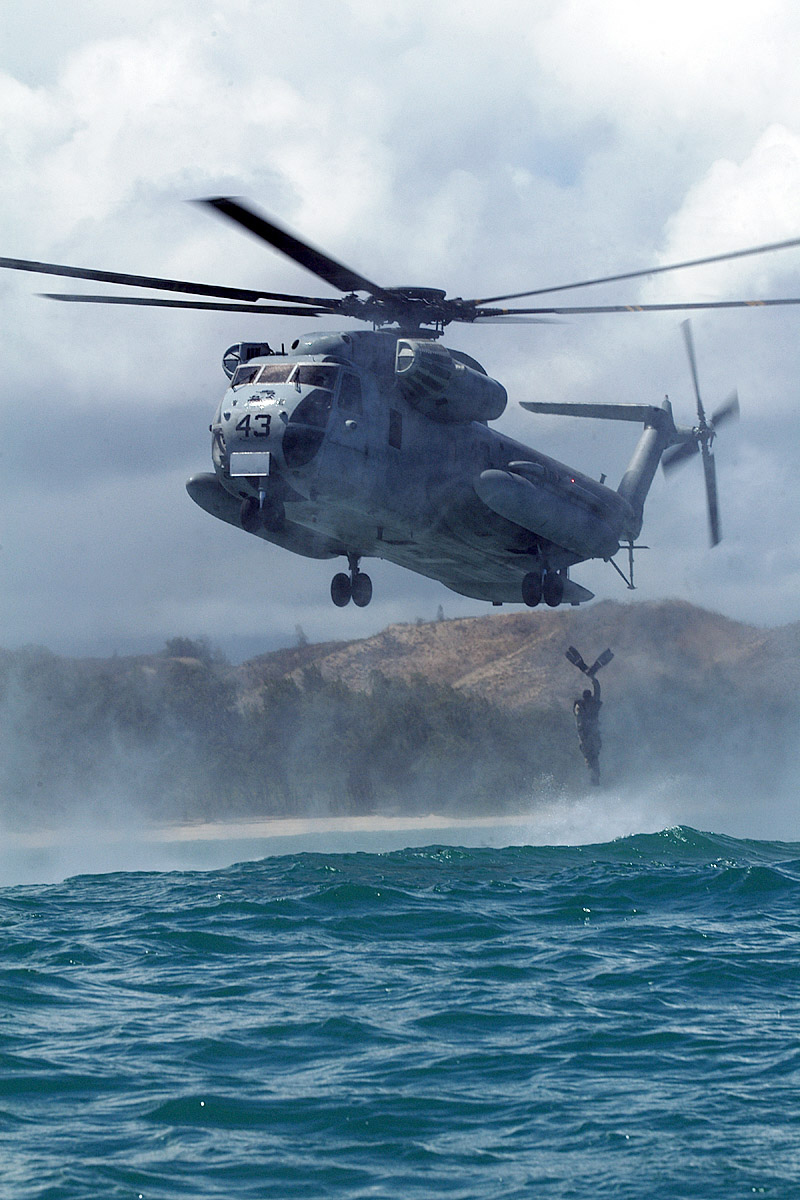
A United States Marine jumping from a CH-53D Sea Stallion during a helocast off the coast of Hawaii.

Helocasting is an airborne technique used by small unit, special operations forces, also practiced extensively by the US Army's light infantry units, to insert into a military area of operations. The small unit is flown, by helicopter, to a maritime insertion point. Once there, the aircraft assumes an altitude just above the water's surface and an airspeed of 10 knots (19 km/h) or less. Team members then exit the aircraft and enter the water.

In some cases, depending upon the mission parameters and the aircraft used, personnel may be inserted along with an inflatable boat for over-the-horizon operations. When a fully inflated boat is transported and inserted with personnel, this type of operation is known as a "hard duck". In cases where a fully inflated boat cannot be accommodated by the aircraft, it can be partially deflated for transit and inflated at the insertion point by means of a foot pump. This type of operation is known as a "soft duck". If inflation to any degree is not feasible, a "rolled duck" may be performed.

Once team members are in the water, they may swim to the objective or, in the case of a "hard duck", "soft duck", or "rolled duck", conduct an over-the-horizon transit to the objective, via inflatable boat.

== See also ==
- List of established military terms
