= Ravelin =

Triangular fortification

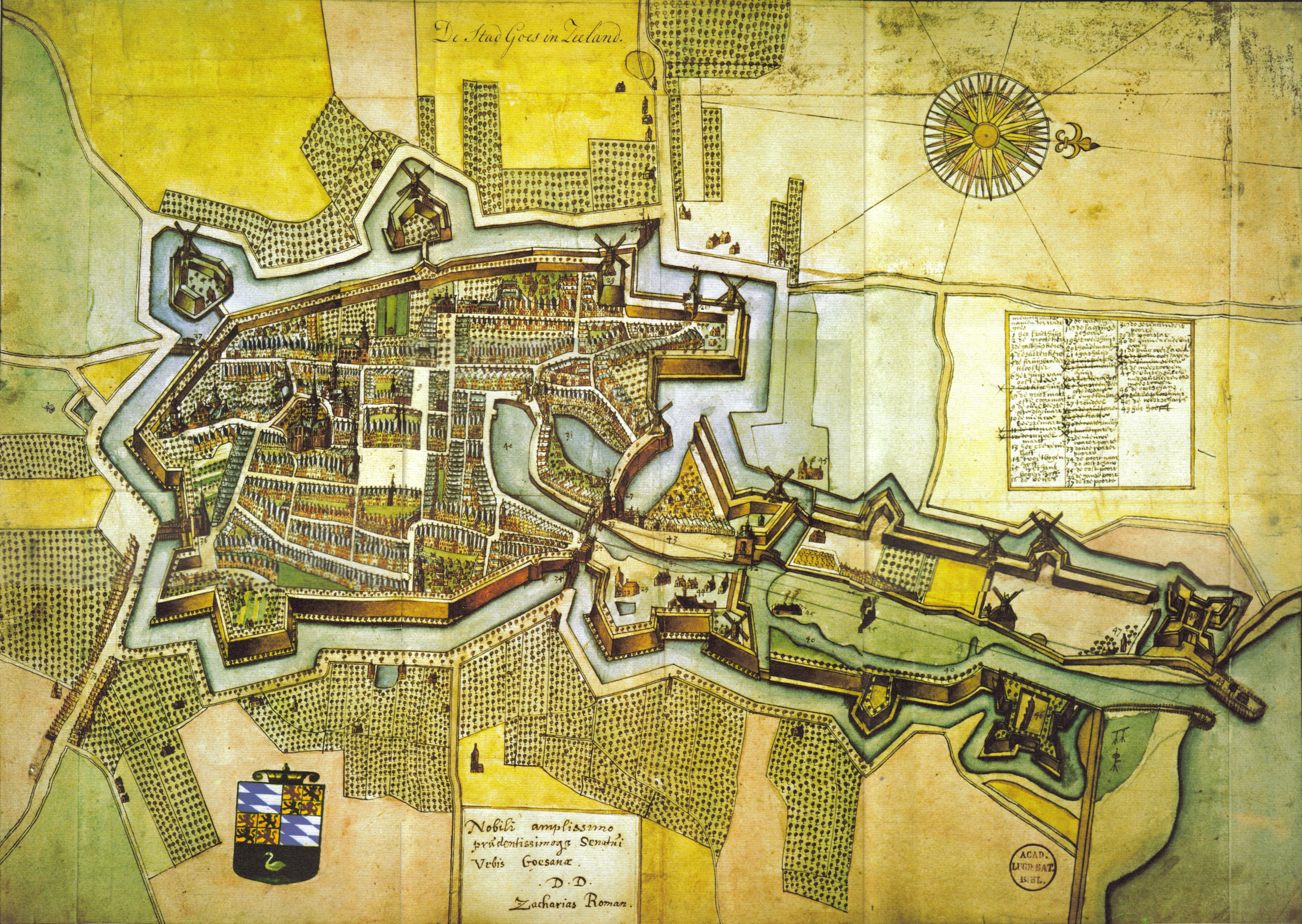
Two ravelins (top left of image) in Goes, The Netherlands

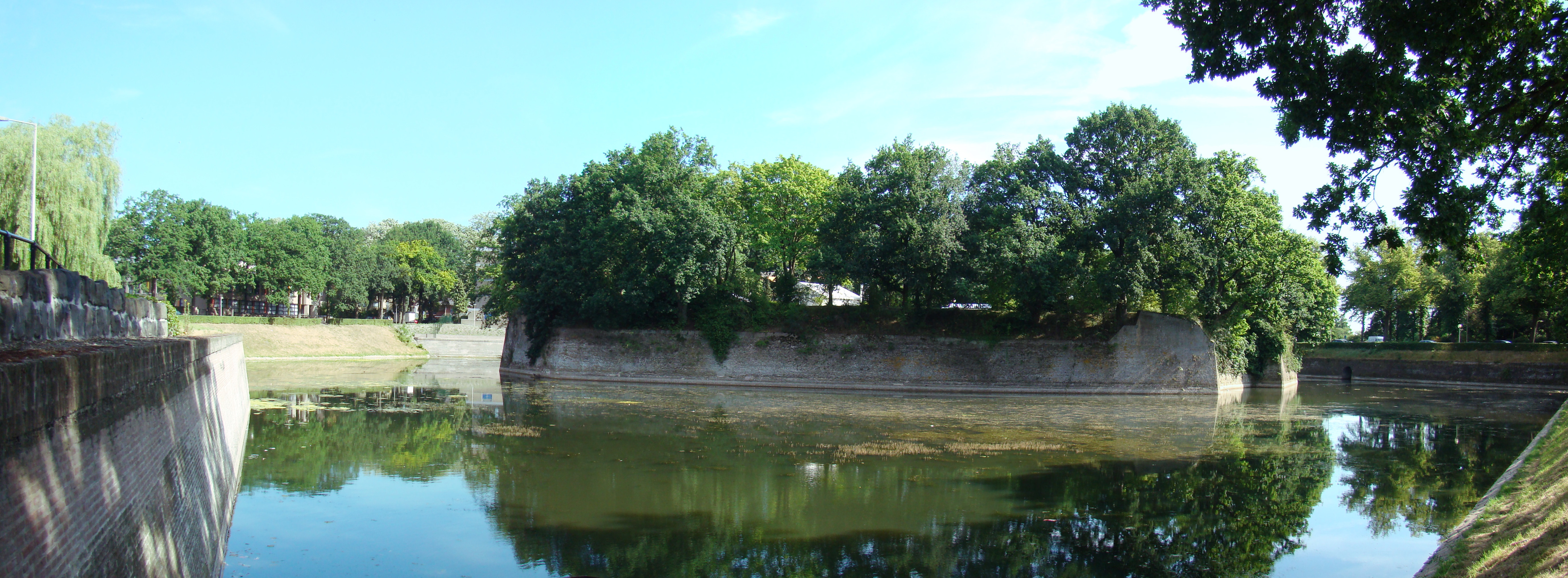
Ravelin in the Dutch town of Bergen op Zoom

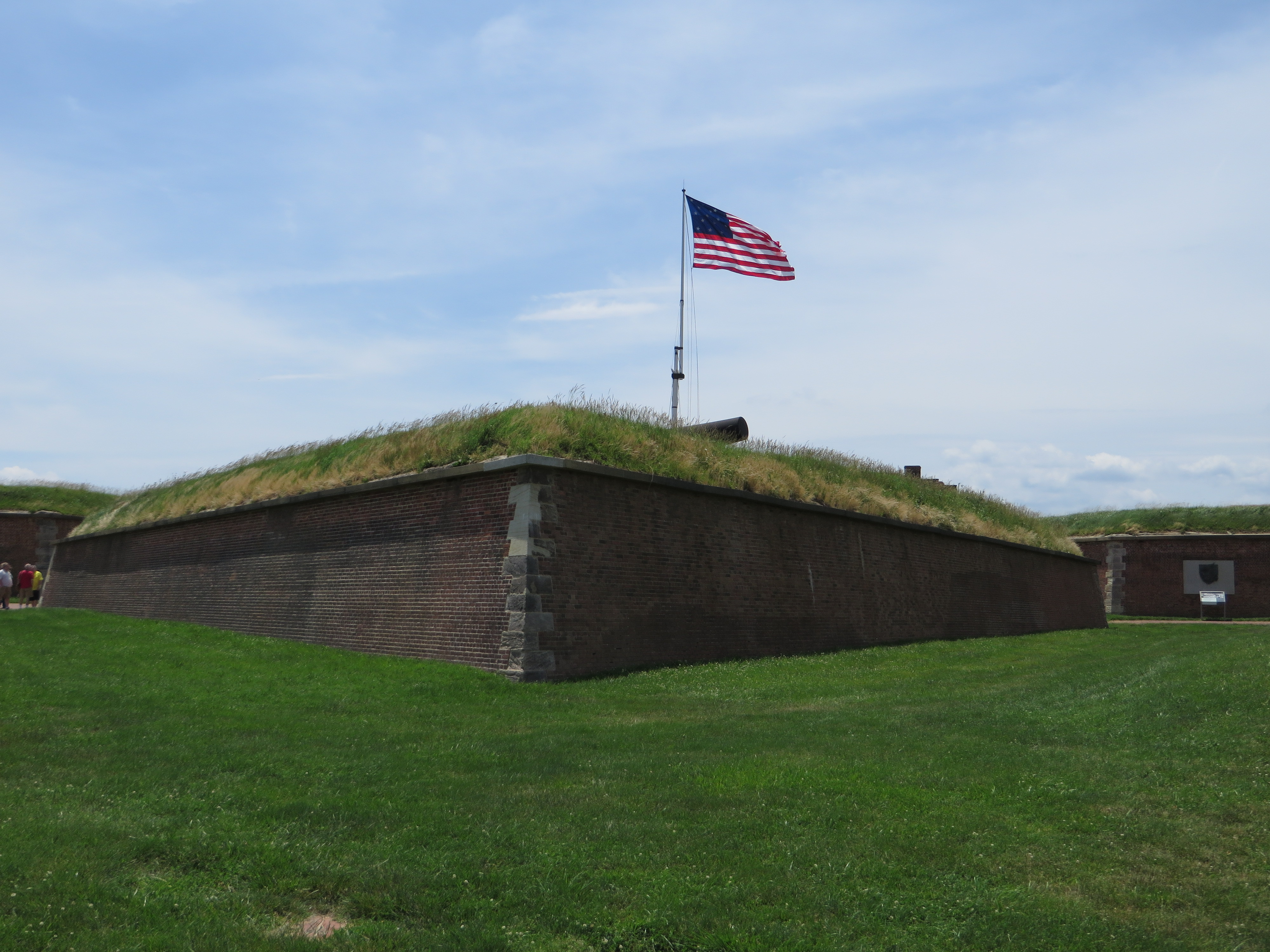
Ravelin protecting the entrance of Fort McHenry, Baltimore, Maryland

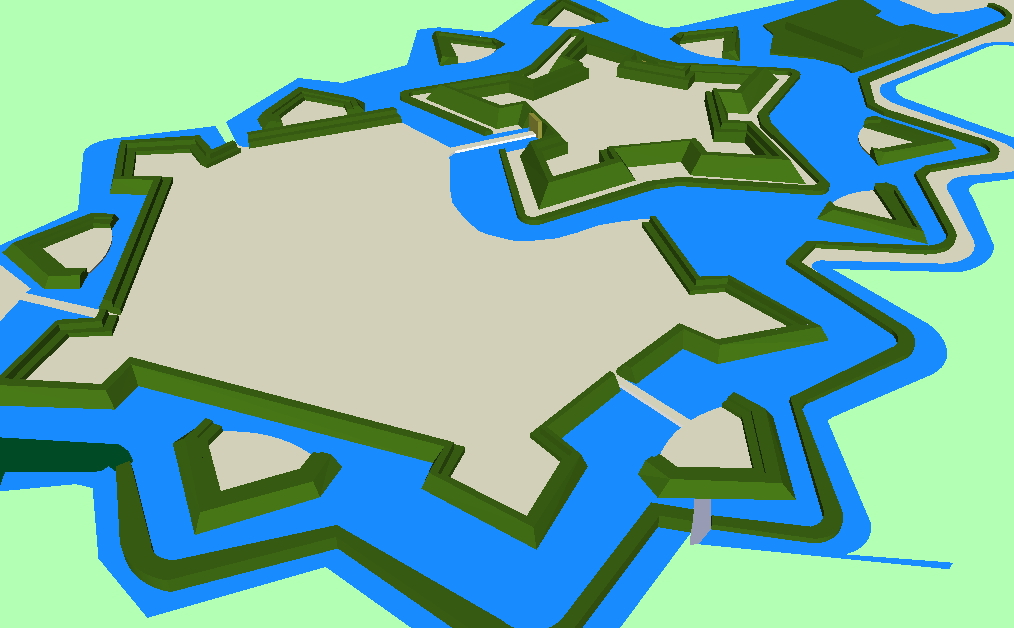
The Moers fortifications, designed by Simon Stevin, where ravelins appear as triangular shapes surrounded by water, with wall (shown in dark green) facing outwards with no wall on the inner side.

A ravelin is a triangular fortification or detached outwork, located in front of the innerworks of a fortress (the curtain walls and bastions). Originally called a demi-lune, after the lunette, the ravelin is placed outside a castle and opposite a fortification curtain wall.

The ravelin is the oldest and at the same time the most important outer work of the bastion fortification system. It originated from small forts that were supposed to cover the bridge that led across the moat to the city or fortress gate from a direct attack. From this original function, to protect the gate bridge, also comes its original Italian name "rivellino" (which means small bank work or with the German expression common for it: Brückenkopf – "bridge head"). Therefore, the ravelin was at first only a small work, which should only make the access to the bridge in front of the fortress gates more difficult. When it was realized in the 16th century that this would generally provide better protection for the courtine, ravelins were also built in front of other courtines and these were gradually enlarged. However, it was not until the German fortress builder Daniel Specklin (1536–1589) that the principal importance of ravelins (which he still called "ledige Wehr" or "revelin") was recognized. He demanded that they be made as large as possible so that they fully covered the courtine and the flanks of the bastions and could place a flanking fire in front of the bastion tops. In the following period, ravelins can be found in practically all fortresses built according to the bastion fortification system.

The outer edges of the ravelin are so configured that it divides an assault force, and guns in the ravelin can fire upon the attacking troops as they approach the curtain wall. It also impedes besiegers from using their artillery to batter a breach in the curtain wall. The side of the ravelin facing the inner fortifications has at best a low wall, if any, so as not to shelter attacking forces if they have overwhelmed it or the defenders have abandoned it. Frequently ravelins have a ramp or stairs on the curtain-wall side to facilitate the movement of troops and artillery onto the ravelin.

The first example of a ravelin appears in the fortifications of the Italian town of Sarzanello, and dates from 1497. The first ravelins were built of brick, but later, during the sixteenth century in the Netherlands, they were earthen (perhaps faced by stone or brick), the better to absorb the impact of cannonballs. The Italian origins of the system of fortifications (the star forts) of which ravelins were a part gave rise to the term trace Italienne.

The French 17th-century military engineer Vauban made great use of ravelins in his design of fortifications for Louis XIV, and his ideas were still being used in 1761 by Major William Green at Gibraltar.

== Gallery ==
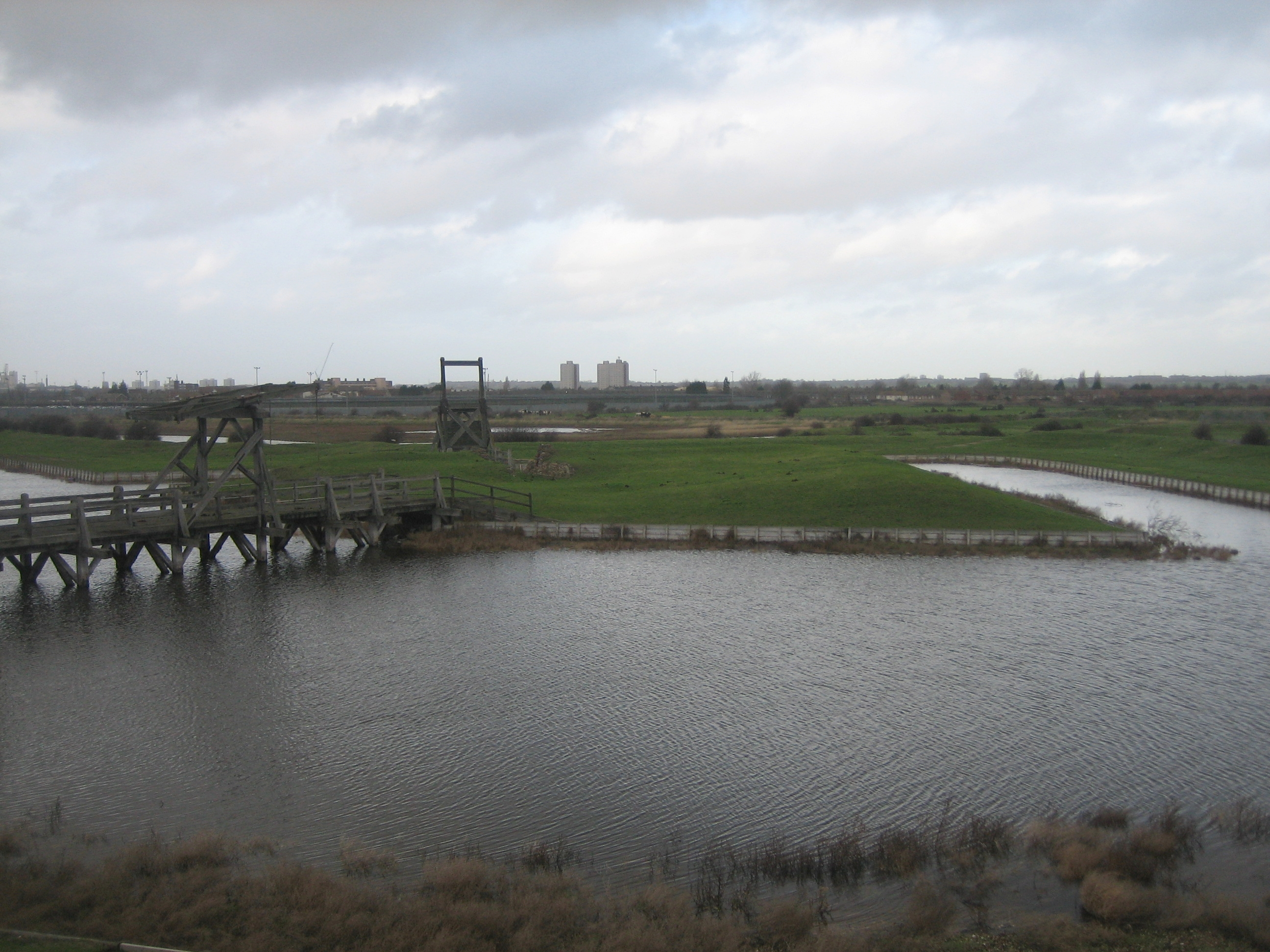
The ravelin outside the Land Gate at Tilbury Fort

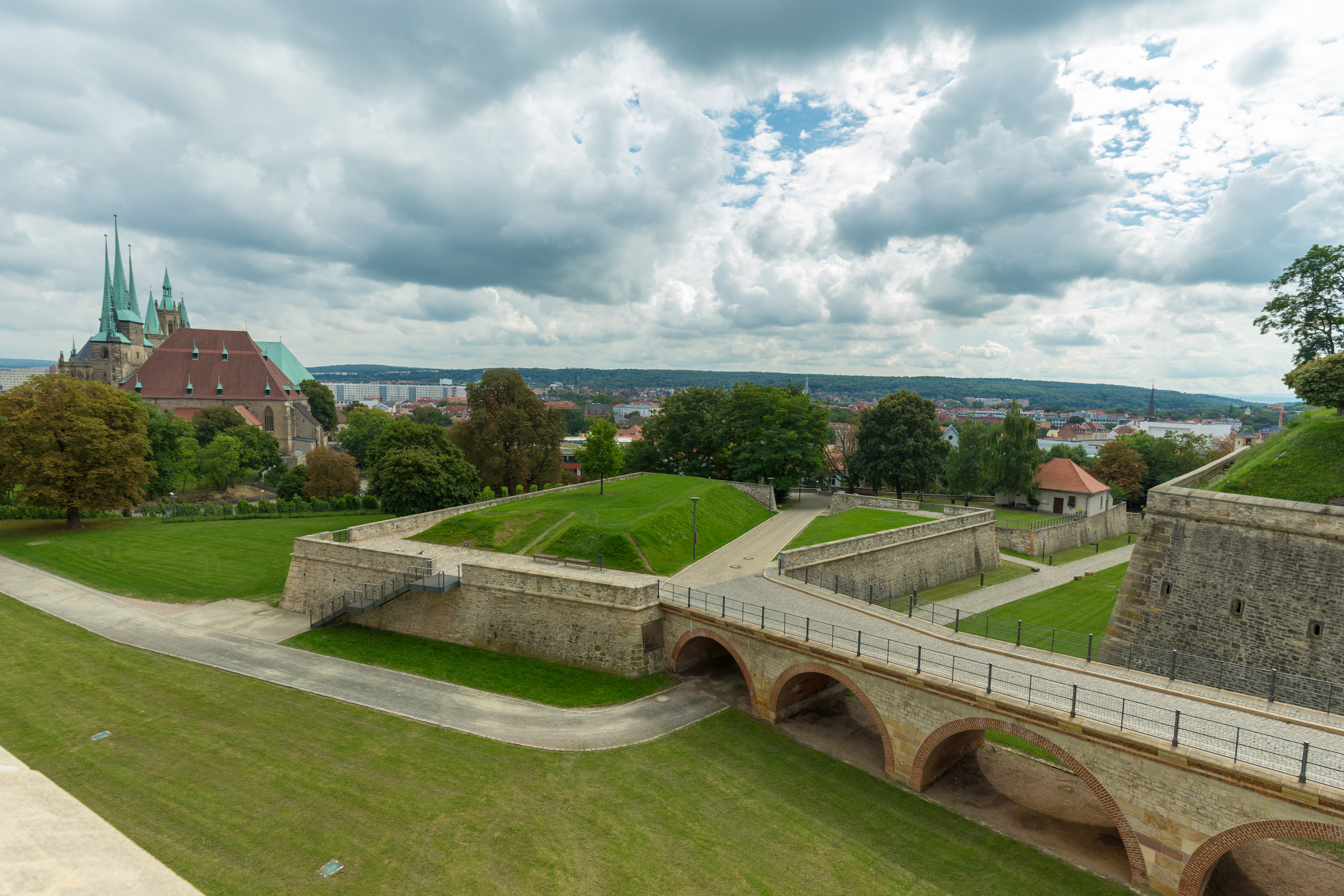
Ravelin Peter (1708) and access bridge, Petersberg Citadel, Erfurt, Germany.

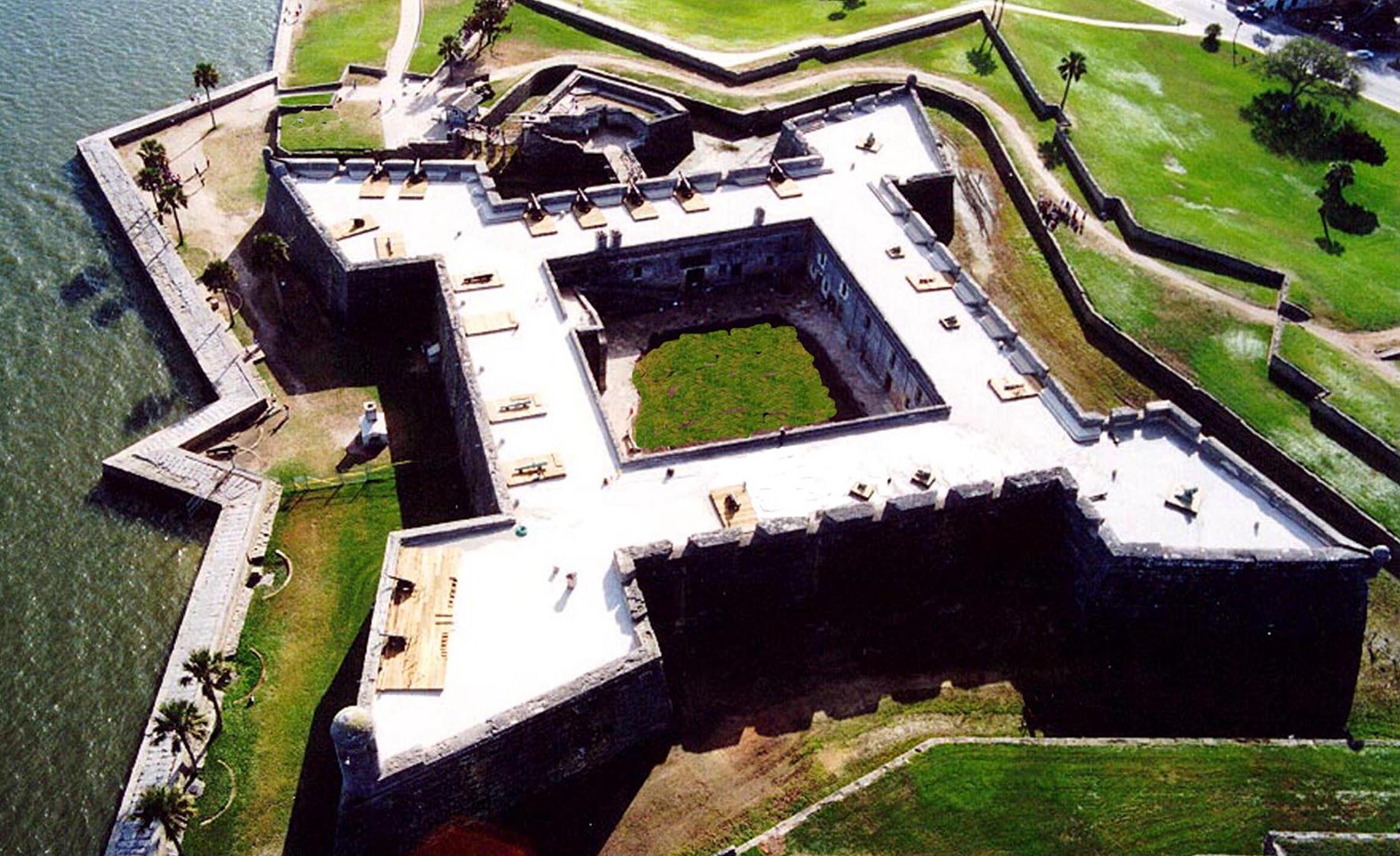
Castillo de San Marcos (c.1668), Florida. Ravelin at the top of photo, between two bastions.

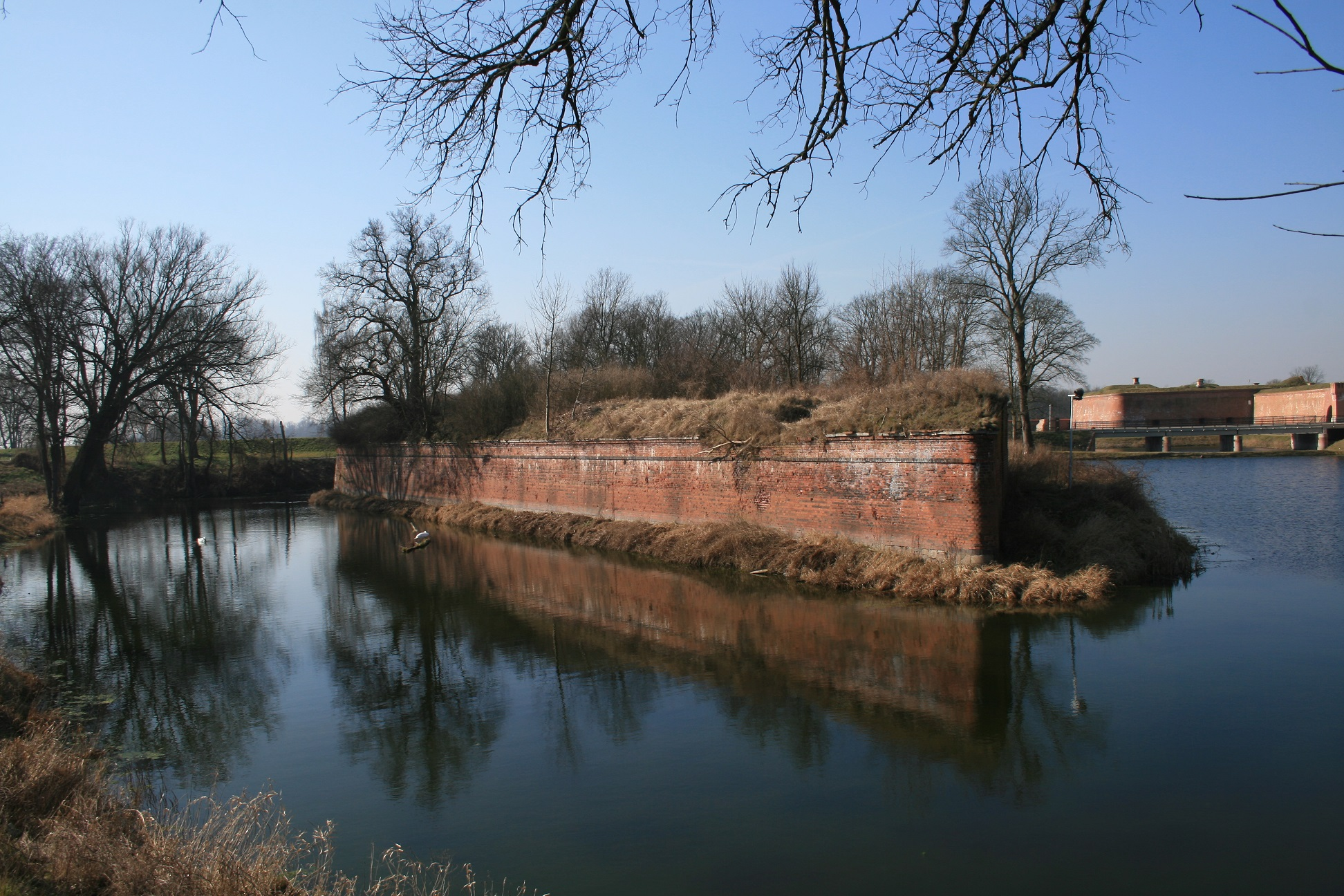
Ravelin August-Wilhelm (c.1640), Küstrin Fortress (de), Poland.

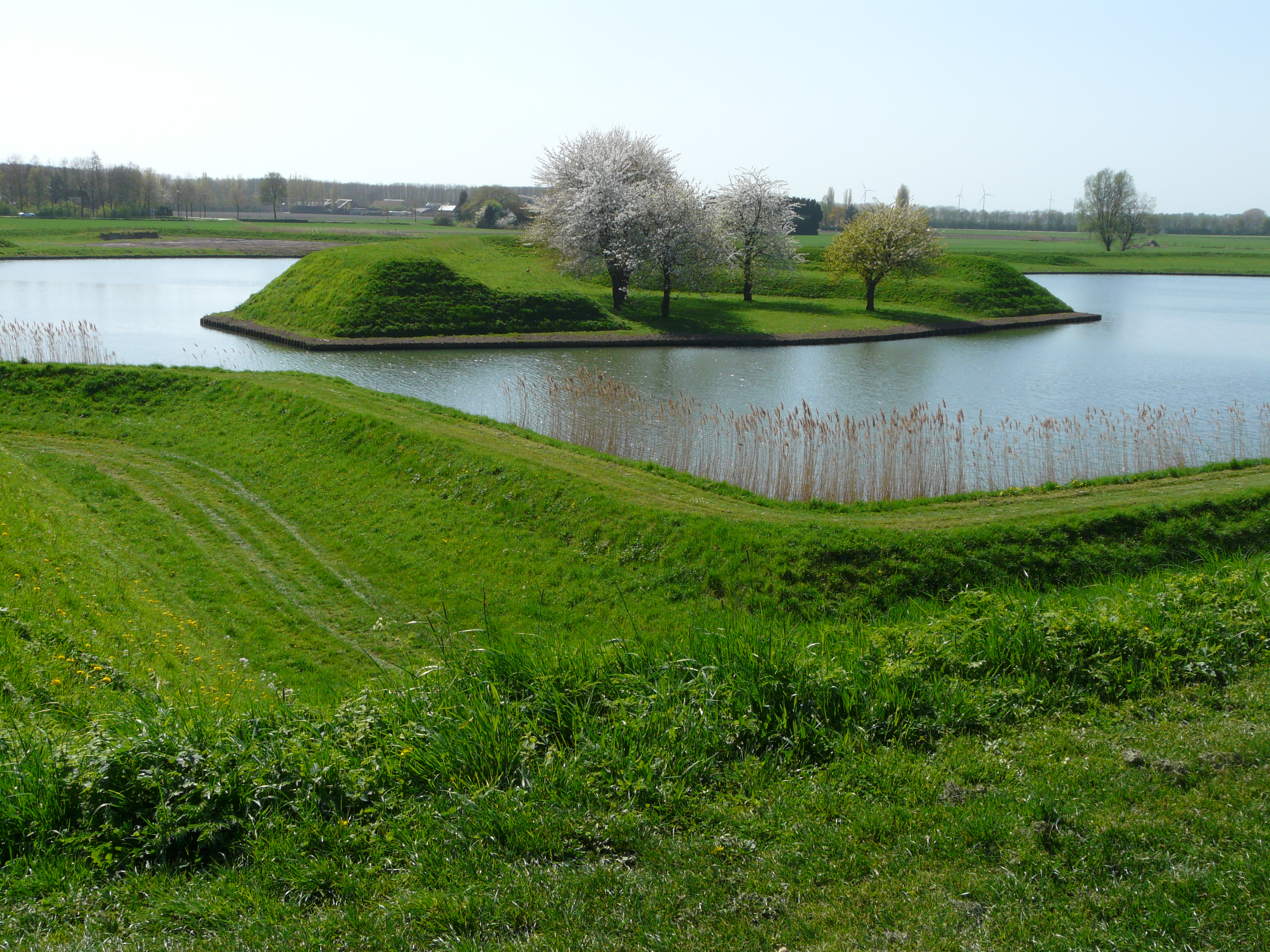
Ravelin at Heusden, the Netherlands.

== See also ==
- List of established military terms#Engineering
- Raveleijn (Efteling)
