= Flèche (fortification) =

Architectural defensive structure

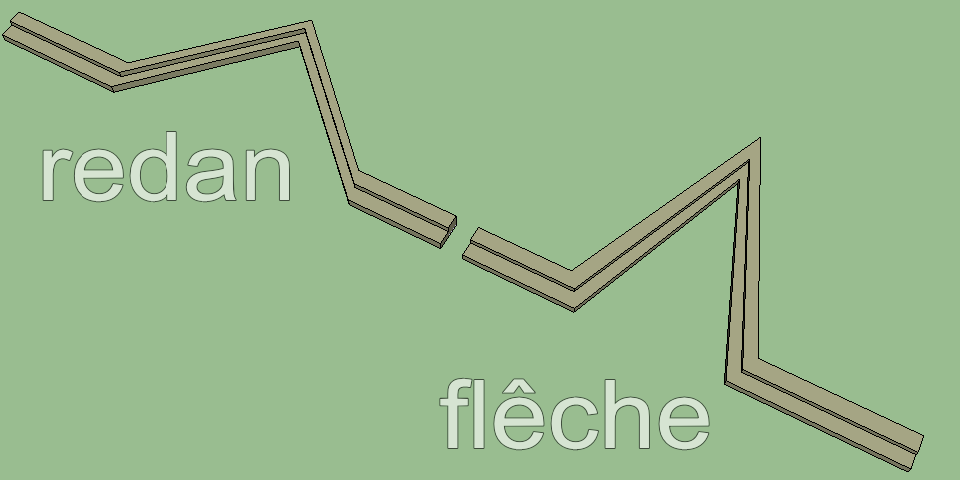
Sketch showing the principle of a redan and flèche

A flèche (Fr. for "arrow") is an outwork consisting of two converging faces with a parapet and an open gorge, forming an arrowhead shape facing the enemy.

The flèche is similar in plan to other defensive works like the ravelin (or demi-lune), but smaller and built in front of the glacis. It was thus part of the outworks of a fortress. It was usually placed in front of the point of a bastion in order to create an additional level of fire.

== Literature ==
- Horst Wolfgang Böhme, Reinhard Friedrich, Barbara Schock-Werner (eds.): Wörterbuch der Burgen, Schlösser und Festungen. Reclam, Stuttgart, 2004, ISBN 3-15-010547-1
- Wolfgang Klefisch: Die Neuendorfer Flesche – Vom Festungsmodell zum neupreußischen Festungswerk. Bornheim (Rhl) 2006 (3rd edn.)
