= Redan =

Feature in fortifications

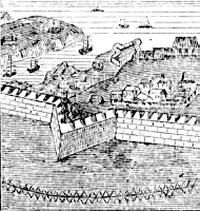
A redan as part of a fortification

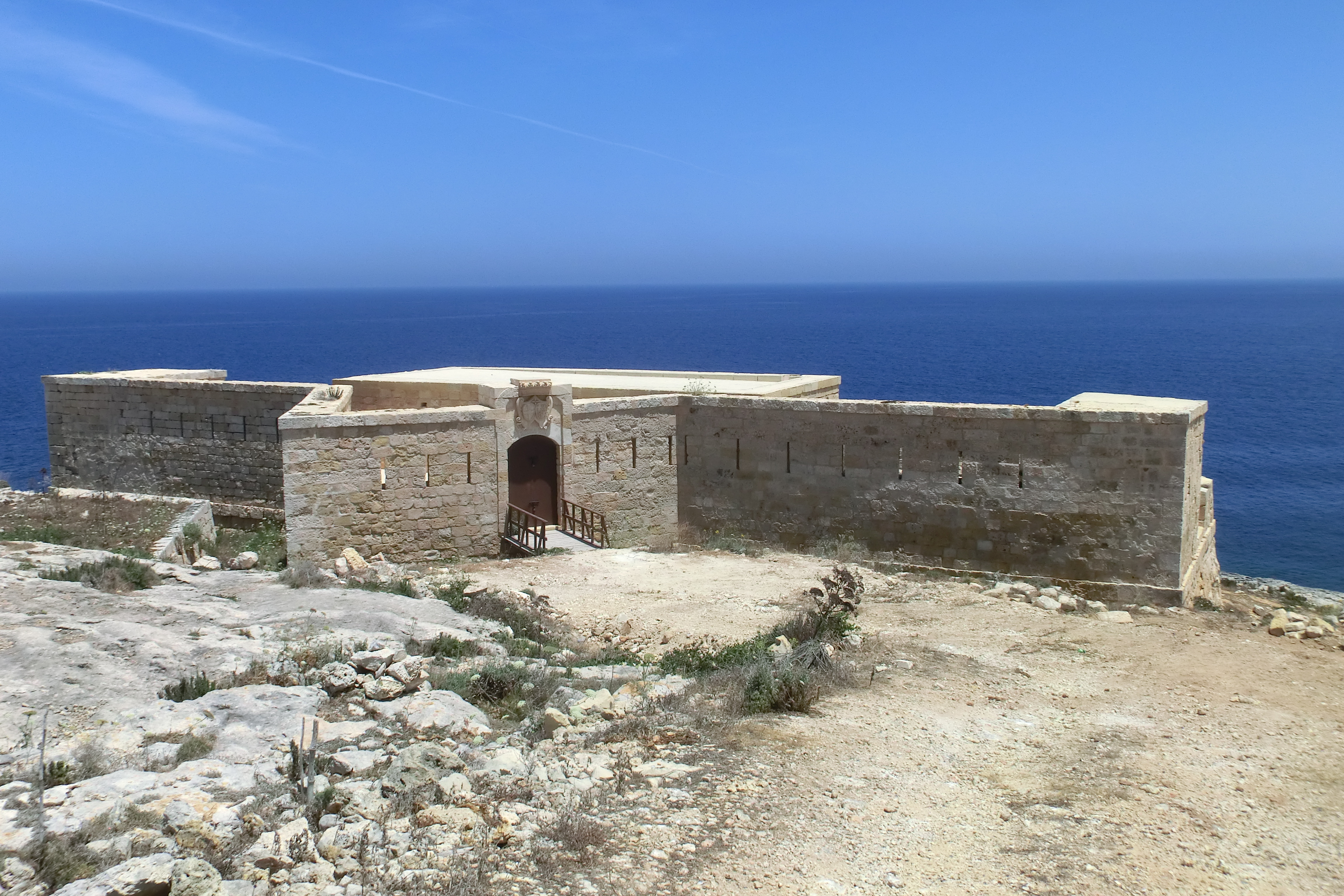
Saint Anthony's Battery in Qala, Malta, with a redan containing the entrance

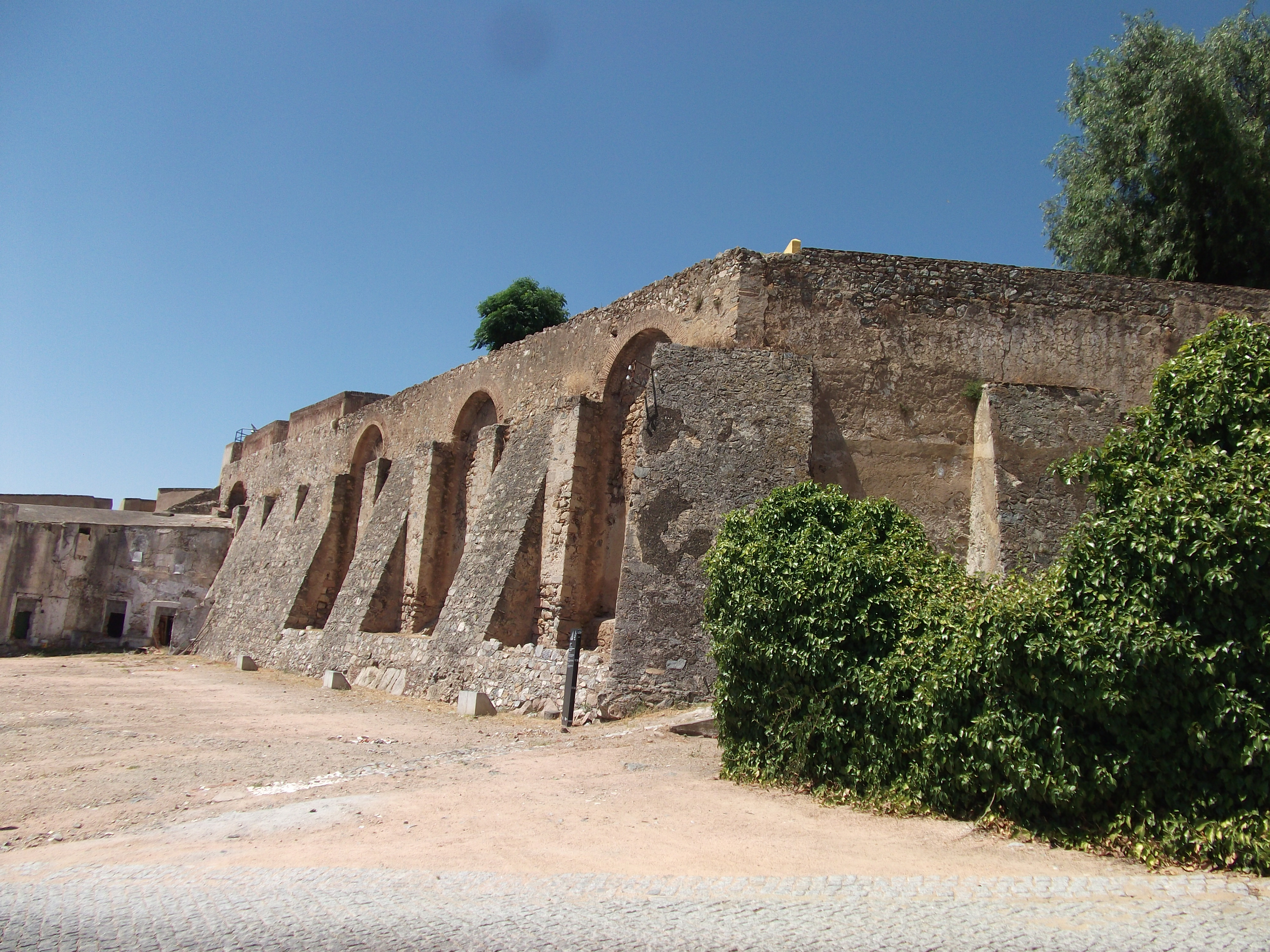
"Cascalho" Redan in the city walls of Elvas, Portugal

Redan (a French word for "projection", "salient") is a feature of fortifications. It is a work in a V-shaped salient angle towards an expected attack. It can be made from earthworks or other material.

The redan developed from the lunette, originally a half-moon-shaped outwork; with shorter flanks it became a redan.

== History ==
Redans were a common feature in the coastal batteries built in Malta between 1715 and the end of the 18th century. Surviving batteries with redans include Mistra Battery and Saint Anthony's Battery.

The Russians used redans on their left at the Battle of Borodino against Napoleon. A small redan whose faces make an obtuse angle with a vertex toward the enemy is called a flèche (arrow in French). The Bagration flèches were three redans backwards in echelon. The Shevardino Redoubt (another redan) was erected as an early warning post a mile in front of the Bagration flèches.

== Redan hole in golf ==
A Redan hole or Redan is an aspect of golf course architecture commonly associated with golf architect C.B. Macdonald. The term alludes to the "Redan" type of fortification. Specifically, a Redan hole has a green which slopes downwards and away from the point of entrance, typically the front right portion of the green. Links golf is played on the ground as much as in the air and, consequently, the green slopes away from the golfer playing to the green from the tee or fairway. Thus, it is often played in an indirect manner; that is, the player plays somewhat away from the target and then allows contours to direct the golf ball to its final resting point.

Macdonald's oft-quoted description from Scotland's Gift: Golf is as follows:

Take a narrow tableland, tilt it a little from right to left, dig a deep bunker on the front side, approach it diagonally and you have a Redan.

This definition serves well to explain the basic concept. Macdonald built his original American Redan as the fourth hole at the National Golf Links of America, commonly known as NGLA. He and his design cohorts, Seth Raynor and Charles "Steamshovel" Banks built a Redan or a reverse version of it at nearly every course that they constructed. It is a design element that has been copied by modern architects frequently - most notably the husband & wife team of Pete and Alice Dye, and Tom Doak. The design element can be used as a green complex of any "par" hole - a par 3 most commonly, but it may also be used as a par 4 or par 5 green complex.

Many Redan holes are flanked by a variety of deep bunkers, in the typical arrangement one fronts on the left side. The original "Redan" is the 15th hole on the West Links of North Berwick. A frequent feature is a somewhat raised portion of ground, often called a kick mound or kick plate, with or without a bunker to the right (in a traditional Redan) side of the green which can be skillfully used to propel the ball onto the green and nearer the hole by the more skilled golfer. Redan holes in which the green is visible from the tee can produce a particular excitement for the golfer as the ball tracks its way to the hole. At the original Redan design in North Berwick, Scotland, the green is invisible (or blind) from the tee. The NGLA version, more the inspiration for modern copies than the original hole, introduced this concept of green visibility to the design. Many golf architecture connoisseurs feel that the NGLA hole is the perhaps the greatest example of this design, exceeding the original.

The name 'Redan' in golf comes from the Crimean War, when the British captured a Russian-held fort, or redan. A serving officer—John White-Melville—is credited on his return as describing the 6th (now the 15th - Ed.) like the formidable fortress, or redan, he had encountered at Sebastopol. It was conquered only after nearly a year of attrition, in which deaths totalled more than 20,000 British and 80,000 French soldiers. The word 'Redan' is now part of the English language, and the definition given by the Oxford Dictionary is 'Fort—A work having two faces forming a salient towards the enemy.

— West Links - North Berwick

== Place names ==
In Aldershot, once 'Home of the British Army', Redan Road leads from the High Street to the top of a hill where a redan was constructed for training soldiers in Victorian times. The redan was restored by the local council and a replica cannon is installed there above a glacis. At the time of the Crimean War, several public houses in Britain adopted the name. The Redan Inn (now The Quarterdeck) in North Berwick shared its name with the famous hole on the golf course, while there is also a Redan Inn in Chilcompton, Somerset. A street in Shepherd's Bush, London is named Redan Street, and there is a street in Ipswich named Redan Street; the pub on the corner of Queensway and Westbourne Grove, London W2, was named The Redan. Its sign carried an illustration purportedly from a Napoleonic era battle, but it was more likely a Crimean War scene. The flag carried was British, but the defenders appeared to be wearing Russian uniform of the mid 19th century. Any engagement between Russians and Napoleonic armies would not have featured a British flag. Pub names like this and the Alma came into prominence after the Crimean War. The Redan public house on Thorpe Road in Norwich (now closed) was originally named The Hero of the Redan, in reference to Major-General Charles Ash Windham who took part in the Battle of the Great Redan at Sevastopol during the Crimean campaign in 1855. An area of Maryhill, Glasgow was known as 'The Redan' for many years and there is a closed-down pub called 'The Redan' close to this area on Maryhill Road, Glasgow. There was also a beerhouse called The Redan at the junction of Blue Ball Road and Cross Wells Road, Soyland, near Ripponden, West Yorkshire. It opened in 1890 and closed in 1937; the pub was later demolished. As at November 2018, CAMRA's WhatPub website lists only two extant pubs called the Redan: one in Wokingham, Berkshire, and one in Chilcompton, near Bath.

The census-designated place of Redan, Georgia was likely named for the redans built in the area during the Atlanta campaign of the American Civil War.

Redan is also a southern suburb of the regional city of Ballarat in central western Victoria, Australia. It was named for the fortifications used during the battle at Sevastopol in Ukraine during the Crimean War.
