= Lunette (fortification) =

Outwork fortification

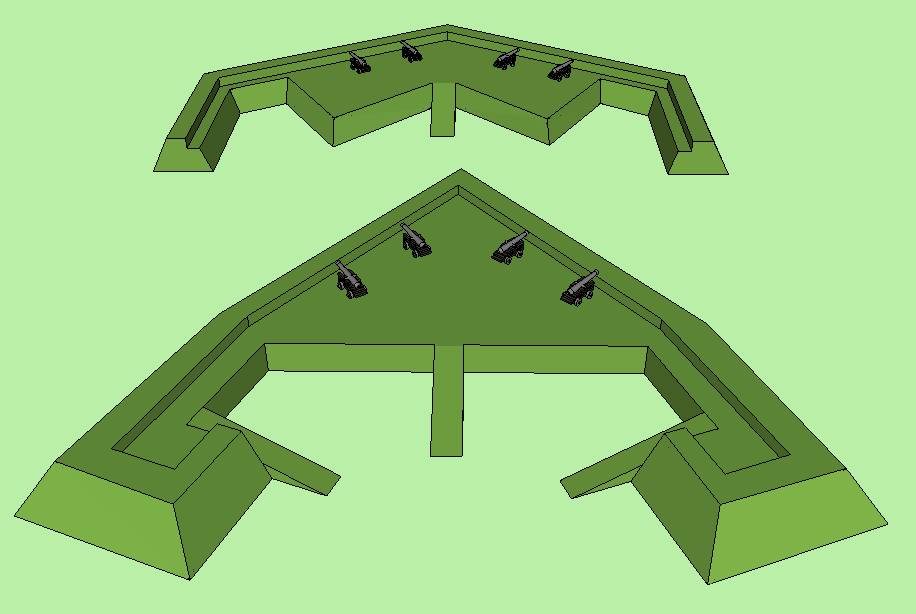
Two different kinds of lunette

In fortification, a lunette was originally an outwork of half-moon shape; later it became a redan with short flanks, in trace somewhat resembling a bastion standing by itself without curtains on either side. The gorge was generally open.

One noted historical example of a lunette was the one used at the Battle of the Alamo in San Antonio, Texas, in March 1836. Another were the Bagration flèches, at the Battle of Borodino, in 1812.

== See also ==
- List of established military terms
