= Tenaille =

Type of defensive-work

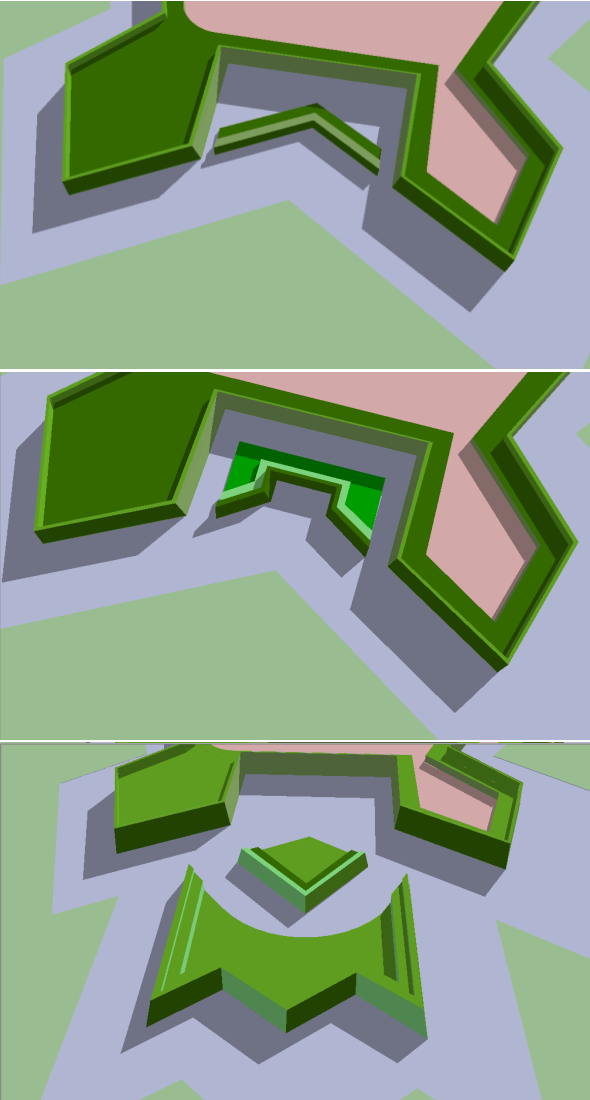
Diagrams of a tenaille, a tenaille augmented with a straight face (un pan coupé), and a bonnet or priest's cap (with two tenailles) outside a ravelin.

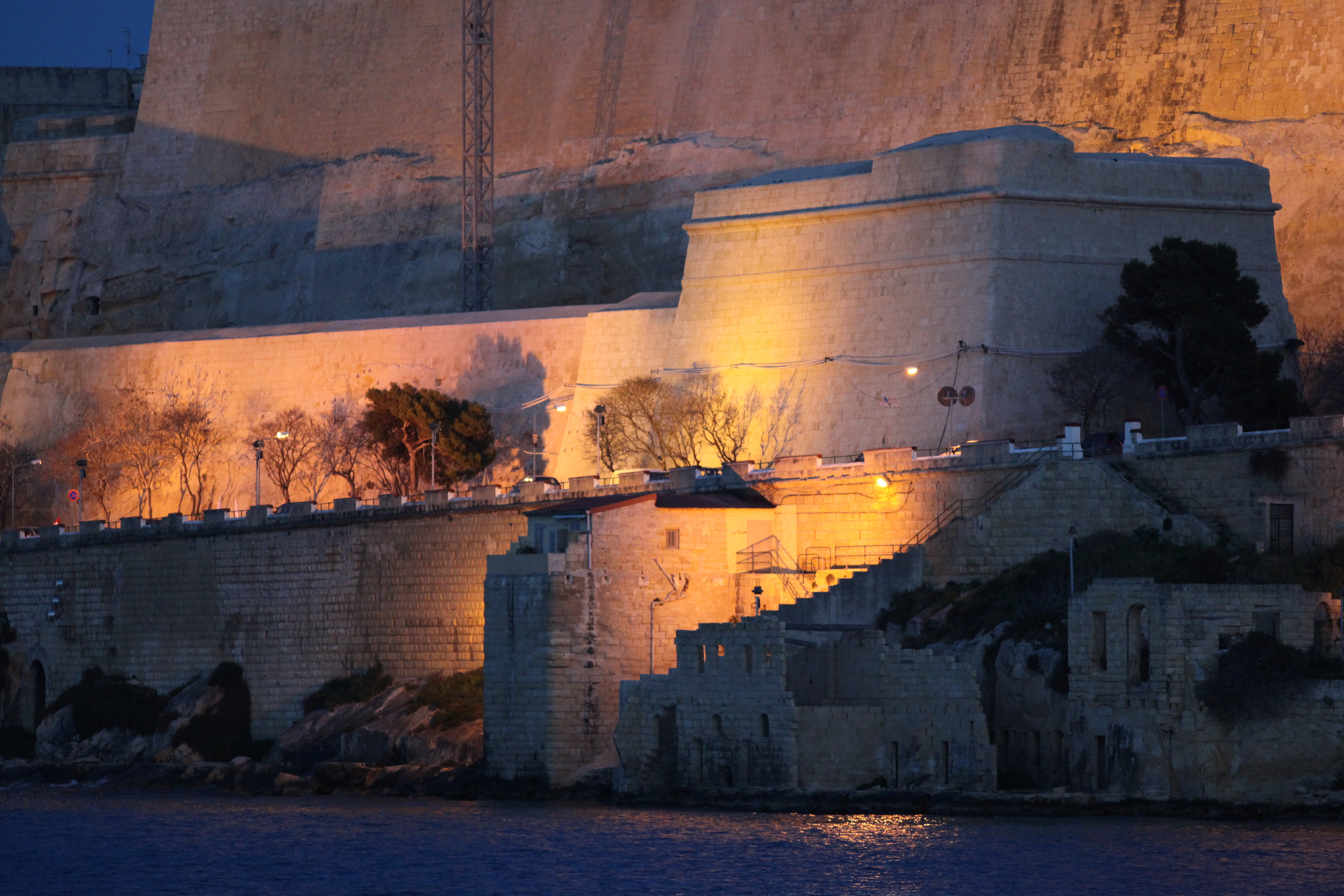
St. Andrew's Tenaille in Valletta

A tenaille (archaic tenalia) is an advanced defensive-work, in front of the main defences of a fortress, which takes its name from resemblance to the lip of a pair of pincers. It is "from French, literally: tongs, from Late Latin tenācula, pl of tenaculum".

In a letter to John Bradshaw, President of the Council of State in London, Oliver Cromwell writing from Dublin on 16 September 1649 described one such tenaille that played a significant part during the storming of Drogheda.

There was a Tenalia to flanker the south Wall of the Town, between Duleek Gate and the corner Tower before mentioned;—which our men entered, wherein they found some forty or fifty of the Enemy which they put to the sword. And this 'Tenalia' they held: but it being without the Wall, and the sally-port through the Wall into that Tenalia being choked up with some of the Enemy which were killed in it, it proved of no use for an entrance into the Town that way. —

— Oliver Cromwell

Tenaille were a development in fortification formalised by Vauban, among others. A postern gate was placed low down in the curtain wall close to the centre in order to allow the defenders to access the ditches that front the wall. To protect the postern, an outwork, originally V-shaped, was placed in front of the gate, providing an area where the defenders could leave the fortification without being seen or directly shot at. A simple tenaille is shown in the top image to the right; it is the chevron between the two corner bastions. The design also evolved a version in which the tenaille possesses projections at each end, as seen in the middle image to the right. The name was also used for some other V-shaped parts of outworks; the bottom-most image, a priest's cap, has two tenailles. Also shown is another approach to protect a gate; the roughly triangular outwork seen in the middle of the bottom drawing is a ravelin.
