= Chemin de ronde =

Raised protected walkway behind a castle battlement

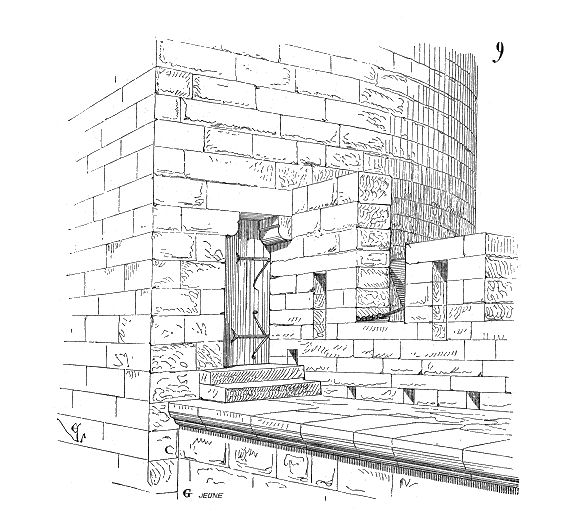
Chemin de ronde on a curtain wall. Access is given to the battlements and shooting slots in the parapet as well as to a tower door.

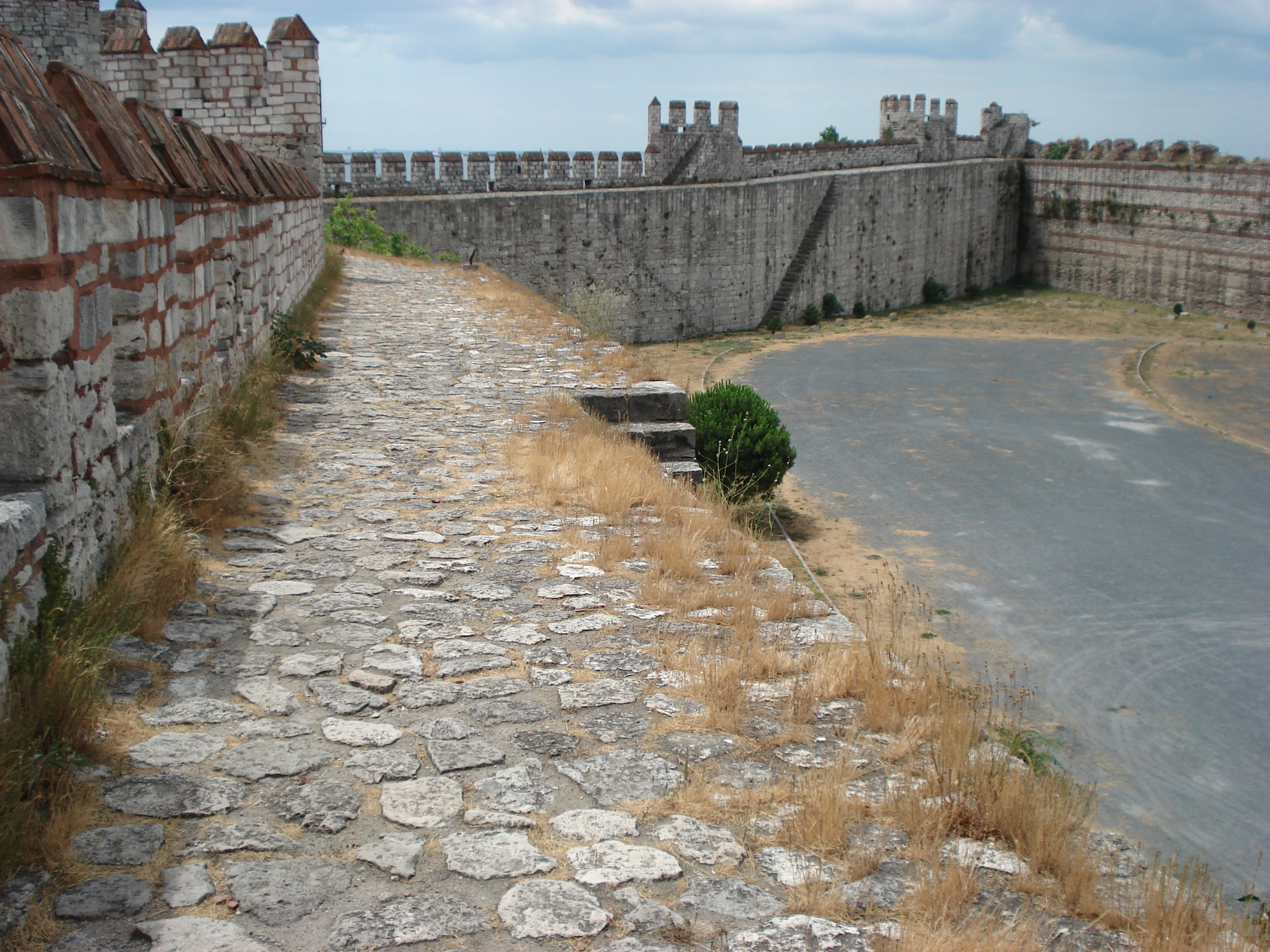
The chemin de ronde of the Yedikule Fortress, Istanbul, Turkey.

A chemin de ronde (French, "round path"' or "patrol path"; French pronunciation: [ʃəmɛ̃ də ʁɔ̃d]), also called an allure, alure or, more prosaically, a wall-walk, is a raised protected walkway behind a castle battlement.

In early fortifications, high castle walls were difficult to defend from the ground. The chemin de ronde was devised as a walkway allowing defenders to patrol the tops of ramparts, protected from the outside by the battlements or a parapet, placing them in an advantageous position for shooting or dropping.
