= Outwork =

Type of fortification

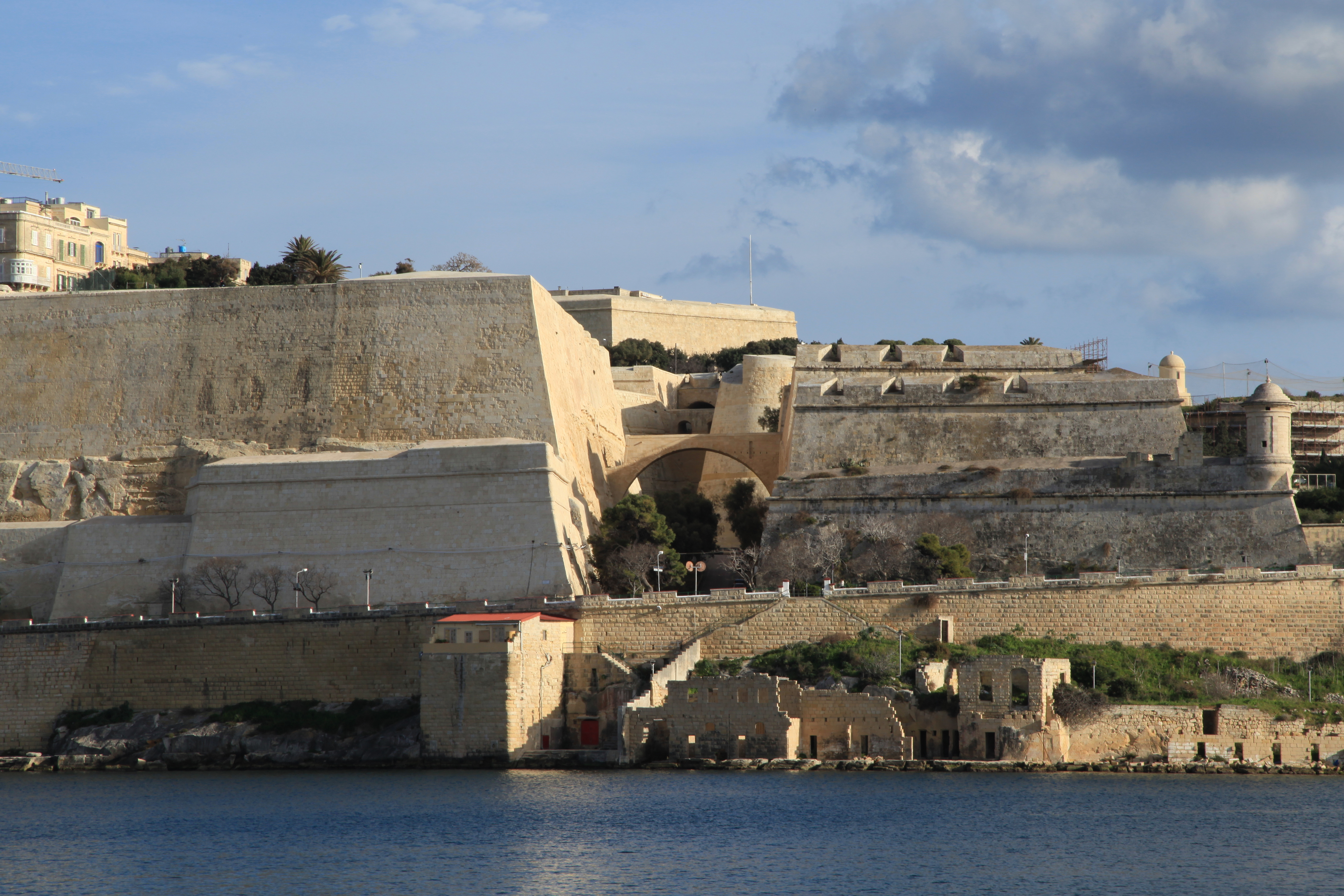
View of the fortifications of Valletta, with the main fortification (a bastion) to the left, the ditch in the centre, and the outwork (a counterguard) to the right

An outwork is a minor fortification built or established outside the principal fortification limits, detached or semidetached. Outworks such as ravelins, lunettes (demilunes), flèches and caponiers to shield bastions and fortification curtains from direct battery were developed in the 16th century. Later, the increasing scale of warfare and the greater resources available to the besieger accelerated this development, and systems of outworks grew increasingly elaborate and sprawling as a means of slowing the attacker's progress and making it more costly. When taken by an enemy force, their lack of rear-facing ramparts left them totally open to fire from the main works.

An advanced work, a fortification detached and forward of the main castle or fortification, is sometimes referred to as a type of outwork or 'advanced outwork'.

The hornwork and crownwork are subtypes of outworks.

== See also ==
- List of established military terms
