= Mohammed Merah =

Algerian-French jihadist, author of the 2012 Toulouse and Montauban shootings

- Born: 10 October 1988; Toulouse, France
- Died: 22 March 2012 (aged 23); Toulouse, France
- Citizenship: France
- Occupation: Mechanic
- Organization: Al-Qaeda
- Parent(s): Zoulikha Aziri (mother); Mohamed Benalel Merah (father)
- Relatives: Two brothers, two sisters

Details
- Date: 11–22 March 2012
- Locations: Toulouse and Montauban, France
- Targets: French soldiers and Jews
- Killed: 7
- Injured: 11
- Weapon: Handgun

Mohammed Merah (Arabic: محمد مراح; 10 October 1988 – 22 March 2012) was a French jihadist who admitted to killing seven people—three French soldiers, a Rabbi, and three children at a Jewish school—in several shootings in southwestern France in March 2012. He was killed following a police siege and standoff.

== Biography ==
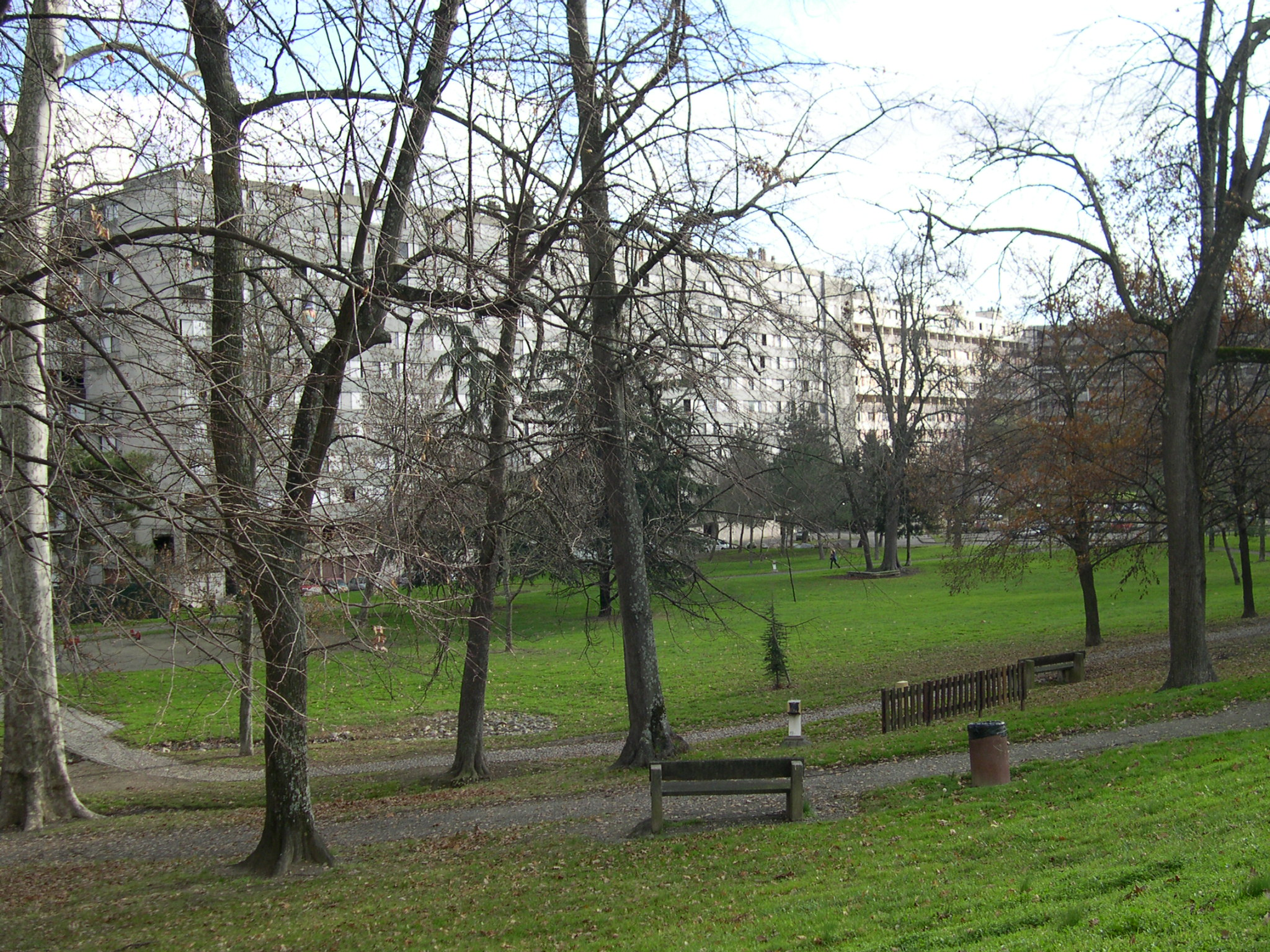
Quartier Bellefontaine in Toulouse

Merah was born on 10 October 1988 to French parents of Algerian origin. His parents divorced when he was five. He was raised, along with his two brothers and sisters, by their single mother in a "tough part of Toulouse". As a minor, he was described as having "a violent profile from childhood and behavioural troubles".

Merah was described as a polite and loner youth. He was arrested numerous times as a youth, mostly for petty crimes such as purse-snatching. He was first arrested in 2005 and served two short prison terms; the first was 18 months in 2007-08 for aggravated robbery, and the second was in 2009. His convictions reportedly included thefts and driving offences. According to his friends, Merah never went to the mosque, although his family had been traditionally Muslim. He was known to French authorities because of his travels to Afghanistan and Pakistan, which were on various watch lists.

After the shootings, French TV station M6 published a 2006 French intelligence document. It said that Merah was a member of the Islamist jihadist movement Forsane Alliza, a French organisation with a cluster of followers in Toulouse who are suspected of inciting violence and terrorism. The French government outlawed the Forsane Alizza organization because it was encouraging citizens to travel to Afghanistan to fight jihad. The lawyer for the group, speaking after the shootings, denied claims that the leader of the group had any connections with Merah. French intelligence described Merah as having the "ability to travel and furnish logistic assistance to other militants." The document revealed that Merah was under surveillance since 2006. Police have been investigating whether Merah acted alone in planning his attacks.

On 25 December 2008, Merah tried to commit suicide by hanging. A subsequent psychiatric report described Merah as polar narcissistic, noting his slicked-back hair and high interest in personal grooming and designer clothes. Merah was described as a polar introvert. The psychiatrist stated Merah's "mood is stable" but that he "recently had dark thoughts" and spoke of "suicidal intentions." He found Merah to be "anxious" and "introverted" but not "psychologically disturbed". He said Merah exhibited "neurotic fragility owing to the departure of his father and lack of supervision on his mother's part." Merah had a history of psychological problems.

French intelligence officials have suggested he had a double life or even a split personality, which allowed him to party in nightclubs and drink alcohol with acquaintances who were unaware of his arsenal of weapons, visits to Afghanistan and Pakistan, and attack plans. He had been married but separated from his wife.

In January 2008, Merah tried to join the French Army, but was rejected because of his criminal past. In July 2010, he went to the recruitment centre of the Foreign Legion and stayed overnight, but left before he could be evaluated.

According to declassified documents from the DCRI (French domestic intelligence), Merah and his older brother Abdelkader had been placed under surveillance in late 2009 after they traveled to Egypt, where Merah went to learn Arabic. In 2010, he was identified as a "new recruit" in radical Islamist circles. The DCRI questioned him after he returned from a visit to Pakistan.

French media reported that in 2010 Merah had forced a neighbour's boy to watch graphic war videos from Afghanistan and beat up the boy's sister after the mother intervened. Bernard Squarcini said that Merah "appeared on radars" when arrested in Kandahar, Afghanistan in December 2010, while visiting as a "tourist." He was followed officially by French intelligence after his return from Pakistan in 2011.

The French newspaper JDD reported Merah's friends described him as a "nice guy" who "got on well with everyone". His friends found him sometimes devout, but Merah would also go clubbing. One friend commented that Merah identified "more with Islam than with France." Another friend said that Merah had been seen in a Toulouse night club three weeks before the attacks. Merah had also traveled to Geneva, Switzerland on a skiing trip with two friends a month before the attacks. He allegedly bought a GoPro video camera there which he used to film his attacks.

According to Merah's lawyer, he was sentenced to a month in prison on 24 February 2012 after driving without a driving licence, and was due before the judge again in April. Merah had reportedly split from his wife days before the shootings. He was unemployed at the time of the shootings after having worked as a coachbuilder.

== Toulouse and Montauban shootings ==
Map of March 2012 attacks in Toulouse and Montauban, and scarlet Vigipirate area, in France

=== Filming ===
Merah filmed all of the killings using a GoPro camera strapped to his body. He made a video of them set to music and verses of the Koran. He sent the video to news agency Al Jazeera. After a request from French President Nicolas Sarkozy, Al Jazeera decided against airing the video. One video shows Merah shooting two French Muslim soldiers in Montauban, and shouting Allahu Akbar.

=== Motivation ===
Prior to the identification of Merah as the attacker, French President Nicolas Sarkozy said that the antisemitic nature of the Jewish school attack appeared obvious. After Merah was identified, Sarkozy stated that "the Islamic faith has nothing to do with the insane motivations of this man," and others have repeated this view. Merah admitted antisemitic motivations for his attack during the siege with police.

Some media have described Merah as an "Islamic terrorist". Merah said that he resented France's ban on women wearing the burqa, and that "the Jews have killed our brothers and sisters in Palestine."

He also wanted to avenge the French Army's involvement in the war in Afghanistan. An editor at France 24 reported that Merah told him that these acts were not only necessary, but that they were to "uphold the honour of Islam". During the murders, Merah said, "you killed my brothers, I kill you." Journalist Ed West described this as an expression of tribalism, not religion.

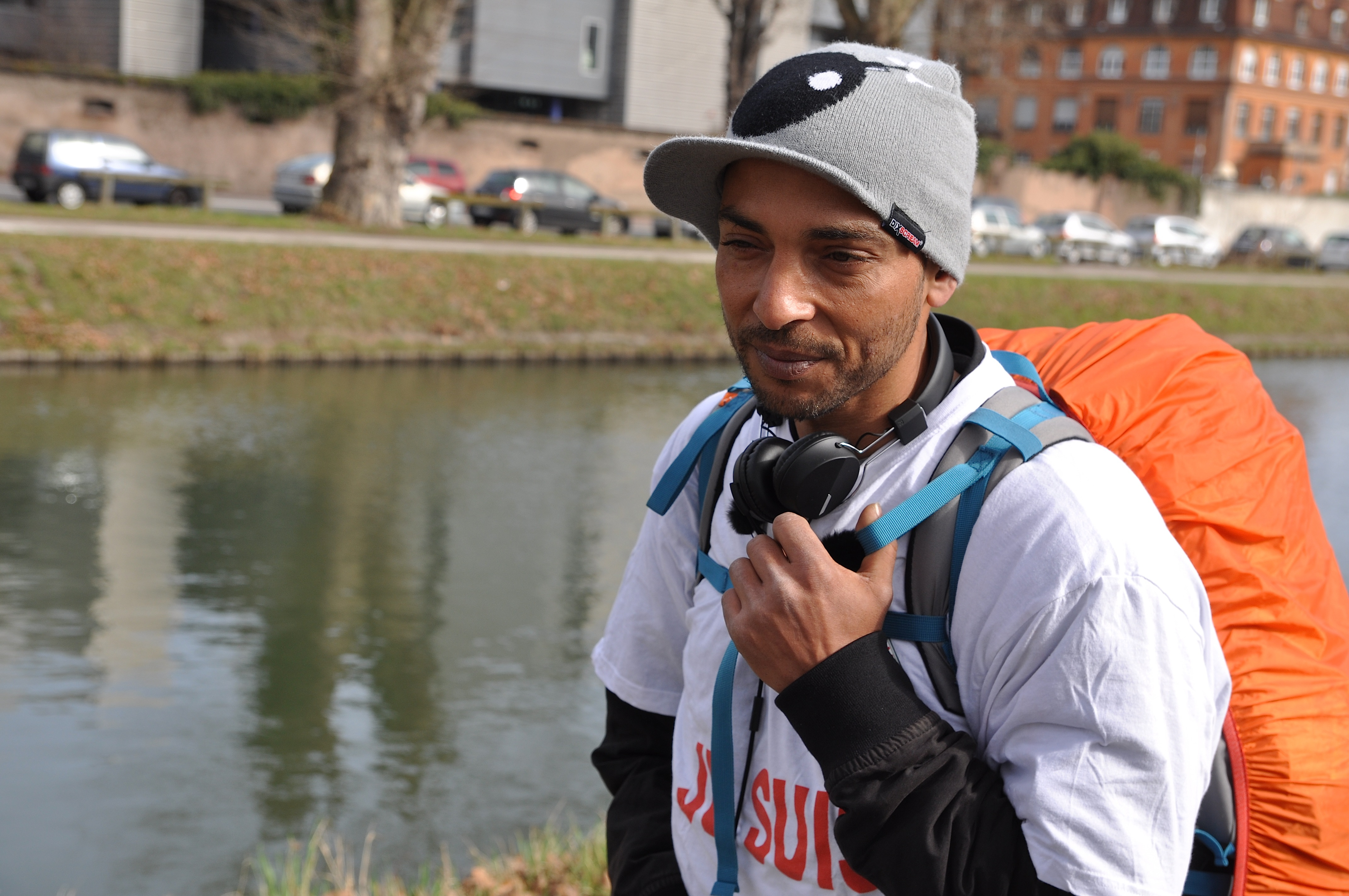
Merah's older brother Abdelghani, in Strasbourg

Mohammed Merah's older brother, Abdelghani, said that Mohammed was raised in an "atmosphere of racism and hatred." He blamed his family for Mohammed's attraction to extremist Islamism and antisemitism. Merah's sister Souad said, "I am proud of my brother. He fought until the end [...] Jews, and all those who massacre Muslims, I detest them." Abdelghani stated that, during their childhood, their mother frequently stated that Arabs were born to hate Jews, and that there may be more "Mohammed Merahs" if families were allowed to teach such hatred. In 2003, Mohammed stabbed Abdelghani seven times as the latter refused to give up his Jewish girlfriend.

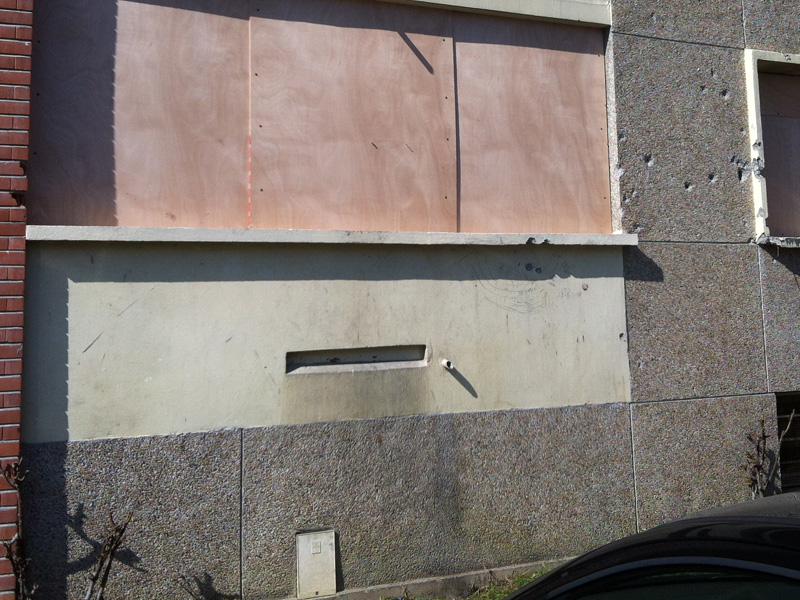
Façade of Mohammed Merah's apartment after the RAID assault

Dan Bilefsky linked Merah's anger to the high unemployment and alienation of young immigrants in France, and said this affected his development as a self-styled jihadist. Canadian journalist Rosie DiManno argued that Merah was motivated neither by religion nor the treatment of immigrants in France. She noted that while Merah had familial links with militant Islam (his mother was married to the father of Sabri Essid, who was arrested in 2007 at an al-Qaeda safe house in Syria for militants en route to Iraq), there was no evidence that Merah was involved with militant groups or even any religious congregation. DiManno characterized Merah as a sociopath who "sought posthumous grandeur" and adopted a terror agenda as a cover for his pre-existing rage.

Journalist Paul Sheehan attacked what he called progressives going into overdrive to "dissociate the violence from Islam" when it was revealed the killer was a Muslim who supported al-Qaeda. He observed that Merah had dubbed his film of the shootings with verses from the Koran invoking jihad and the greatness of Islam before he mailed it to Al-Jazeera. Merah had studied the Koran while in prison. Sheehan argues that Merah specifically targeted Muslim soldiers and Jews in a premeditated attack. President Sarkozy's intelligence adviser stated that Merah did not originally target the Jewish school, but attacked it only after arriving too late to ambush a soldier nearby.

According to Christian Etelin, Merah's lawyer since he was 16, Merah was suffering from "psychological difficulties". Etelin stated that Merah was abandoned by his father as a child, and there were reports that he split with his wife days before the attacks. Etelin denied that Merah was an Islamist. He said that Merah could have committed the shootings in an episode of "paranoid schizophrenia during which he completely disconnected from reality." Bernard Squarcini, the head of DRCI (France's domestic intelligence agency), stated, "you have to go back to his broken childhood and psychiatric troubles. To carry out what he did smacks more of a medical problem and fantasy than a simple jihadist trajectory." And yet intelligence documents later revealed that Merah had made more than 1,800 calls to over 180 contacts in 20 different countries, in addition to having made several trips to the Middle East and Afghanistan. Haaretz reported that these facts cast doubt on Squarcini's view of Merah as a solitary figure who was not part of a terrorist network.

=== Burial ===
According to older brother Abdelghani, when Merah's body was brought home, members of the local terrorist community visited the family to praise his actions and they cried tears of joy. Their only regret was that Merah had not killed more Jews. Merah was buried on 29 March 2012 in the Muslim section of the Cornebarrieu cemetery, near Toulouse. About 50 people attended, including the imam.
