= Toulouse and Montauban shootings =

Series of Islamist terrorist attacks

- Location of Toulouse and Montauban, France
- Location: Midi-Pyrénées, France: Toulouse; Montauban
- Date: 11 March 2012 – 22 March 2012
- Target: French soldiers and Jewish civilians
- Attack type: Spree shooting, school shooting, siege, mass murder, Islamic terrorism
- Weapons: .45 ACP M1911 semi-automatic pistol; Uzi submachine gun; (Used in the shooting): Three Colt M1911 pistols; AK-47 assault rifle; Sten submachine gun; Winchester 12 gauge pump-action shotgun; 9mm Glock pistol; Colt Python .357 Magnum revolver; Numerous other firearms; (Unused, found among the perpetrator car and flat)
- Deaths: 8 (including the perpetrator)
- Injuries: 11
- Perpetrator: Mohammed Merah
- Motive: Extremist Islamic beliefs; Antisemitism
- Convictions: Abdelkader Merah and Fettah Malki convicted of taking part in a criminal terrorist conspiracy

The Toulouse and Montauban shootings were a series of Islamist terrorist attacks committed by Mohammed Merah in March 2012 in the cities of Montauban and Toulouse in the Midi-Pyrénées region of France. He targeted French Army soldiers as well as children and teachers at a Jewish school. In total, seven people were killed and eleven more wounded.

Merah, a 23-year-old French criminal of Algerian descent born and raised in Toulouse, began his killing spree on 11 March, shooting an off-duty French Army paratrooper in Toulouse. On 15 March, he killed two off-duty uniformed French soldiers and seriously wounded another in Montauban. On 19 March, he opened fire at the Ozar Hatorah Jewish day school in Toulouse, killing a rabbi and three children, and also wounding four others. After the shootings, France raised its terror alert system, Vigipirate, to the highest level in the Midi-Pyrénées region and surrounding departements.

Merah, who filmed his attacks with a body-worn camera, claimed allegiance to Al-Qaeda. He said he carried out his attacks because of France's participation in the War in Afghanistan and its ban on Islamic face veils, and justified his attack on the Jewish school because "The Jews kill our brothers and sisters in Palestine". He was killed on 22 March by a police tactical unit after a 30-hour siege at his rented apartment, during which he wounded six officers. His brother and another man were later convicted of taking part in a "terrorist conspiracy" over the attacks, which were condemned by the French Council of the Muslim Faith, the United Nations and many governments around the world.

== Background of shooter ==
According to one of his brothers, unrelated with his criminal activities, Merah and his siblings were raised in an "atmosphere of racism and hatred" in their Muslim family, headed by their mother alone after their father left when Merah was young. They lived in a poor neighborhood of Toulouse. French investigators believe that Merah turned to Salafism after being imprisoned as a young man for petty crimes; he was believed to have become increasingly radical after taking two journeys to Afghanistan and Pakistan.

Merah had tried to enlist in the French Army, but was rejected because of his criminal convictions. Some sources have noted connections of Merah's family (through his mother's second marriage) to a man who was aligned with the terrorist group al-Qaeda. They also reported Merah's history of psychological issues as factors in the shootings.

Merah said he was a mujaheed and claimed ties to al-Qaeda, but French authorities found no evidence of that and denied his claim.

President Sarkozy described the attack as isolated. The police investigation found that Merah had made more than 1,800 calls to over 180 contacts in 20 different countries, in addition to having taken several trips to the Middle East and Afghanistan, and they suggested he might have been in touch with others about his planned attacks.

== Attacks ==
Locations of Toulouse shootings and police raid
1 Murder of Imad Ibn-Ziaten (11 March 2012)
2 Ozar Hatorah shooting (19 March 2012)
3 Perpetrator killed in police raid (22 March 2012)
Location of 15 March 2012 Montauban shooting

Police found that Mohammed Merah was the shooter (see below). Authorities determined that he used the same weapon in all the attacks: a .45 pistol, as well as using a 9mm pistol. In all three attacks, witnesses observed that the helmeted shooter arrived and left on the same scooter, which was found to have been stolen.

=== 11 March: paratrooper in Toulouse ===
On 11 March, Master Sergeant Imad Ibn-Ziaten, a 30-year-old off-duty French Moroccan paratrooper in the 1st Parachute Logistics Regiment (1^{er} Régiment du train parachutiste), was killed by a point-blank shot in the head in front of a middle school in Southeast Toulouse. Ibn-Ziaten was known to be waiting to meet someone who said he was interested in buying a motorcycle from him. Police suspected that the shooter set up the meeting in order to attack the paratrooper. The perpetrator was described as wearing a helmet and riding a motorcycle.

The family of Ibn-Ziaten buried him in their hometown of M'diq, Morocco.

=== 15 March: three paratroopers in Montauban ===
On Thursday, 15 March, at around 14:00, two uniformed soldiers, 25-year-old Corporal Abdel Chennouf and 23-year-old Private Mohamed Legouad, were shot and killed and a third, 27-year-old Loïc Liber, was seriously injured by shooting (and left tetraplegic) as the three were withdrawing money from a cash machine outside a shopping centre in Montauban, around 50 km north of Toulouse. They were all from the 17th Parachute Engineer Regiment (17^{e} Régiment du génie parachutiste), whose barracks are close to the town. The security cameras showed the killer riding a powerful maxi-scooter and wearing a black helmet. While taking aim, the killer reportedly pushed aside an elderly woman waiting to withdraw money from the cash machine.

=== 19 March: Ozar Hatorah school in Toulouse ===
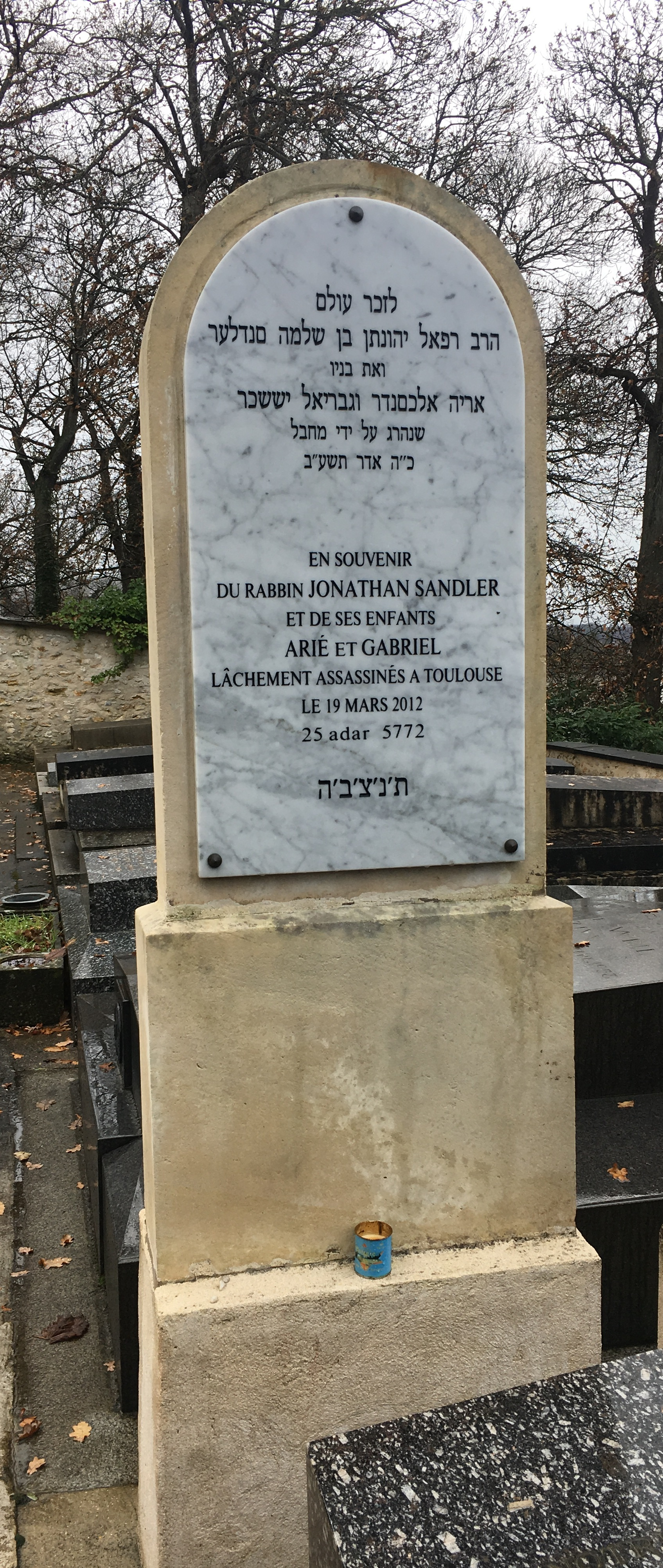
Plaque in memory of Jonathan, Arié and Gabriel Sandler in the Jewish cemetery of Versailles.

The Ozar Hatorah school in Toulouse is part of a national chain of at least twenty Jewish schools throughout France. It educates children of primarily Sephardic, Middle Eastern and North African descent, who with their parents have made up the majority of Jewish immigrants to France since the late 20th century. The school is a middle and secondary school, with most children between the ages of 11 and 17. It also serves as a transportation node for other schools. Many parents bring their younger children to Ozar Hatorah, to place them on shuttle buses that travel to the other schools in the area.

At about 8:00 am on 19 March, a man rode up to the Ozar Hatorah school on a Yamaha TMAX motorcycle. Dismounting, he immediately opened fire toward the schoolyard. The first victim was 30-year-old Jonathan Sandler, a rabbi and teacher at the school who was shot outside the school gates as he tried to shield his two young sons from the gunman. The gunman shot both the boys—5-year-old Arié and 3-year-old Gabriel—as well before walking into the schoolyard, chasing people into the building.

Inside, he shot at staff, parents, and students. He chased 8-year-old Myriam Monsonego, the daughter of the head teacher, into the courtyard, caught her by her hair and raised a gun to shoot her. The gun jammed at this point. He changed weapons from what the police identified as a 9mm pistol to a .45 calibre gun, and shot the girl in her temple at point-blank range. Bryan Bijaoui, a 17-year-old boy, was also shot and gravely injured. The gunman retrieved his scooter and rode away.

The government increased security and raised the terrorist warnings to the highest level in the Midi-Pyrenees region in the immediate aftermath of the Toulouse school shooting. The government was already providing continuous protection to many Jewish institutions, but it additionally closed traffic on streets in France with Jewish institutions for added security. Election campaigns were suspended and President Nicolas Sarkozy, as well as other candidates in the presidential elections, immediately traveled to Toulouse and the school. Sarkozy called for a minute of silence the following day in all schools in the nation.

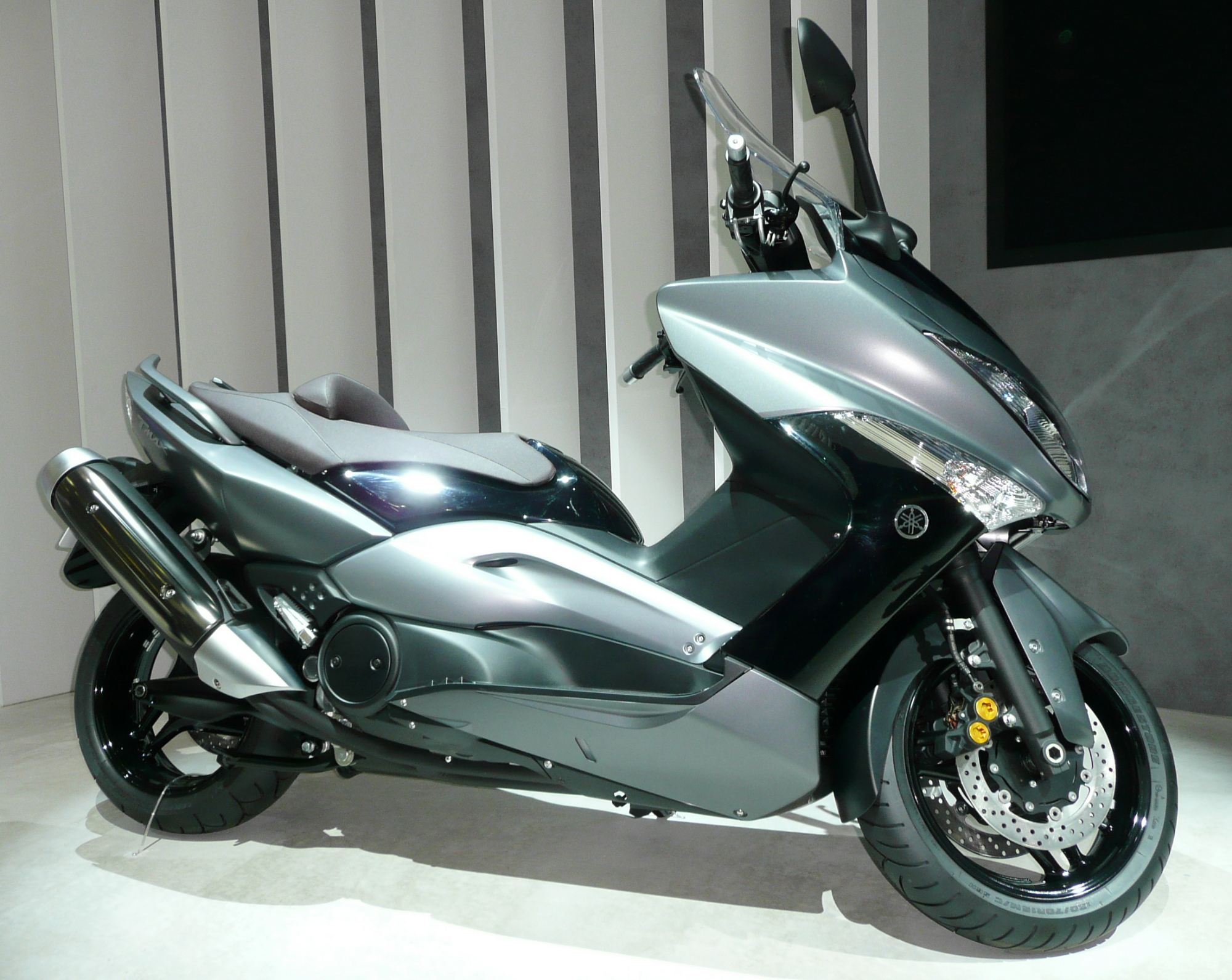
The type of scooter used in the shootings, a Yamaha TMAX.

On 23 March, Ange Mancini, intelligence adviser to President Sarkozy, said Merah had wanted to kill another soldier in Toulouse, but arrived too late and instead attacked the nearby Jewish school.

The bodies of all four dead were flown to Israel on 20 March, accompanied by French foreign minister Alain Juppé. They were buried by family members at the Har HaMenuchot cemetery in Jerusalem. The two deceased children of Jonathan Sandler were dual French-Israeli citizens, as are Sandler's widow and their surviving child.

=== 19 to 22 March: manhunt ===
Departements where Vigipirate terror alert was raised to its highest level

The police conducted a large manhunt. They erected roadblocks in Toulouse and placed extra security outside Jewish and Islamic schools across France. Because of the ethnic identities of the victims, all of whom were of Jewish, North African or Afro-Caribbean descent, police initially suspected the involvement of neo-Nazis, who have expressed opposition to all these ethnic groups. Since Merah had previously drawn little police or security attention, police did not initially identify him as a suspect, even as he committed more murders. Merah cleaned the magazine and shell casings he left to prevent identification of fingerprints or DNA.

The search for Sergeant Ibn Ziaten's bogus motorbike buyer began to home in on Merah's computer, as cross-checks revealed that the Toulouse woman who owned the IP address had two sons on the government's anti-terrorism watchlist. Merah asked a motorcycle mechanic in Toulouse about removing a GPS anti-theft tracking device on his bike, and told the mechanic he had just repainted the bike white. The mechanic alerted the police to Merah's actions, who identified the motorcycle as the one used in the attacks.

=== 22 March: siege and perpetrator's death ===
An hour before police surrounded his apartment, Merah called the French television channel France 24. Ebba Kalondo, the editor who spoke with him, reported that Merah suggested his "acts were not only necessary, but that they were to uphold the honour of Islam." According to Kalondo, "He said he was in connection with al Qaeda, that what he had done was only the beginning. He said he was against the French ban on face covering and fought against the French participation in operations of NATO in Afghanistan."

At 03:00 local time (02:00 UTC), the French police tried to arrest Merah at his apartment on Rue du Sergent Vigné in the Côte Pavée neighborhood of Toulouse. Merah shot at the police through the door, injuring three police officers in the process.

The elite police counter terrorism unit, French: Recherche Assistance Intervention Dissuasion ("Research, Assistance, Intervention, Deterrence" – RAID), surrounded the 1960s-era five-storey block of flats soon after. Merah was later found to have been armed with an AK-47, an Uzi, a Sten, a Winchester 12 gauge pump-action shotgun, three M1911s, a 9mm Glock, and a Colt Python .357 Magnum. The police found additional weapons in a rented Renault Mégane parked near the apartment building. Authorities evacuated the five-storey building block and nearby buildings, and trained powerful spotlights on Merah's building in an attempt to blind him and prevent him from observing police operations. They cut off electricity and gas supplies to the apartment block, and switched off the street lights in the neighbourhood.

Merah exchanged a M1911 for a walkie-talkie as arranged by police; he told them the location of a bag containing the camera used to film his attacks. The police also arrested one of Merah's brothers; another turned himself into custody. Police found weapons and explosives in his brother's car. His mother was brought to the scene to help with negotiations, but she refused to become involved, due to her lack of influence on Merah.

Merah informed the police that he intended to give himself up at 22:45. Contact was established with him at that time, but Merah said that he would not give up without a fight and would kill policemen if necessary. In the late evening of 21 March, blasts were heard at the apartment block, which were intended to intimidate Merah into surrendering. The police blew off the window shutters with a grenade, after which two shots were heard. After that there was no response from Merah until 11:00 the next day. The police continued the explosions at regular intervals, in an effort to wear Merah down. Officers did not know if Merah was alive, as he did not respond to the series of explosions during the night and on Thursday morning.

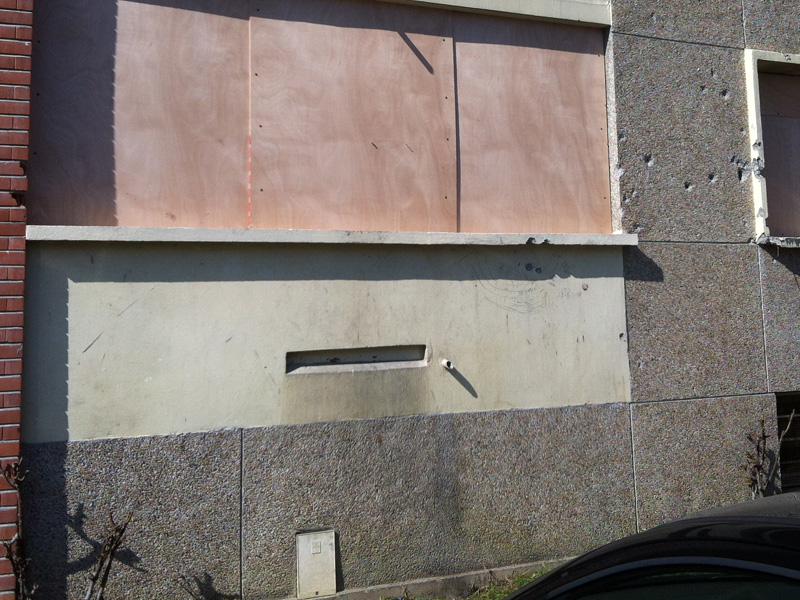
Façade of Merah's apartment.

At 10:30 on 22 March, the police decided to arrest Merah. They threw grenades into the apartment but there was no response. A team of 15 specially trained counter terrorism operators decided to enter the flat first by the door, then using the windows, whose shutters had been removed during the night. The team deployed technical devices and video equipment to inspect the different rooms. No presence was detected until a device was introduced into the bathroom. At that point, Merah emerged, shooting long and frequent bursts. The officers returned fire and snipers opposite attempted to neutralise him. Merah jumped out of the window with weapon in hand and continued to shoot. Merah was shot in the head by a police sniper and was found dead on the ground.

Less than one hour later, authorities announced to media in Toulouse that Merah was dead. Merah's death was later confirmed by President Sarkozy. Agence France-Presse reported that three police officers had been injured in the exchanges of gunfire, one of whom sustained "fairly serious" wounds. Merah was found to have a bulletproof vest, components of Molotov cocktails, and weapons parts stockpiled inside his flat.

During the standoff with police, Merah told police that he intended to keep on attacking, and he loved death the way the police loved life. Police have not substantiated his claim of having connections with Al-Qaeda.

== Perpetrator ==
Mohammed Merah
- Born: 10 October 1988; Toulouse, France
- Died: 22 March 2012 (aged 23); Toulouse, France
- Citizenship: France
- Occupation: Mechanic
- Organization: Al-Qaeda (disputed)
- Parent(s): Zoulika Aziri (mother); Mohamed Benalel Merah (father)

Mohammed Merah (Arabic: محمد مراح; 10 October 1988 – 22 March 2012) was born to French parents of Algerian descent.

=== Filming ===
Merah filmed all of the killings using a GoPro camera strapped to his body. He made a video of them set to music and verses of the Koran. He sent the video to news agency Al Jazeera. After a request from French President Nicolas Sarkozy, Al Jazeera decided against airing the video. One video shows Merah shooting two French Muslim soldiers in Montauban, and shouting Allahu Akbar.

=== Motivation ===
Prior to the identification of Merah as the attacker, French President Nicolas Sarkozy said that the antisemitic nature of the Jewish school attack appeared obvious. After Merah was identified, Sarkozy stated that "the Islamic faith has nothing to do with the insane motivations of this man," and others have repeated this view. Merah admitted antisemitic motivations for his attack during the siege with police.

Some media have described Merah as an "Islamic terrorist". Merah said that he resented France's ban on women wearing the burqa, and that "the Jews have killed our brothers and sisters in Palestine."

He also wanted to avenge the French Army's involvement in the war in Afghanistan. An editor at France 24 reported that Merah told him that these acts were not only necessary, but that they were to "uphold the honour of Islam". During the murders, Merah said, "you killed my brothers, I kill you." Journalist Ed West described this as an expression of tribalism, not religion.

Mohammed Merah's older brother, Abdelghani, said that Mohammed was raised in an "atmosphere of racism and hatred." He blamed his family for Mohammed's attraction to extremist Islamism and antisemitism. Merah's sister Souad said, "I am proud of my brother. He fought until the end... Jews, and all those who massacre Muslims, I detest them." Abdelghani stated that, during their childhood, their mother frequently stated that Arabs were born to hate Jews, and that there may be more "Mohammed Merahs" if families were allowed to teach such hatred. In 2003, another brother, Abdelkader, stabbed Abdelghani seven times as the latter refused to give up his Jewish girlfriend and developed a drinking problem.

Dan Bilefsky linked Merah's anger to the high unemployment and alienation of young immigrants in France, and said this affected his development as a self-styled jihadist. Canadian journalist Rosie DiManno argued that Merah was motivated neither by religion nor the treatment of immigrants in France. She noted that while Merah had familial links with militant Islam (his mother was married to the father of Sabri Essid, who was arrested in 2007 at an al-Qaeda safe house in Syria for militants en route to Iraq), there was no evidence that Merah was involved with militant groups or even any religious congregation. DiManno characterized Merah as a sociopath who "sought posthumous grandeur" and adopted a terror agenda as a cover for his pre-existing rage.

Journalist Paul Sheehan attacked what he called progressives going into overdrive to "dissociate the violence from Islam" when it was revealed the killer was a Muslim who supported al-Qaeda. He observed that Merah had dubbed his film of the shootings with verses from the Koran invoking jihad and the greatness of Islam before he mailed it to Al-Jazeera. Merah had studied the Koran while in prison. Sheehan argues that Merah specifically targeted Muslim soldiers and Jews in a premeditated attack. President Sarkozy's intelligence adviser stated that Merah did not originally target the Jewish school, but attacked it only after arriving too late to ambush a soldier nearby.

According to Christian Etelin, Merah's lawyer since he was 16, Merah had "psychological difficulties". Etelin stated that Merah was abandoned by his father as a child, and there were reports that he split with by his wife days before the attacks. Etelin denied that Merah was an Islamist. He said that Merah could have committed the shootings in an episode of "paranoid schizophrenia during which he completely disconnected from reality." Bernard Squarcini, the head of DRCI (France's domestic intelligence agency), stated, "you have to go back to his broken childhood and psychiatric troubles. To carry out what he did smacks more of a medical problem and fantasy than a simple jihadist trajectory."

Intelligence documents later showed Mohamed Merah had made more than 1,800 calls to over 180 contacts in 20 different countries, in addition to having made several trips to the Middle East and Afghanistan. Haaretz reported that these facts cast doubt on Squarcini's view of Merah as a solitary figure who was not part of a terrorist network.

== Reactions ==
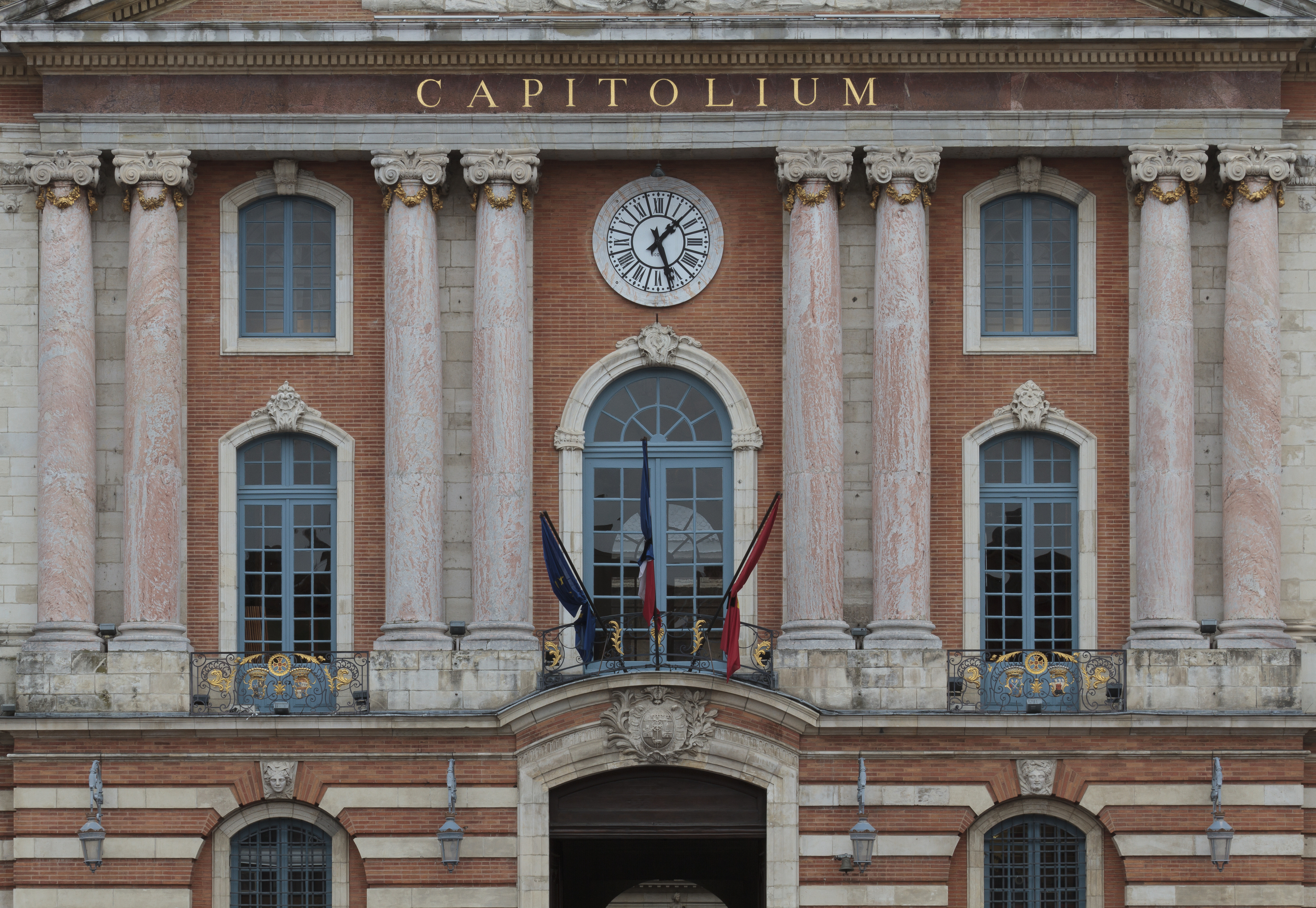
Mourning flags of the European Union, France and Midi-Pyrénées on the Capitole de Toulouse after the attacks.

The attacks were condemned by many governments around the world. The United Nations condemned the killings "in the strongest possible terms," and the French Council of the Muslim Faith also condemned the attacks.

In a speech to Palestinian youths at an UNRWA event, the European Union's High Representative Baroness Ashton said, "When we think about what happened today in Toulouse, we remember what happened in Norway a year ago, when we know what is happening in Syria, and we see what is happening in Gaza and Sderot and in different parts of the world – we remember young people and children who lose their lives."

Israeli ministers harshly criticised her comparison of the Toulouse murders to the situation in Gaza. Prime Minister Benjamin Netanyahu said, "It is unthinkable to compare a massacre and the Israeli army's surgical, defensive actions against those who use children as human shields." Lady Ashton said that the press reporting of her speech was "grossly distorted" and that had she also referred to Israeli victims in Sderot, but this had been incorrectly omitted from the original transcript.

The Palestinian Authority condemned the attacks as "racist crimes". Palestinian Prime Minister Salam Fayyad said terrorists must stop trying to justify their acts of violence "in the name of Palestine."

=== Reactions in French society ===
On 19 March, the date of the attack on the Jewish school, President Sarkozy declared the date to be "a day of national tragedy." Both Sarkozy and Francois Hollande condemned the attacks. On 20 March, cities across France observed a minute's silence in remembrance of the victims at the Jewish school. Dalil Boubakeur, Rector of the Grand Mosque of Paris, condemned the attacks. Gilles Bernheim, the Chief Rabbi of France, called for strengthening the links between Jewish and Muslim communities. According to Rabbi Marc Schneier, thousands of Muslims and Jews joined in solidarity marches throughout Paris.

Many Jewish children in France were afraid to go to school after the shootings, and Jewish teenagers reported fears of dressing in a recognisably Jewish manner. Some Israeli politicians called on French Jews to emigrate to Israel to escape the anti-Semitism in France.

A number of French media questioned the role of the security services during the operation and whether more could have been done to prevent the killings. French counter-terrorism expert Christian Prouteau criticised the siege operation, saying tear gas might have been used to capture Merah alive and reduce the chance he could attack police.

Nicholas Vancour reported that the reaction in Les Izards, a "sensitive urban zone" with a large Arab Muslim population where Mohamed Merah grew up, was to regard Merah to be "one of their own, no matter what he did." One woman was supportive of Merah's family; a family friend of the Merahs expressed sympathy for him, but said she did not condone his actions. A group of twenty youths accosted the police, and Mohamed Redha Ghezali, a 20-year-old man from the neighbourhood, was sentenced to three months in prison for praising Merah's actions. The man while haranguing police officers had said, "My friend Mohamed is a real man – too bad he wasn't able to finish the job." He was convicted of "provoking racial hatred" and "apology for terrorism," and the Toulouse prosecutor stated that France would "systematically pursue" people expressing support for Merah. Some young men of the neighbourhood found conspiracy theories more convincing than that one of their own could be a killer. A movement is under way to mount a demonstration in support of the imprisoned Abdelkader Merah, who faces charges of complicity in murder and conspiracy to commit acts of terrorism.

Mohammed Merah's older brother, Abdelghani, later wrote a book condemning the hero-worship of Mohamed among some young French Muslims. He recalled "whoops of joy" and that people were congratulating his mother at the wake for Mohammed.

=== Rallies ===
On 19 March, several thousand people marched silently in Paris in memory of the victims of the shootings. On 24 March, hundreds of people gathered in Lyon and Rouen, to pay tribute to the victims in silent marches. Many held signs saying "We will never forget". In Toulouse, 6,000 people marched on 25 March, including mayor Pierre Cohen, Chief Rabbi of France Gilles Bernheim, and Hassen Chalghoumi, the imam at Drancy.

Small demonstrations honouring Merah were held on housing estates, including in his hometown of Toulouse. A small rally of around 30 people held in Toulouse in tribute of Merah was dispersed by French police. The AGI reported that most protesters were young women wearing the burka, which is banned in France in public places. Several people acquainted with the killer attempted to leave flowers outside his flat. Members of the group said this was a gesture to restore dignity to the Muslim community of Toulouse and Merah's family and was not an attempt to vindicate Merah; others said that they did not wish to judge him harshly and that the vilification of Merah was unfair. The New York Times quoted Pierre Cohen, the mayor of Toulouse, stating that rumours of Muslims organizing a demonstration for Merah were "false". Graffiti in Toulouse read "Viva Merah", "Vengeance" and "Fuck the kippa" before being cleaned.

=== Criticism of media ===
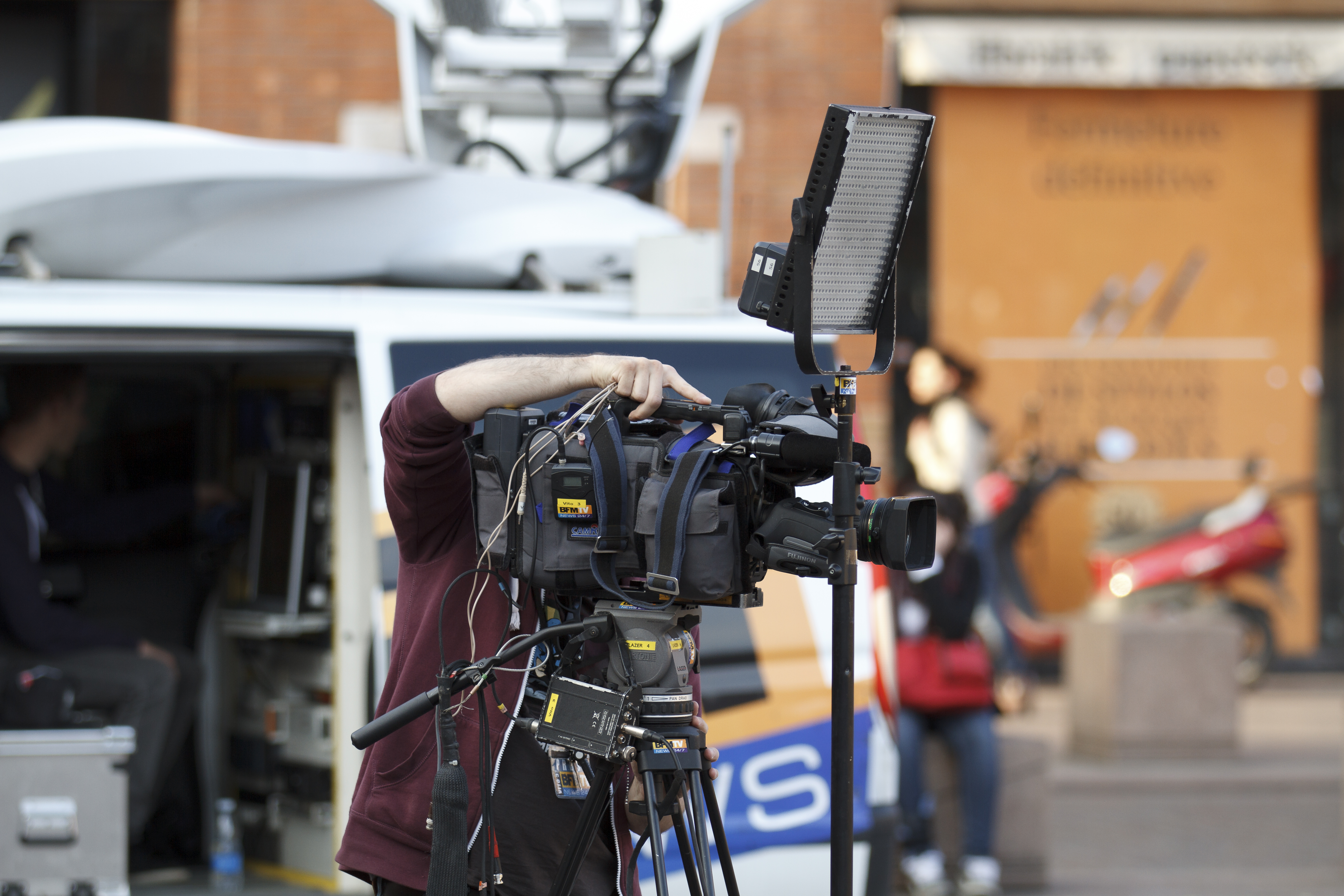
A news camera in the centre of Toulouse after the shootings.

Joel Braunold criticised the "airbrushing [of] anti-Semitism out of the Toulouse attack" and the view that Merah was "imbued neither with the values of Islam, or driven by racism and anti-Semitism." He criticised the "dehumanization of Merah's victims" and the way in which some have interpreted the killings as a symbol of attacking society in general. He was disturbed at the "inabilities of some to even mention anti-Semitism as a cause" despite the fact that some of Merah's victims were not random and were Jews.

The media were also criticized for incorrectly labeling far-right groups as the perpetrators before the attacker was known.

== Aftermath ==
=== Fears of backlash ===
In the aftermath, many French Muslims feared the stigmatization of the Muslim community and an increase in Islamophobia. President Sarkozy also warned against stigmatizing millions of French Muslims because of the actions of a single extremist.

=== Internet law proposal ===
President Sarkozy proposed a new law that would imprison those who repeatedly visit websites promoting terror or hatred. According to The Times of India, legal experts are concerned that such a law could curtail freedom of speech. Reporters Without Borders accused Sarkozy of trying to create an internet surveillance system.

=== Antisemitic incidents ===
The French Jewish community documented 90 anti-Semitic incidents in the 10 days after Merah's attack. The Service of Protecting the Jewish community (Service de Protection de la Communauté Juive (SPCJ)) recorded 148 anti-Semitic incidents in March and April, with forty-three of those classified as violent. The authorities also recorded 105 instances of anti-Semitic intimidation and threats during those two months. Jewish graves were vandalised in Nice. The SPCJ said the situation was "deeply worrisome" and reflected support for Merah's attack. Interior Minister Manuel Valls held a meeting with Jewish representatives, promising increased protection for Jewish institutions in France.

The French police investigated email and telephone threats received by staff at the school in the days following the attacks. On 26 March, a 12-year-old boy was hit and punched in the back of his head as he left his Ozar Hatorah school in Paris "by youths reciting anti-Semitic slogans". In one attack, a Jewish man and his friend were attacked by people identifying themselves as Palestinians, who promised to "exterminate" the Jews. In Villeurbanne, three youths wearing Jewish skullcaps were leaving a Jewish school when they were attacked with a hammer and iron bars. Incoming French Prime Minister Jean-Marc Ayrault described the attack as "intolerable violence".

=== Co-conspirators ===
Mohamed Merah's 29-year-old brother, Abdelkader Merah, was detained after the death of his brother and faced preliminary charges of complicity in murder and conspiracy to commit acts of terrorism. Investigators believed that he may have assisted Mohamed with the preparation of the killings. Abdelkader's lawyer denied these allegations, saying that press reports that Abdelkader expressed pride in his brother's acts were false, and that he had not been aware of Mohamed's plans. In Les Izards, where some planned to mount a demonstration in support of Abdelkader, many find the idea of an organised plot by the Merahs to be absurd.

In 2017, Abdelkader Merah was found guilty of "taking part in a criminal terrorist conspiracy". He was sentenced to 20 years in jail. Fettah Malki was found guilty of the same crime and sentenced to 14 years in jail.

=== Arrest and expulsion of Jihadists ===
In dawn raids in Toulouse and other cities, police arrested 19 suspected militants connected to Forsane Alizza. According to the BBC, the arrests appeared to be in response to the shootings. The arrested individuals were suspected of inciting violence and terrorism, according to the daily Le Parisien. CNN and the BBC reported that French authorities did not link any of those arrested to Merah. The French prosecutor has denied any link between the arrests, which were the product of an investigation begun in October 2011, and the shootings. President Sarkozy also said the arrests were not directly linked to Mohammed Merah.

In discussing alienation and Les Izards, Nicholas Vinocur writes, "The fear is, there may be more Mohamed Merahs in waiting among Europe's largest Muslim community, of some five million people in France – a worry that may partly explain Friday's roundup of 19 suspected militant Islamists as Sarkozy's government asserts a firm grip on security." Professor Olivier Roy doubts that disenfranchised youth are vulnerable to terrorism, writing that "For every Qaeda sympathizer there are thousands of Muslims who don the French Army uniform and fight under the French flag."

Sarkozy requested that the police increase its surveillance of "radical Islam" amid rising concerns of a jihadist threat in France. There were suggestions that the government and DCRI were intensifying efforts to deal with suspected militants after being criticised for allowing Merah to slip through the net. The domestic intelligence agency seized several firearms, including five rifles, four automatic weapons and three Kalashnikovs, as well as a bulletproof vest, during the raids. French officials said that two radical Islamists were deported and three more are to be expelled. French Interior Minister Claude Gueant said that the two deported were a Malian imam who had preached anti-Semitism and promoted wearing the burka, and Ali Belhadad, an Algerian with involvement in a 1994 Marrakech attack. Two imams from Saudi Arabia and Turkey and a suspected Tunisian militant are also due for expulsion from France. A police source stated that some of the arrested were planning to kidnap a Jewish magistrate.

On 4 April, French police arrested 10 people on suspicion that they were "Islamist militants". On 5 April, four of them were released after prosecutors found insufficient evidence to detain them. On 6 April, there were reports that the French police would release the last six individuals as well.

The Interior minister commented "We do not accept Islamic extremism. This is not a new policy... but after what happened in Toulouse and Montauban we have to be more vigilant than ever." President Sarkozy said the aim was to deny the entry of certain people to France who did not share the country's values and that, "It's not just linked to Toulouse. It's all over the country. It's in connection with a form of radical Islam." He added that "more suspected Muslim extremists will be rounded up," and that after the traumatic events in Montauban and Toulouse, it was necessary to "draw some conclusions."

The government banned six Islamist leaders from entering France for a Muslim conference expected to be held in Paris.

== See also ==
- Antisemitism in 21st-century France
- Charlie Hebdo shooting
- Christchurch mosque shootings, also filmed with a GoPro
- List of Islamist terrorist attacks
- List of terrorist incidents in France
- Terrorism in the European Union
- Mon Frère, ce terroriste (My brother the terrorist)
- Fabien Clain mentor, friend and terrorist recruiter
- Cannes-Torcy cell
- Grasse school shooting, the second school shooting to occur in France, after the Ozar Hatorah shooting
