= Chahdortt Djavann =

Iranian-born French novelist

- شهدخت جوان
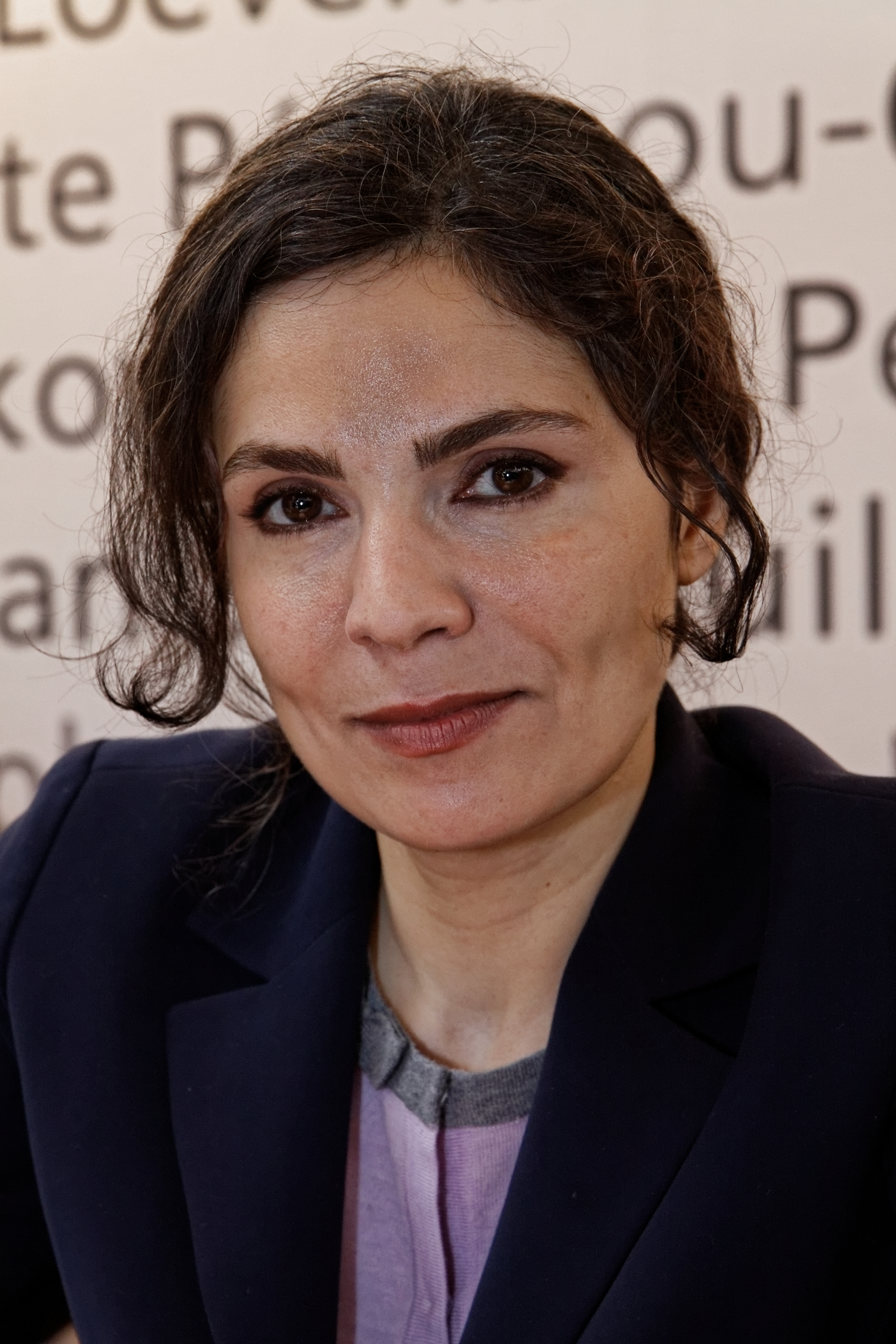
- Djavann (2012) in Paris
- Born: 1967 (age 58–59); Iran
- Education: School for Advanced Studies in the Social Sciences
- Occupations: Contemporary writer, novelist, essayist

Chahdortt Djavann (Persian: شهدخت جوان; born 1967) is an Iranian-born French contemporary writer, novelist, and essayist. Her works frequently address identity and memory, and she has been an outspoken critic of Iran's leaders. She regularly appears on French television and radio.

In Bas les voiles! (Gallimard, 2003), Djavann was among the first writers to speak out against compulsory veiling, particularly the compulsory veiling of schoolgirls in Iran.

== Biography ==
Chahdortt Djavann was born in Iran in 1967. Her family was of Azerbaijani descent and belonged to an aristocratic lineage. She left Iran in 1991, moving first to Turkey and then to France in 1993. She attended the School for Advanced Studies in the Social Sciences (École des Hautes Études en Sciences Sociales) in Paris.

Djavann has spoken publicly about immigration and assimilation. In January 2006, she appeared on the French television program Culture et Dépendances, where she discussed “assimilation as liberation.”

Her novel Comment peut-on être français ? (Flammarion, 2006) is a partly epistolary social and political satire. It takes the form of an imaginary correspondence with Montesquieu, alluding to his Lettres persanes (1721). Djavann explores the possibility of becoming French by making the French language her own: the novel's protagonist “wanted to live in French—to suffer, laugh, cry, love, fantasize, hope, and lose herself in French. She wanted French to live within her.”

Her novel La Muette (Flammarion, 2008) presents the confession of a fifteen-year-old girl sentenced to death by hanging in a prison of the Islamic Republic of Iran. The novel was translated into German, Dutch, Italian, Spanish, Portuguese, and Romanian.

In the epilogue to Je ne suis pas celle que je suis (Flammarion, 2011), Djavann writes: “Nothing was less likely than exile in France; nothing destined me for a French life.… Even in my boldest dreams, I could never have imagined becoming a French-language writer.” Although she draws upon some of her own experiences, she adds: “I do not believe in autobiography.… I am my character, and I am not.”

La Dernière Séance (Fayard, 2013) is the sequel to Je ne suis pas celle que je suis. It interweaves accounts of psychoanalytic sessions in Paris with the story of the protagonist's turbulent journey from Istanbul to Paris. Both novels address exile, identity, otherness, and psychoanalysis.

Big Daddy (Grasset, 2015) is a social thriller set in the rural United States. It portrays a manipulative, grandiose criminal who takes a homeless boy under his wing, as well as a lawyer from an affluent Iranian-American family.

Djavann's novel Les putes voilées n’iront jamais au Paradis ! (Grasset, 2016) gives a voice to sex workers murdered in Iran.

Her novel Et ces êtres sans pénis ! (Grasset, 2021) was described by Le Monde as displaying “irresistible intelligence and humor.”

In her novel Un violeur attentionné et délicat (Grasset, 2026), Djavann gives voice to a senior official of the mullahs’ regime who has been sentenced to life imprisonment following the fall of the Islamic Republic. In an extended monologue, the criminal recounts his impoverished childhood, his incestuous passion for his half-sister, his service in the Iranian army during the war against Iraq, his indoctrination, and his subsequent rise to the position of judge, in which capacity he sentences dozens of protesters to death. Cunning and malevolent, he imagines himself to be an “Iranian Talleyrand.” He exploits his position to seduce and abuse young women imprisoned under his authority.

Djavann has written numerous opinion pieces for Le Monde and Le Figaro.

In an interview published in Le Figaro on June 10, 2026, she stated: “Totalitarian systems use shared social norms, domestic violence, and customary practices to consolidate their power.”

Her work has attracted both praise and criticism. In the 2009 research article "French New Orientalist Narratives from the 'Natives': Reading More Than Chahdortt Djavann in Paris," published in the academic journal Comparative Studies of South Asia, Africa and the Middle East, Laetitia Nanquette characterized Djavann’s writing as an example of “self-orientalism.”

Djavann received the Grand Prix de la Laïcité in 2003 from the Comité Laïcité République. In 2004, she was appointed a Chevalier (Knight) of the Ordre des Arts et des Lettres.

Chahdortt Djavann was the guest of honor and delivered the opening address at the Joan of Arc Festival, held annually on May 8 in Orléans.

== Publications ==
- Djavann, Chahdortt (2002). Je viens d'ailleurs [I Come from Elsewhere] (in French). Autrement. Gallimard, Folio (2005). ISBN 978-2070300358. (Translated into German, Parvaneh Heisst Schmetterling; and Italian, Vengo da altrove)
- Djavann, Chahdortt (2003). Bas les voiles ! [Down with the Veils!] (in French). Gallimard, Folio. ISBN 9782070321056. (Translated into Italian, Spanish, Danish, German, and Portuguese)
- Djavann, Chahdortt (2004). Que pense Allah de l'Europe ? [What Does Allah Think of Europe?] (in French). Gallimard. ISBN 978-2070772025. (Translated into German and Italian)
- Djavann, Chahdortt (2004). Abajo el velo! [Down with the Veil!] (in Spanish). El Aleph Editores. ISBN 978-8-476-69670-5.
- Djavann, Chahdortt (2004). Autoportrait de l'autre [Self-Portrait of the Other] (in French). Sabine Wespieser Éditeur / Gallimard, Folio. ISBN 978-2070360222.
- Djavann, Chahdortt (2006). Comment peut-on être Français ? [How Can You Be French?] (in French). Flammarion. ISBN 2-080689169. Translated into Japanese.
- Djavann, Chahdortt (2007). À mon corps défendant, l'Occident [Against My Will, the West] (in French). Flammarion. ISBN 978-2081200999.
- Djavann, Chahdortt (2007). L'alphabet de l'espoir: les écrivains s'engagent [The Alphabet of Hope: Writers Take a Stand] (in French). UNESCO.
- Djavann, Chahdortt (June 2007). "Islamismen truer demokratiet" [Islamism Threatens Democracy]. Udenrigs (in Danish) (2). doi:10.7146/udernigs.v0i2.119529 (inactive 11 July 2025).
- Djavann, Chahdortt (2007). Pour une littérature-monde [For a World Literature] (in French). Gallimard. ISBN 978-2070785308.
- Djavann, Chahdortt (2008). La Muette [The Mute Girl] (in French). Flammarion. ISBN 978-2081210530. Translated into German, Dutch, Italian, Spanish, Portuguese, and Romanian.
- Djavann, Chahdortt (2009). Ne négociez pas avec le Régime iranien [Do Not Negotiate with the Iranian Regime] (in French). Flammarion. ISBN 978-2081233614.
- Djavann, Chahdortt; Halling, Kirsten (2010). "Entretien avec Chahdortt Djavann [An Interview with Chahdortt Djavann]". Dalhousie French Studies. 92 (1): 139–144. ISSN 0711-8813. JSTOR 41705542.
- Djavann, Chahdortt (2010). De Zwijgster [The Mute Girl] (in Dutch). Sirene. ISBN 978-9058314987.
- Djavann, Chahdortt (2011). Je ne suis pas celle que je suis [I Am Not the Woman I Am] (in French). Flammarion. ISBN 978-208122754-5.
- Djavann, Chahdortt (2013). La dernière séance: voyage au bout de l'inconscient [The Last Session: Journey to the End of the Unconscious] (in French). Fayard. ISBN 978-2213677569.
- Djavann, Chahdortt (2012). Die Stumme. Das Taschenhörbuch [The Mute Woman. Audiobook] (in German). Steinbach Sprechende. ISBN 978-3869741147.
- Chahdortt, Djavann (2015). Big Daddy (in French). Grasset. ISBN 978-2246851783. Translated into Dutch.
- Djavann, Chahdortt (2016). Les putes voilées n'iront jamais au paradis ! [Veiled Whores Will Never Go to Heaven!] (in French). Grasset. ISBN 978-2246856979.
- Chahdortt, Djavann (2016). Comment lutter efficacement contre l'idéologie Islamique [How to Effectively Combat Islamic Ideology] (in French). Grasset. ISBN 978-2246862987.
- Djavann, Chahdortt (2016). Meester [Bid Daddy] (in Dutch). Cargo. ISBN 978-9023494799.
- Djavann, Chahdortt (2018). Iran j'accuse ! [Iran, I Accuse!] (in French). Grasset. ISBN 978-2246818885.
- Djavann, Chahdortt (2021). Et ces êtres sans pénis ! [And Those Beings without Penises!] (in French). Grasset. ISBN 978-2246813682.
- Djavann, Chahdortt (2026). Un violeur attentionné et délicat [A Considerate and Gentle Rapist] (in French). Grasset. ISBN 978-2246830399.

== See also ==
- Négar Djavadi
- Fariba Hachtroudi
- Michel Houellebecq
- Delphine Minoui
- Marjane Satrapi
- Abnousse Shalmani
- Mohamed Sifaoui
