= Mon frère, ce terroriste =

Book by Mohamed Sifaoui & Abdelghani Merah

First edition (publ. Calmann-Lévy)

Mon frère, ce terroriste ("My brother, that terrorist") is a book written by Mohamed Sifaoui and Abdelghani Merah, the elder brother of Mohammed Merah, who murdered seven people, including three Jewish children at a school in Toulouse. Abdelghani said he wrote the book to counteract the veneration of his brother by some young French Muslims, and in it, he denounces his family for fostering an "atmosphere of racism and hatred" that led to Mohammed's radicalisation and eventual attacks.

== His family ==
Abdelghani condemns his family for creating a culture of hatred, and states that his brother's main motivation for the attacks was the antisemitism espoused by his family. He recalls that his mother told them throughout their childhood that Arabs were born to hate Jews. According to Merah, "my brother lived in a family that predestined him at best to delinquency and at worst to terrorism." His family supported the activities of the Islamic Salvation Front and the Armed Islamic Group, both banned terrorist organisations. He states that both of his nephews are being taught hatred of infidels, and are shown videos of jihad.

== Reactions to Mohammed's attack ==
Abdelghani said that he wrote the book to resist the hero-worship of his brother among some young French Muslims. He recalls the jubilation at his brother's wake and recounts that people were congratulating his mother saying, "Be proud. Your son brought France to its knees". Abdelgani later filmed his sister saying, "Mohamed had the courage to act. I am proud, proud, proud...Jews, and all those who massacre Muslims, I detest them." Abdelgani has now severed all contact with his family and says he thinks regularly of the victims of the massacre and each day looks at their photos which he downloaded on his phone.

== See also ==
- Mohammed Merah
- Toulouse and Montauban shootings
