= Mohamed Sifaoui =

Algerian-French journalist and writer (born 1967)

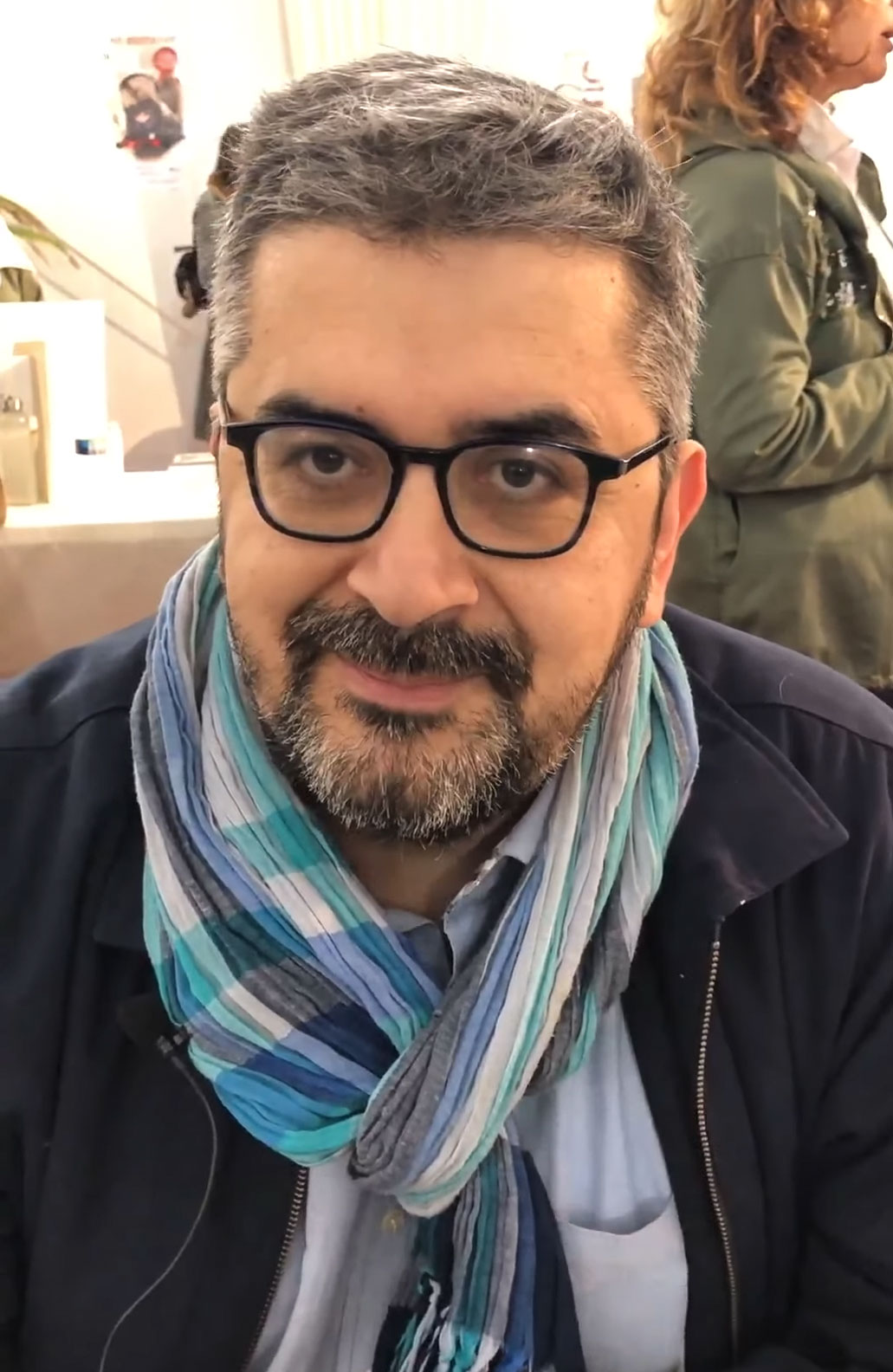
- Born: July 4, 1967 (age 59)
- Occupations: Journalist and writer

Mohamed Sifaoui (in Arabic محمد سيفاوي) (born 4 July 1967) is an Algerian-French journalist and writer who claimed that he managed to infiltrate al-Qaeda. He wrote a book about the experience, Mes "frères" assassins. Comment j'ai infiltré une cellule d'Al-Qaïda (meaning My assassin "brothers": How I infiltrated an al-Qaeda cell). Many journalists criticize his ethics as his TV documentaries relate fictive situations and are polemical staging. Sifaoui has also been reprimanded by the Conseil supérieur de l'audiovisuel, the institution regulating the French media, for several racist comments related to the case of Estelle Mouzin ("un restaurateur asiatique mis en cause, à tort, par Mohammed Sifaoui, dans la disparition de la petite Estelle Mouzin").

Regardless of the controversy around his work, Mohammed Sifaoui has written a series of studies on Islamism, especially in France, highly informative for some but very questionable for others.

== Bibliography ==
- La France malade de l'islamisme. Editions du Cherche Midi 2002. ISBN 2-7491-0027-5
- Mes "frères" assassins. Comment j'ai infiltré une cellule d'Al-Qaïda. Editions du Cherche Midi 2003. ISBN 2-7491-0086-0
- Sur les traces de Ben Laden. Editions du Cherche Midi 2004. ISBN 2-7491-0266-9
- Lettre aux islamistes de France et de Navarre. Editions du Cherche Midi 2004. ISBN 2-7491-0287-1
- L'Affaire des caricatures. Dessins et Manipulations. Edition Privé 2006. ISBN 2-35076-031-6
- Combattre le terrorisme islamiste. Editions Grasset 2007. ISBN 978-2-246-70561-1
- J'ai infiltré le milieu asiatique. Editions du Cherche Midi 2008. ISBN 978-2-7491-1182-7
- Éric Zemmour, une supercherie française, Armand Colin 2010. ISBN 978-2200255596
- AQMI, Le groupe terroriste qui menace la France, Encre d'Orient, 2010. ISBN 978-2362430053
- Bouteflika, ses parrains et ses larbins, Encre d'Orient, 2011. ISBN 978-2362430244
- Histoire secrète de l'Algérie indépendante, Nouveau Monde, 2012. ISBN 978-2-84736-642-6
- Mon frère, ce terroriste (My brother the terrorist), 2012

== See also ==
- Chahdortt Djavann
