= Yamaha TMAX =

Series of mega-scooters from Yamaha

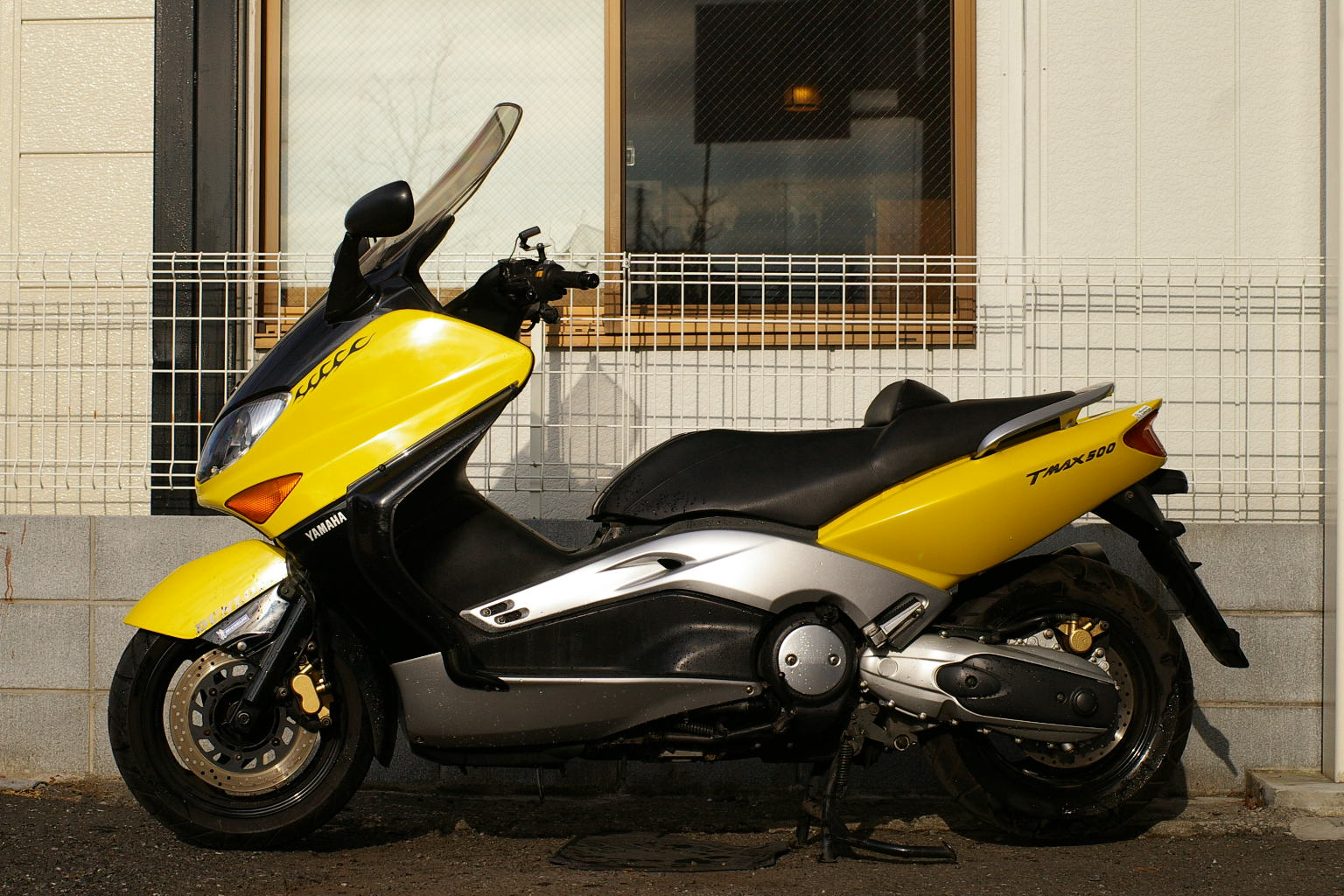
- 1st Generation Yamaha XP500 TMAX
- Manufacturer: Yamaha Motor Company
- Also called: XP500
- Production: 2001–present
- Class: Mega-scooter
- Engine: 499 cm^{3} (30.5 cu in) Liquid-cooled 4-stroke DOHC parallel-twin
- Bore / stroke: 66 mm × 73 mm (2.6 in × 2.9 in)
- Compression ratio: 10.0:1 for model years 2001-2003, 11.0:1 for model years 2004-2011
- Top speed: 100 mph (160 km/h)
- Power: 29.4 kW (39.4 hp) at 7,000 rpm, 32.6 kW (43.7 hp) at 7,500 04-07; 32.0 kW (42.9 hp) at 7,500 08-11
- Torque: 45.8 N⋅m (33.8 lbf⋅ft) at 5,500 rpm, 47.6 N⋅m (35.1 lbf⋅ft) at 6,250 04-07; 45 N⋅m (33 lbf⋅ft) at 6,500 08-11
- Ignition type: TCI
- Transmission: V-Belt Automatic CVT
- Frame type: Tubular steel 2001-2007, Die cast aluminum 2008-2011
- Suspension: Front: Telescopic fork, 120 mm (4.7 in) travel Rear: Swingarm with monoshock, 120 mm (4.7 in) travel 2001-2007, 116 mm (4.6 in) travel 2008-2011
- Brakes: F: Single 282 mm (11.1 in) disc, dual 267 mm (10.5 in) discs 04-11; R: Single 267 mm (10.5 in) disc
- Tires: F: 120/70-14 2001-2003, 120/70R14 2004-2007, 120/70R15 2008-2011; R: 150/70-14 2001-2003, 160/60R15 2004-2011
- Rake, trail: 28° 95 mm (3.7 in) 2001-2007, 25° 92 mm (3.6 in) 2008-2011
- Wheelbase: 1,575 mm (62.0 in) 2001-2007, 1,580 mm (62 in) 2008-2011
- Dimensions: L: 2,235 mm (88.0 in) 2001-2007, 2,195 mm (86.4 in) 2008-2011; W: 775 mm (30.5 in); H: 1,410 mm (56 in) 2001-2007, 1,445 mm (56.9 in) 2008-2011
- Seat height: 795 mm (31.3 in) 2001-2007, 800 mm (31 in) 2008-2011
- Weight: 217 kg (478 lb) 2001-2003, 225–230 kg (496–507 lb) 04-07, 221–225 kg (487–496 lb) 08-11 (wet)
- Fuel capacity: 14 L (3.1 imp gal; 3.7 US gal) 01-07, 15 L (3.3 imp gal; 4.0 US gal) 08-11
- Turning radius: 2.8 m (9 ft 2 in)

Yamaha TMAX 530cc
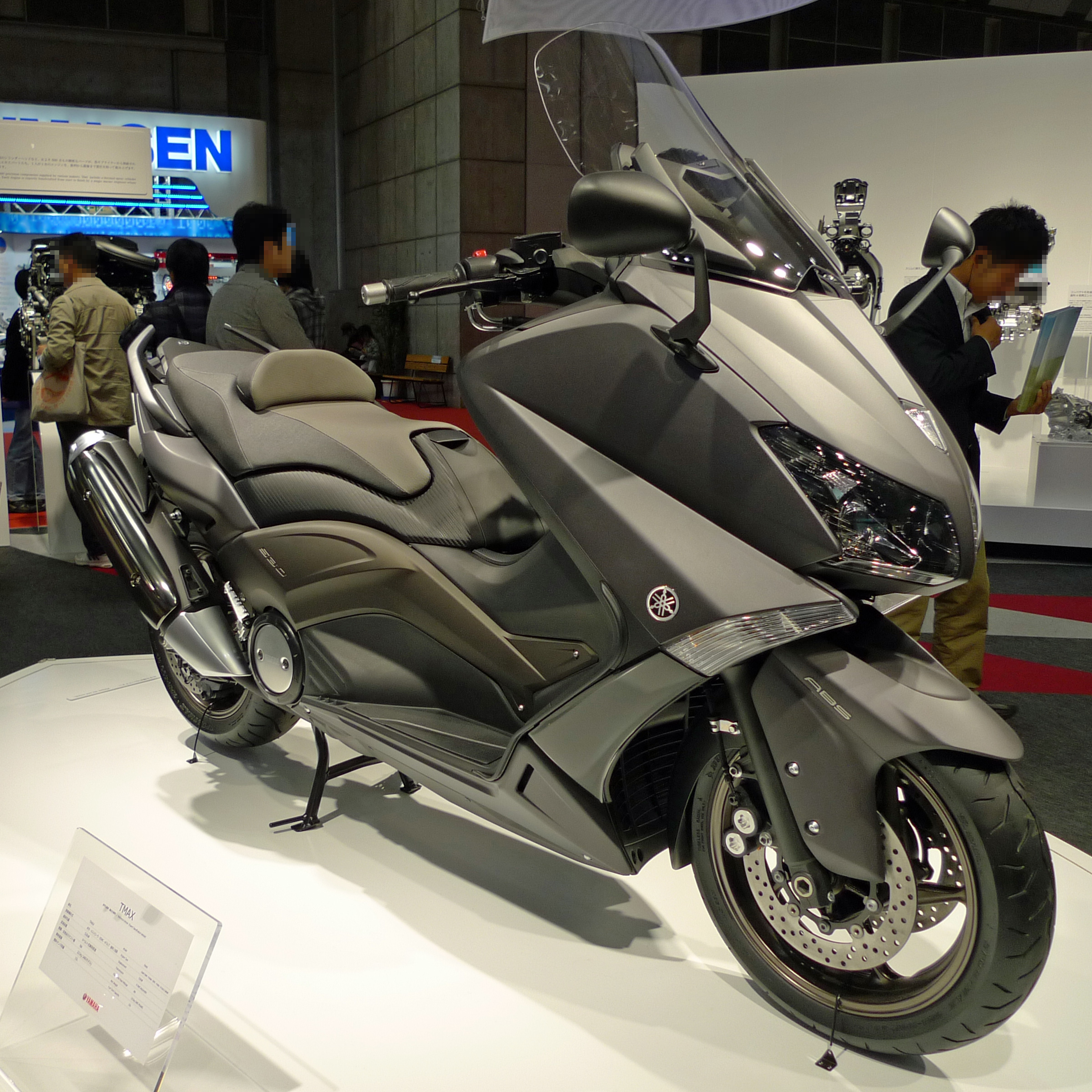
- 4th Generation Yamaha XP530 TMAX
- Manufacturer: Yamaha Motor Company
- Also called: XP530
- Production: 2012—2019
- Class: Mega-scooter
- Engine: 530 cm^{3} (32 cu in) Liquid-cooled 4-stroke DOHC parallel-twin
- Bore / stroke: 68 mm × 73 mm (2.7 in × 2.9 in)
- Compression ratio: 10.9:1
- Power: 34.2 kW (45.9 hp) at 6,750 rpm, 33.8 kW (45.3 hp) at 6,750 2017-
- Torque: 52.3 N⋅m (38.6 lbf⋅ft) at 5,250 rpm, 53.0 N⋅m (39.1 lbf⋅ft) at 5,250 2017-
- Ignition type: TCI
- Transmission: V-Belt Automatic CVT
- Frame type: Extruded and die cast aluminum
- Suspension: Front: Telescopic fork, 120 mm (4.7 in) travel Rear: Swingarm with monoshock, 116 mm (4.6 in) travel 2012-2016, 117 mm (4.6 in) travel 2017—
- Brakes: F: Dual 267 mm (10.5 in) discs R: Single 282 mm (11.1 in) disc
- Tires: F: 120/70R15, R: 160/60R15
- Rake, trail: 25° 92 mm (3.6 in) 2012-2016, 26° 98 mm (3.9 in) 2017—
- Wheelbase: 1,580 mm (62 in)
- Dimensions: L: 2,200 mm (87 in); W: 775 mm (30.5 in) 2012-2016, 765 mm (30.1 in) 2017— H: 1,420–1,475 mm (55.9–58.1 in), 1,420–1,555 mm (55.9–61.2 in) DX
- Seat height: 800 mm (31 in)
- Weight: 217–221 kg (478–487 lb) 2012-14, 219–229 kg (483–505 lb) 2015-16, 213–216 kg (470–476 lb) 2017- (wet)
- Fuel capacity: 15 L (3.3 imp gal; 4.0 US gal)
- Turning radius: 2.8 m (9 ft 2 in)

The Yamaha TMAX (or T-Max) series of mega-scooters has been manufactured by Yamaha Motor Company for the European market since its debut at July 2000 press events in Naples, Italy and Iwata, Japan, combining motorcycle performance with the convenience and flexibility for commuting of a scooter.

When it was introduced, the 500cc TMAX engine was the largest (and most powerful) ever used in a production scooter. Yamaha enlarged the engine to 530cc for 2012 and subsequent models. The most recent TMAX redesign, with the model designation XP530, is for the 2017 model year. This model includes D-Mode which lets the rider select a sportier engine running mode for more thrilling performance. Yamaha used the designation XP500 for all previous model years; more than 233,000 TMAX scooters have been sold in Europe.

Notwithstanding the fact that the TMAX was Yamaha's second mega-scooter, the first being the YP 250 Majesty introduced in 1996, motorcycle journalist Kevin Ash said that the "T-Max is the machine that invented the mega-scooter class in 2001." The development team received a 2001 Good Design Award (Japan) gold prize for the original TMAX, and Yamaha's design studio won a Red Dot award for product design on the 2012 TMAX.

Yamaha launched the TMAX 560 in May 2020 which has replaced the 530. Sales remain strong mainly in France, Italy and Spain despite the high prices and strong competition from Honda with the new NC750X range.

== Design ==
Following the 1996 success of Yamaha's first mega-scooter, the YP 250 Majesty, in Europe (and especially in Italy) Yamaha began work on a "New European Commuter" a larger-displacement scooter-type concept. Their objective was to create a mega-scooter suitable for high-speed motorways, such as the German Autobahn system or the Autostrade of Italy, and better suited to European physiques than the Majesty (designed for the Japanese market).

Marketing strategy for the TMAX targeted three groups of riders: existing scooter riders; owners of middleweight motorcycles; and new or returning riders who would want scooter simplicity combined with automotive luxury. Yamaha estimated there were millions of holders of full motorcycle licenses in Europe no longer riding any kind of two-wheeler.

TMAX rolled-out as a hybrid, combining motorcycle and scooter traits. In order to cope with the power of a larger engine, the TMAX swingarm was the kind found on motorcycle, rather than incorporating the swingarm and engine into a single unit, as on conventional scooters. Yamaha bolted the engine to the frame, but much farther forward, arriving at the weight distribution of a typical motorcycle. Although it was a step-through design, TMAX was built around a motorcycle-type tubular steel frame instead of a U-section pressed steel monocoque frame, as was the case on most scooters.

TMAX designers chose a novel engine configuration: a water-cooled four-stroke horizontal straight-twin (both cylinders pointing forward) with four valves per cylinder operated by dual overhead cams. Engine vibrations were offset not by a balance shaft but by reciprocating balancer (i.e., a third 'dummy' piston driven from a central crankpin). By comparison, transmission design was the norm for scooters: a twist-and-go automatic transmission.

== Model history ==
The 2000 launch of the first generation TMAX in Europe was followed by a second generation 2004 model with performance and handling improvements. The third generation TMAX, a major revision, was introduced in Europe for the 2008 model year. This was the first version to be sold in North America, starting with the 2009 model year.

=== 2001–2003 ===
The initial TMAX was produced for three model years, 2001 to 2003, with no significant changes.

=== 2004–2007 ===
Engine upgrades for the 2004 model year included replacing the twin carburetors with fuel injection, and raising the compression ratio, to boost horsepower and torque. In front, the original 38 mm diameter fork tubes were enlarged to 41 mm, and dual discs replaced the original single disc brake; ABS was available. A parking brake mechanism was added to the rear disk. Radial tires were fitted to both ends, and rear wheel size grew to 15 inch instead of 14 inch. A tachometer was added to the instrument panel. Minor styling changes included new paint colors, including a BLACK MAX special edition for 2006.

=== 2008–2011 ===
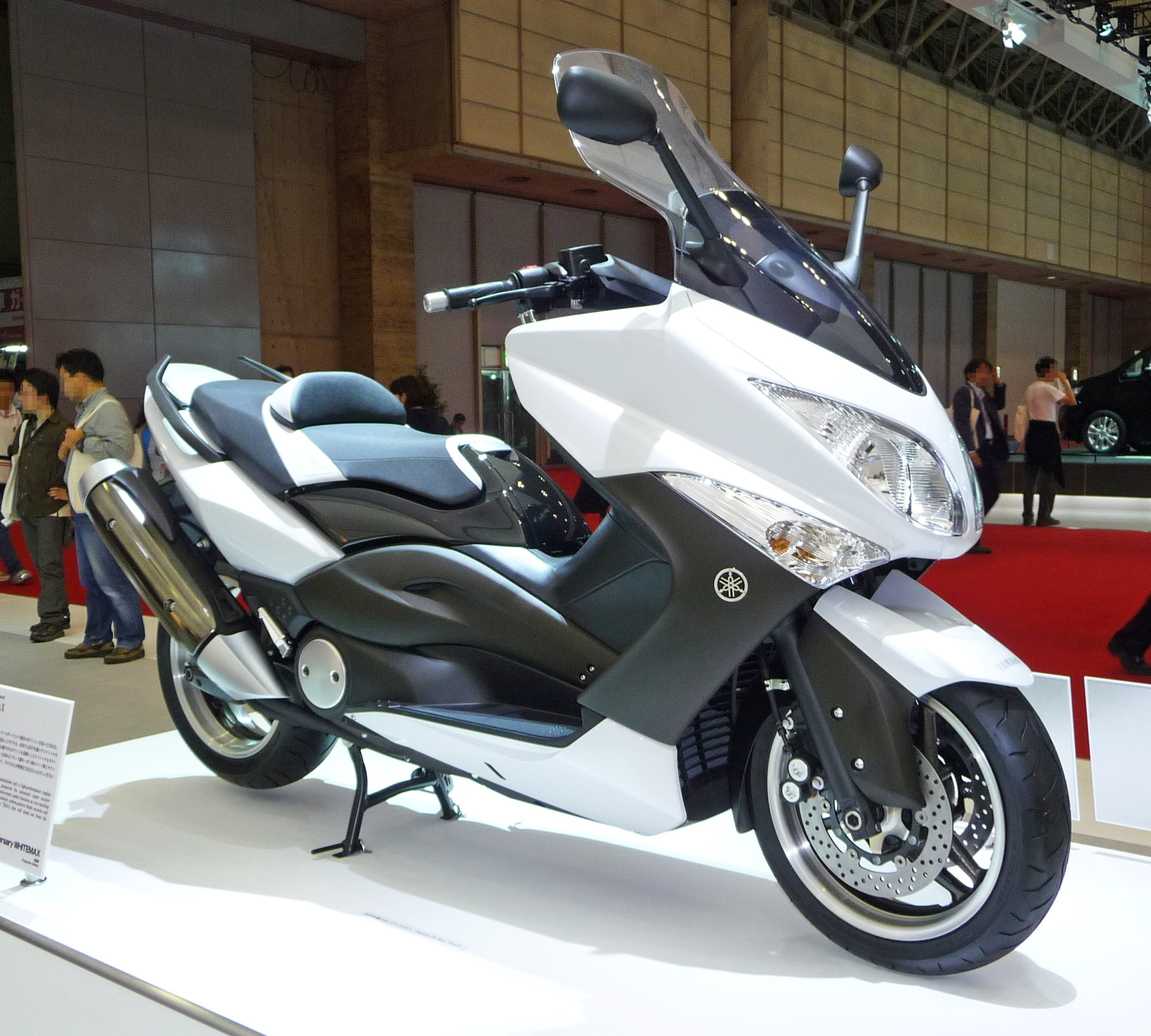
3rd Generation XP500 TMAX, the 2010 WHITE MAX special edition

The 2008 model had new bodywork and a lightweight cast aluminum frame instead of the original tubular steel frame. The 2nd generation 41 mm diameter fork tubes were further enlarged to 43 mm, and front wheel size grew to 15 inch instead of 14 inch. Fuel tank capacity increased from 14 to 15 liters (3.1 to 3.3 imperial gallons; 3.7 to 4.0 U.S. gallons).

To mark the tenth anniversary of the TMAX roll-out, Yamaha produced a WHITE MAX special edition for 2010.

=== 2012–2014 ===
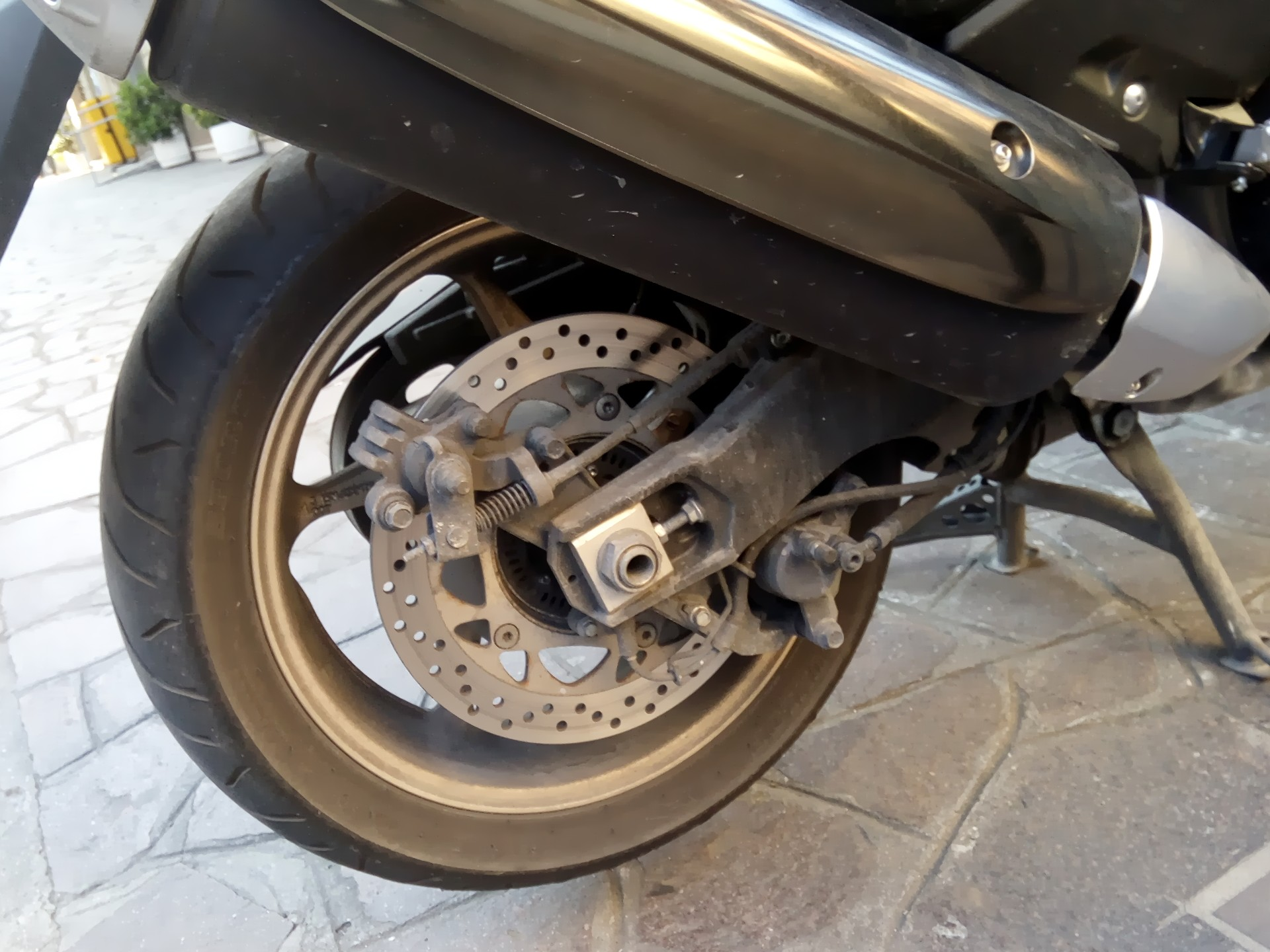
4th Generation TMAX rear wheel, showing hydraulic brake caliper and parking brake mechanism on disc

The fourth generation TMAX had a redesigned body and powertrain. Cylinders were bored-out by 2 mm, increasing displacement to 530cc. Other engine modifications included a newly designed pent-roof combustion chamber and a reworking of the fuel injection. The continuously variable transmission and final drive system were redesigned; the previous chain drive enclosed in an oil-bath (attached to one side of the swingarm) was replaced by a belt drive with a separate die-cast aluminum swingarm.

=== 2015–2016 ===
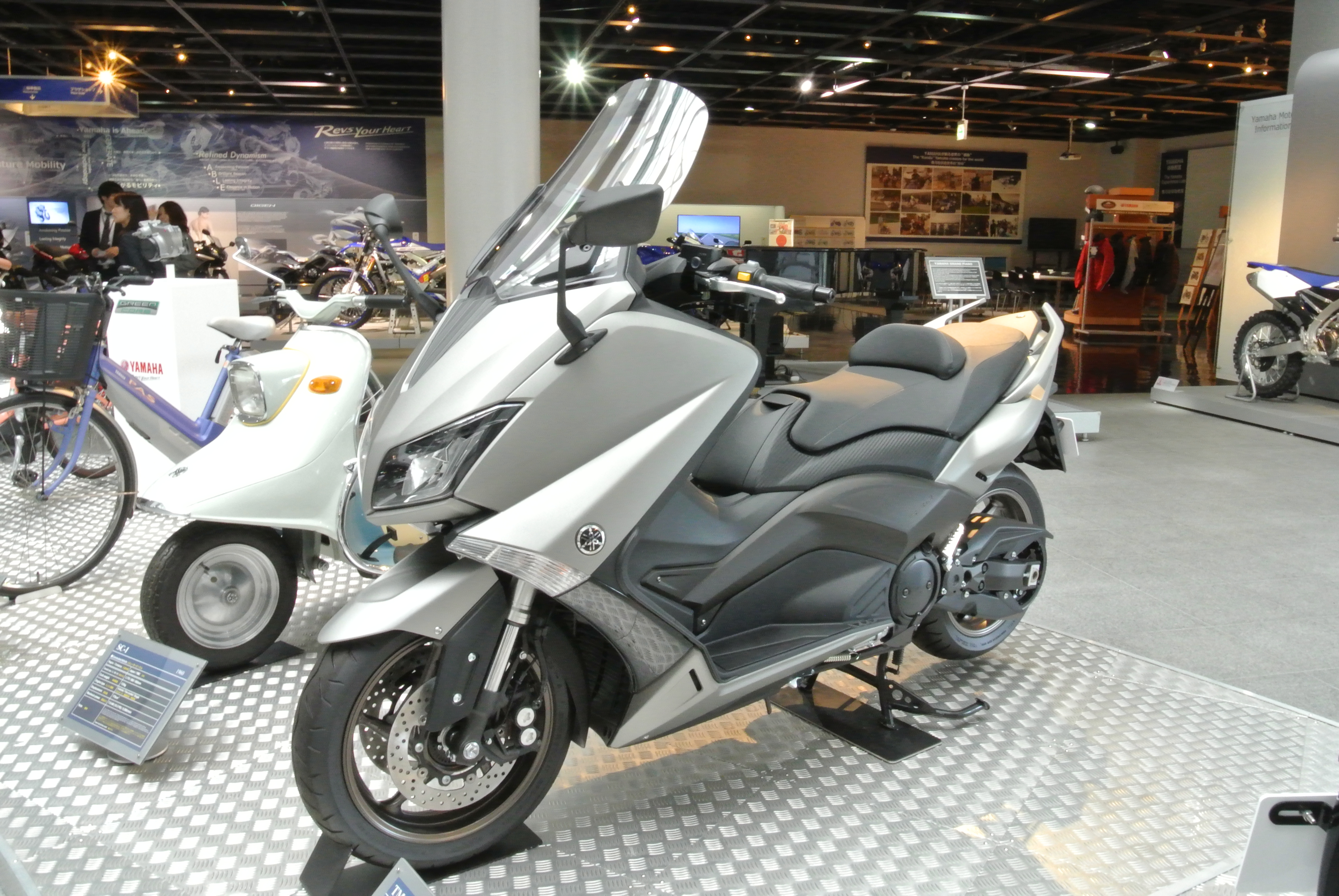
2015–2016 TMAX 530

Front suspension was revamped on the fifth generation TMAX with an upside down (inverted) telescopic fork with radial-mounted brake calipers. Bodywork received modest styling updates. Yamaha also produced an IRON MAX special edition.

=== 2017 to 2022 ===
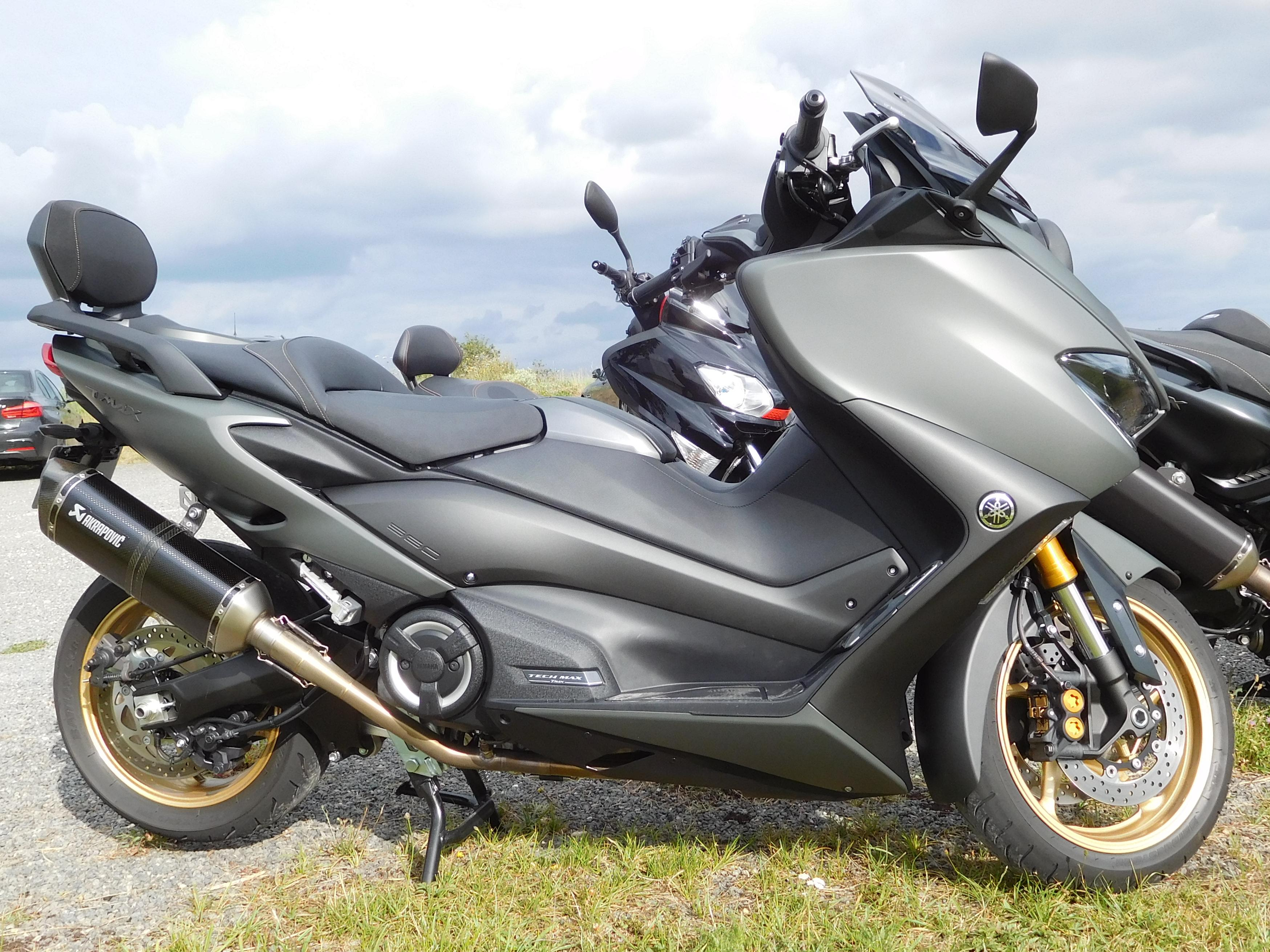
2020–2022 TMAX 560

Chassis and bodywork updated. TMAX 530 was offered in 3 versions: standard, SX and DX. All versions have an electronically controlled throttle and a traction control system. SX and DX versions have switchable power modes; the DX version also has cruise control and an electrically adjustable windscreen as well as keyless ignition (the electronic key must be near to the bike). In early 2020 the 530 was discontinued and the 560 launched in its place. The 560 was an updated version of the 530 and complied to the latest emissions regulations. In 2022, Yamaha launched a new version of the 560 called the TMAX Tech MAX, with a new all colour dashboard and a full set of electronics, including ABS, Traction Control, Cruise Control etc.

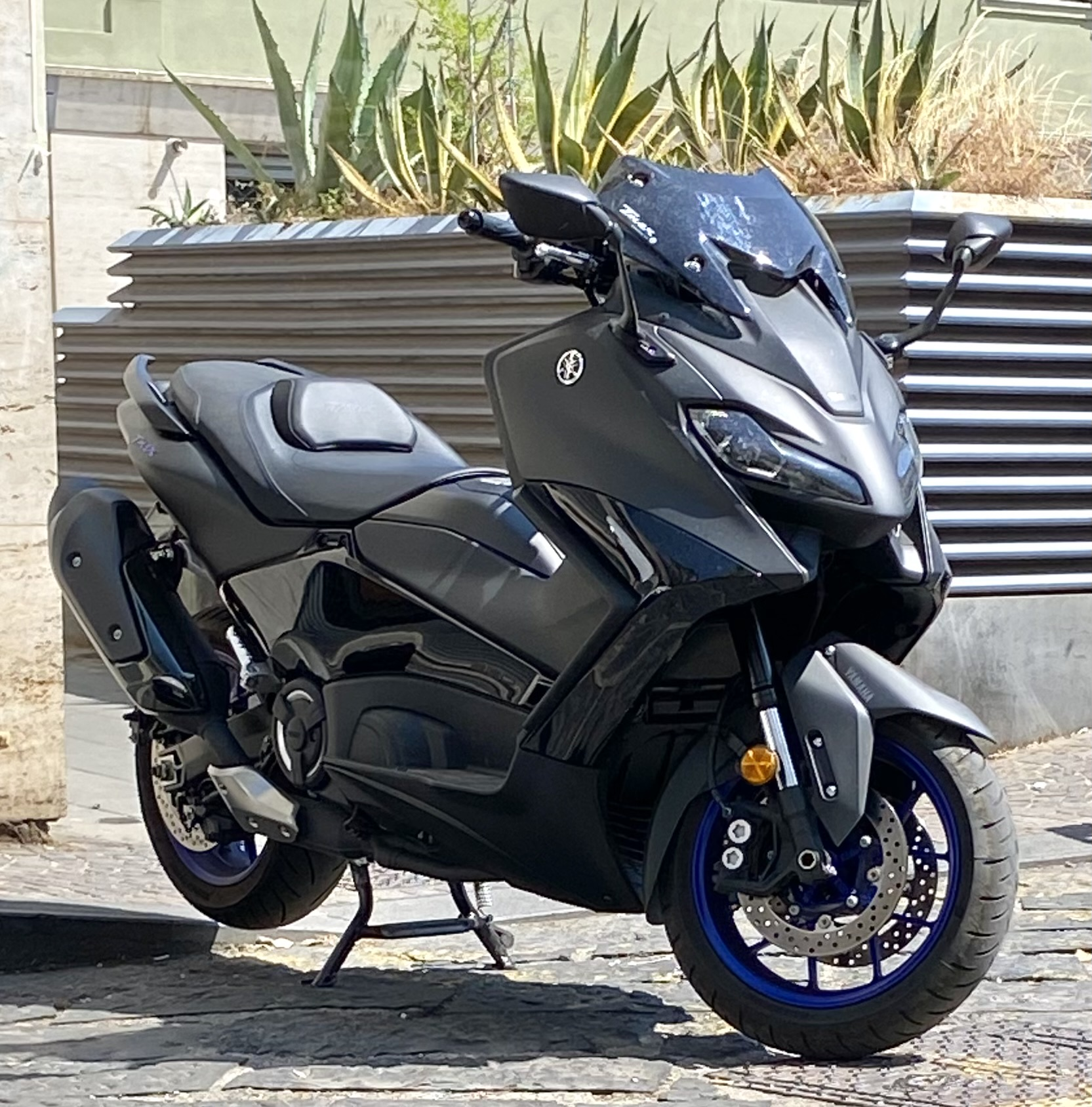
2023–2025 TMAX 560

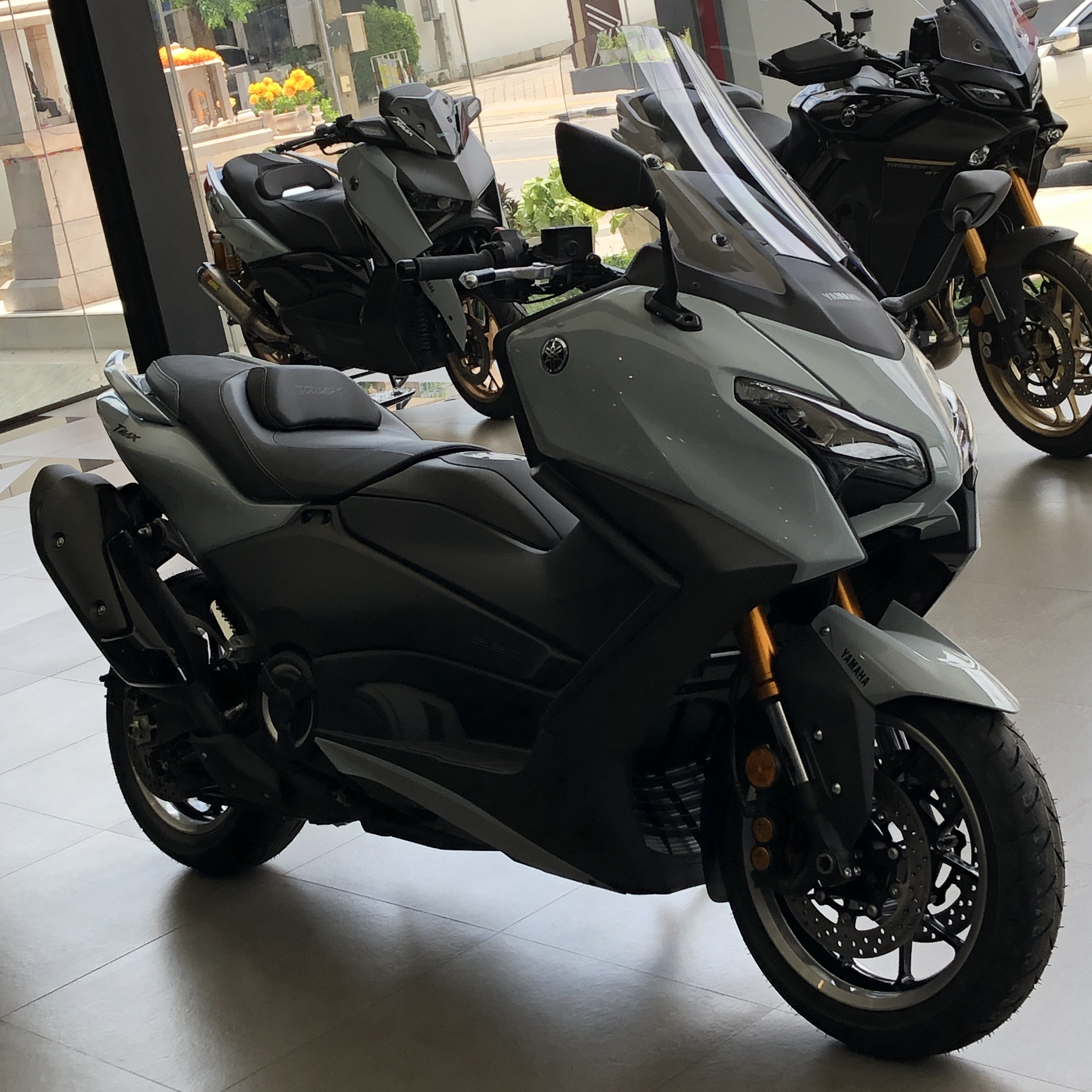
2025 TMAX 560 Tech MAX
