= Vigipirate =

French national security alert system

Vigipirate logo of the ongoing Opération Sentinelle

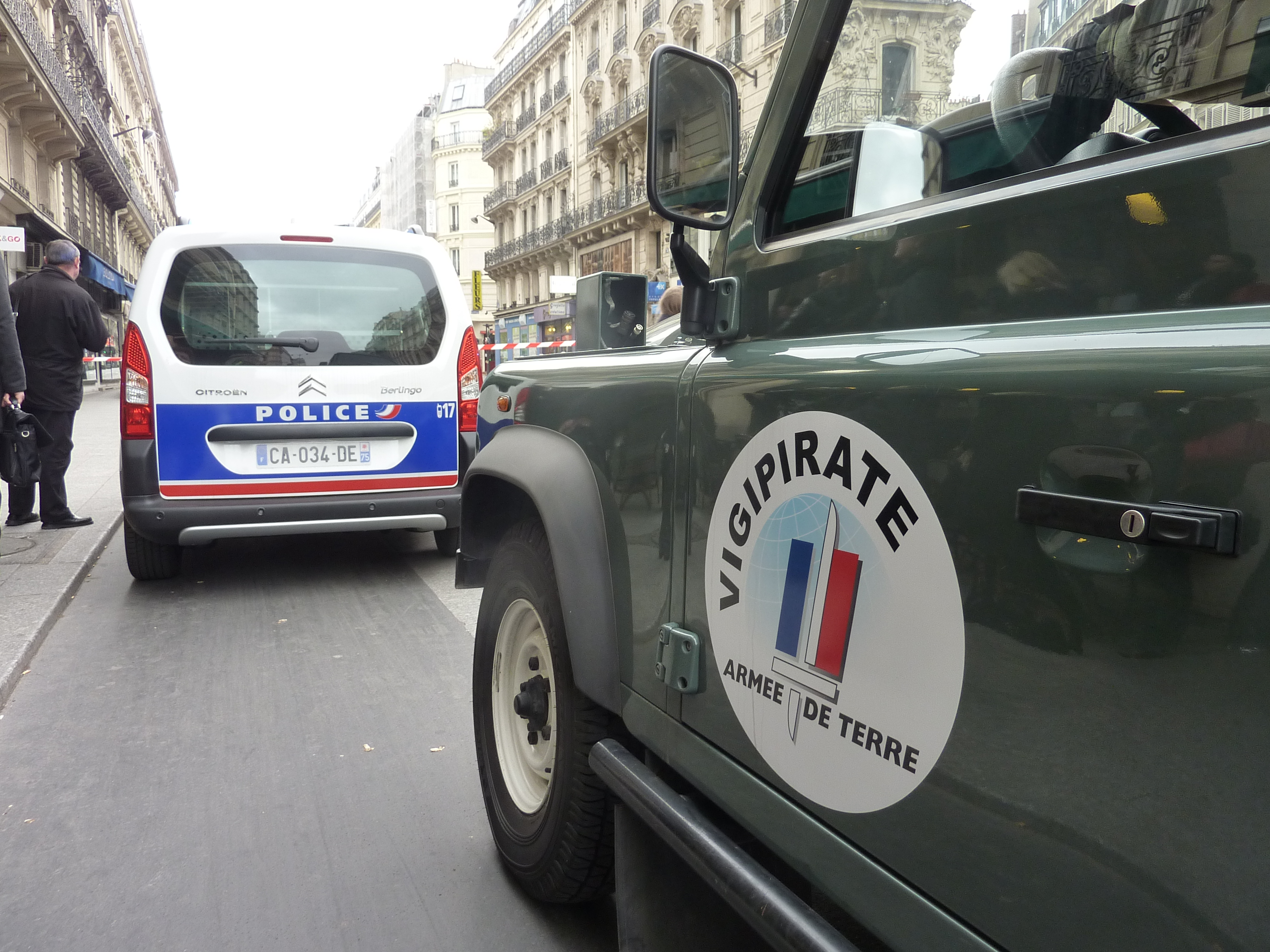
French Army Land Rover Defender Vigipirate door marking.

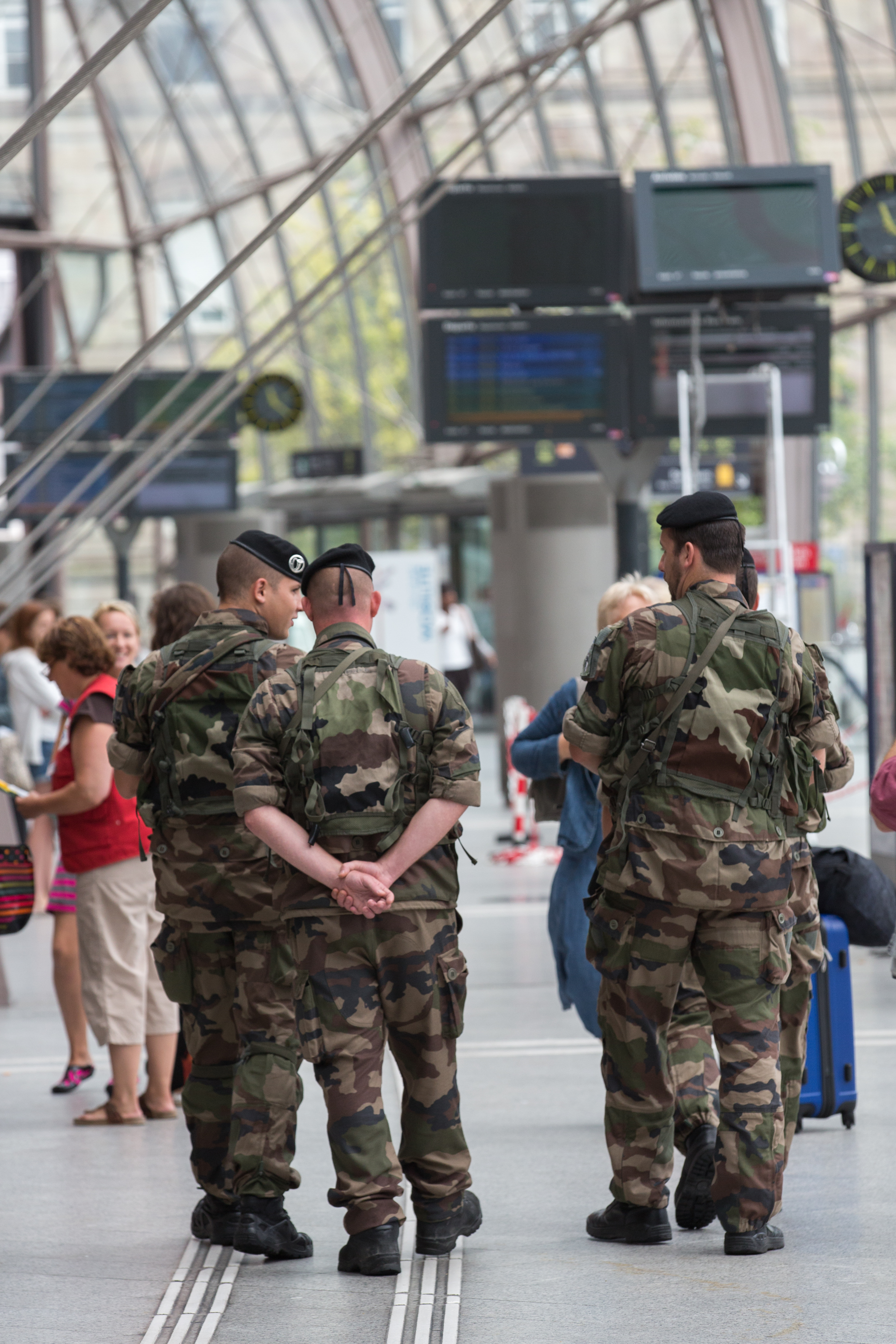
Soldiers of the French Army on patrol at Strasbourg station 19 August, 2013.

Vigipirate (French: Plan Vigipirate [vi.ʒi.pi.ʁat]) is France's national security alert system. Created in 1978 through interministerial sessions and falling within the responsibilities of the prime minister, it has since been updated three times: in 1995 (following a terror bombing campaign), 2000 and 2004.

== Details ==
Until 2014 the system defined four levels of threats represented by five colors: white, yellow, orange, red, scarlet. The levels called for specific security measures, including increased police or police/military mixed patrols in subways, train stations and other vulnerable locations.

In February 2014 the levels were simplified to 'vigilance' (or surveillance) and 'attack alert'. In December 2016, they were reorganized in three levels: 'vigilance', 'heightened security/risk of attack' and 'attack emergency'.

The name "Vigipirate" is an acronym of vigilance et protection des installations contre les risques d'attentats terroristes à l'explosif (lit. 'surveillance and protection of facilities against the risk of terrorist bombing attacks').

== Levels of alert (to 2014) ==
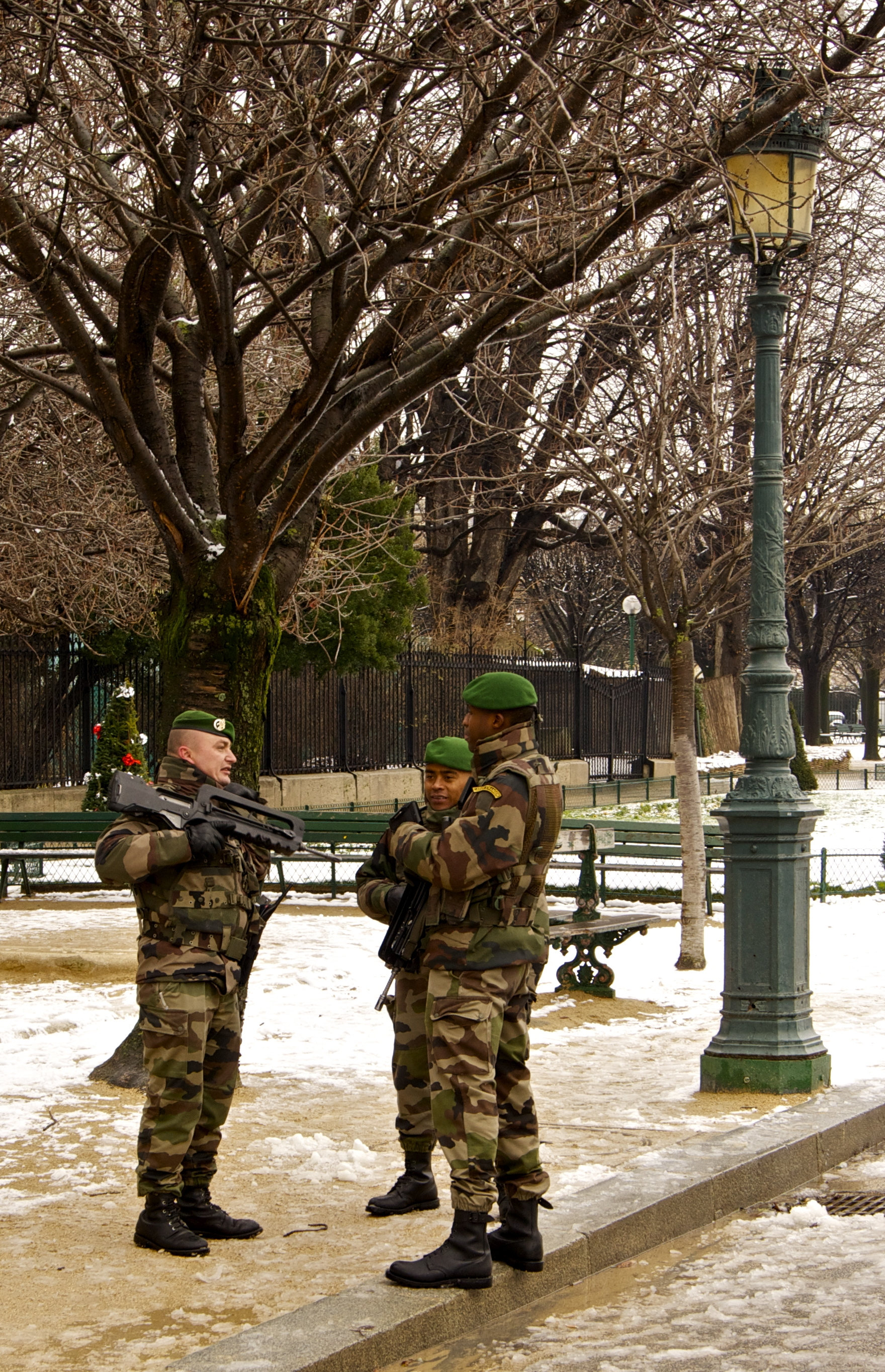
French Foreign Legionnaires near Notre Dame de Paris 20 November 2010

Alert level	Color	Significance	Measures taken
0	White	No danger	No danger
1	Yellow	Vague threat / raise vigilance	Raise security levels to face real yet still uncertain dangers, through measures that are local and minimally disruptive of normal activity, while preparing to switch to "orange" or "red" within a few days.
2	Orange	Possible threat / prevent terrorist action	Take measures against plausible risks of terrorist action, including the use of means that are moderately disruptive to normal public activities, while preparing to switch to "red" or "scarlet" on short notice where possible.
3	Red	High chance of threat / prevent serious attack	Take measures against a proven risk of one or more terrorist actions, including measures to protect public institutions and putting in place appropriate means for rescue and response, authorizing a significant level of disruption to social and economic activity.
4	Scarlet	Definite threat / prevent major attack	Notification of a risk of major attacks, simultaneous or otherwise, using non-conventional means and causing major devastation; preparing appropriate means of rescue and response, measures that are highly disruptive to public life are authorized.

== Levels of alert (2014-2016) ==
Vigilance

Attack Alert

== Levels of alert (from 2016) ==
Vigilance

Heightened Security / Risk of Attack

Attack Emergency

== History of alert levels ==
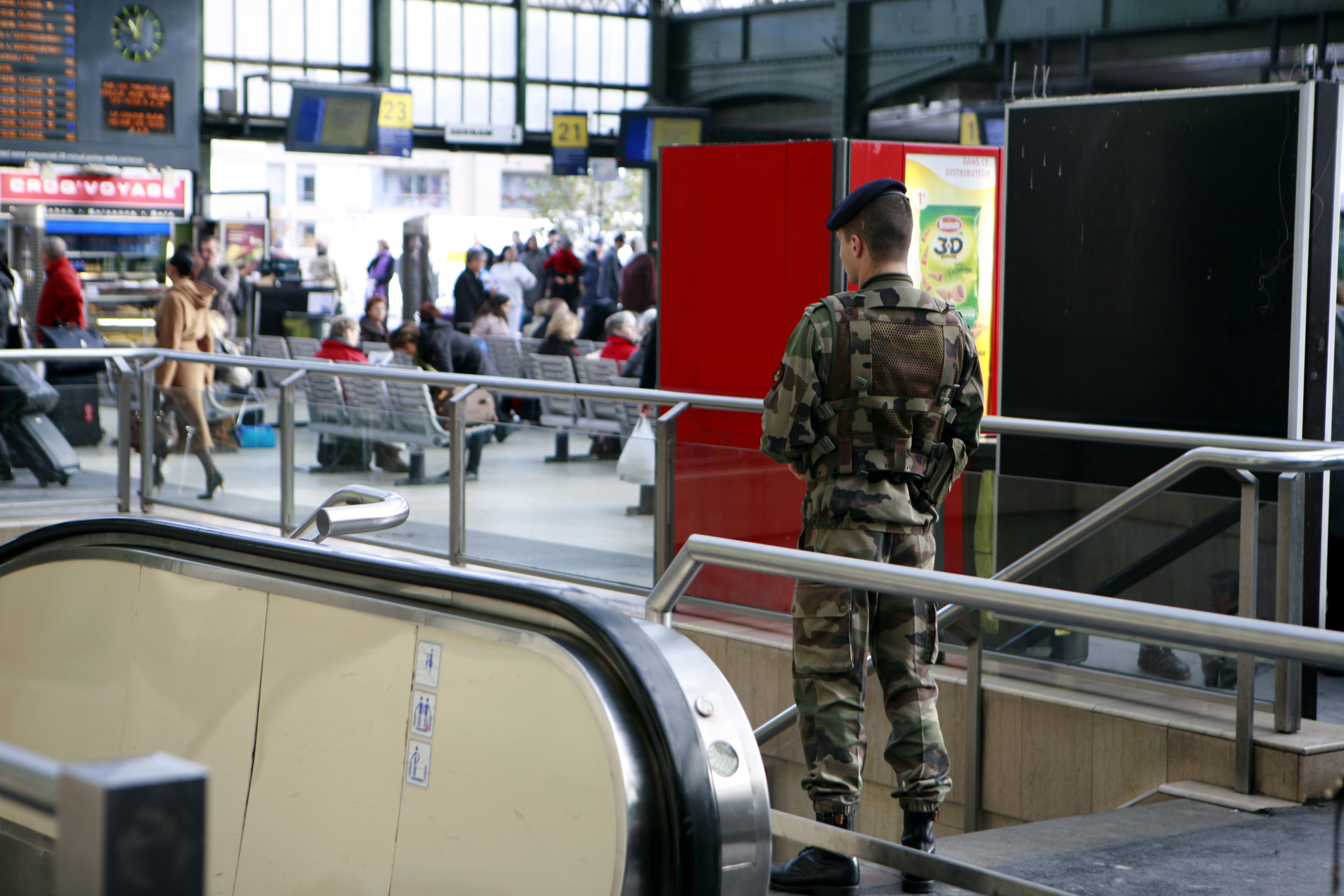
French Marine on Vigipirate duty at Gare de Lyon

Date	Level	Description
2 January 1991	Phase 1	First release phase 1 in the beginning of the Gulf War.
17 January 1991	Phase 2	Passage of phase 2 in the early war strikes.
26 April 1991	Lifting of level	
8 September 1995	Release	After the 1995 Paris Métro and RER bombings.
15 January 1996	Relief	
October 1996	Suspension	
3 December 1996	Reactivation	After an attack on the RER station Port Royal in Paris.
1998	Reinforcement	Due to the 1998 FIFA World Cup (see World Cup terror plot).
24 April 1999	Reinforcement	Due to the Kosovo War.
24 April 1999	Reactivation	In the wake of the attacks in Corsica.
27 December 1999	Reactivation	In the wake of the Y2K problem.
11 September 2001	Reinforcement	After the September 11 attacks in the United States.
5 June 2002	Extension	Extended by the new Prime Minister Jean-Pierre Raffarin.
9 September 2002	Extension	Extension of Vigipirate strengthened after the 11 September attacks.
6 December 2002	Reinforcement	Celebrations at the end of the year.
20 March 2003	Reinforcement	At the beginning of the Iraq War.
20 March 2003	Orange level	Reforming of Vigipirate and the introduction of color levels due to the Iraq war.
17 May 2003	Orange level	After the 2003 Casablanca bombings.
2 October 2003	Yellow level	Prime Ministerial decision.
1 December 2003	Orange level	Due to the celebrations.
26 January 2004	Yellow level	
12 March 2004	Red level	Only in land transport; orange everywhere else. After the 2004 Madrid train bombings.
24 May 2004	Red level	During the week-long anniversary of the invasion of Normandy.
8 June 2004	Orange level	
8 July 2004	Orange level	
7 July 2005	Red level	After the 7 July 2005 London bombings.
10 October 2005	Red level	New measures adopted.
8 November 2005	State of emergency	State of emergency implemented due to the 2005 French riots.
4 January 2006	Red level	End of the state of emergency.
July 2006	Red level	New measures adopted.
16 December 2008	Red level	After explosives are found at a Paris department store.
August 2010	Red level	Measures of protection are reinforced.
September 2010	Red level	Strengthening of security throughout the country.
November 2010	Red level	After five terror suspects are arrested.
May 2011	Red level	After the death of Osama bin Laden.
19 March 2012	Scarlet level	After the Toulouse and Montauban shootings. First time scarlet level is implemented.
24 March 2012	Red level	Level lowered back to red after the Toulouse and Montauban shootings suspect was apprehended.
20 February 2014	Vigilance	Level set to "Vigilance" with the inauguration of the updated Vigipirate threat levels.
7 January 2015	Attack alert	Alert level raised in Île-de-France, and in the Picardy region the following day, after the Charlie Hebdo shooting. The alert level was lowered back to Vigilance in Picardy on 14 January 2015, while being maintained at the Attack level in Île de France.
14 November 2015	State of emergency	A state of emergency was declared throughout the whole of France, the day following the November 2015 Paris attacks; this state of emergency was continually extended until 1 November 2017.
29 October 2020	Attack emergency	After the 2020 Nice stabbing. 3 were killed in Notre-Dame de Nice.
5 March 2021	Heightened Security/Risk of attack	
13 October 2023	Attack emergency	After the 2023 multiple attacks from same day, in a highschool in Arras (62) and 2 other attacks foiled.
24 March 2024	Attack emergency	In response to the Crocus City Hall attack in Moscow.

== See also ==
- States of emergency in France
- Opération Sentinelle
- UK Threat Levels, used in the United Kingdom from 2006
  - BIKINI state, previously used in the United Kingdom
- Homeland Security Advisory System (United States)
