= Dan Bilefsky =

Canadian newspaper journalist

Dan Bilefsky is a Canadian journalist and author who spent nearly two-decades as an international correspondent for The New York Times. In 2018, after 28 years abroad, based in London, Paris, Brussels, Istanbul, Prague, and New York, Bilefsky returned to his hometown of Montreal. Over the course of his career, Bilefsky has reported from more than 20 countries on geopolitical, economic, social and cultural stories, including Russia's invasion of Ukraine, Israel's incursion in Gaza, the Greek financial crisis, and Celine Dion's cultural meaning. He was also part of the Times's team that investigated the assassination of Haiti's President, a series that won a Polk Award and was a finalist for the Pulitzer Prize.

Journalist and author Dan Bilefsky

Before joining The Times, Bilefsky worked as a staff writer for The Wall Street Journal and The Financial Times, and served as a research fellow at the London-based Center for European Reform.

During his time with The New York Times, Bilefsky served as a correspondent in London and Paris, covering major global stories such as Brexit, the European refugee crisis, the 2015 terrorist attacks at the Bataclan nightclub in Paris, and the trial of former IMF chief Dominique Strauss-Kahn. He also worked as culture reporter based in New York, writing on the arts, film, television, and classical music.

One of his most widely read stories was his investigation of the Hatton Garden heist, a 2015 burglary carried out by a crew of elderly British thieves, who stole an estimated $20 million in jewels, gold and cash. Dubbed "the Bad Grandpas," the gang executed what became the largest burglary in England's history. Bilefsky chronicled the heist in his book "The Last Job" (W.W. Norton 2020), which was optioned for a television series. The New York Times Book Review called it a “meticulously researched procedural,” and novelist Louise Penny described it as "a fabulous read, gripping, at times hilarious, at times, terrifying.”

== Biography ==
As a foreign correspondent, Bilefsky has written on a broad range of human interest stories and international issues. In Turkey, he examined the phenomenon of honor killings; in Portugal, he covered the culture of bullfighting. In the Balkans, he investigated the whereabouts of the Bosnian-Serb war crimes fugitive Ratko Mladic, who was arrested after 15 years on the run.

In New York, he reported on a bizarre criminal case involving a man who raped his girlfriend and then framed her for a series of fictional armed robberies—described by prosecutors as one of the most elaborate frame-ups in the city's history. In 2008, he travelled to northern Albania to report on the vanishing tradition of "sworn virgins," women who live as men in deeply patriarchal mountain communities.

In addition to his journalism, Bilefsky is editor of “The Financial Times’s Guide to the Euro,” and has lectured at institutions, including McGill University, NYU in Prague, Sciences Po in Paris, London’s City University and Canada's ministry of foreign affairs. He holds a BA in history from The University of Pennsylvania and an MPhil in European politics from Oxford University.
