= UK Threat Levels =

Alert states used by the British Government

- United Kingdom Terror Threat Levels
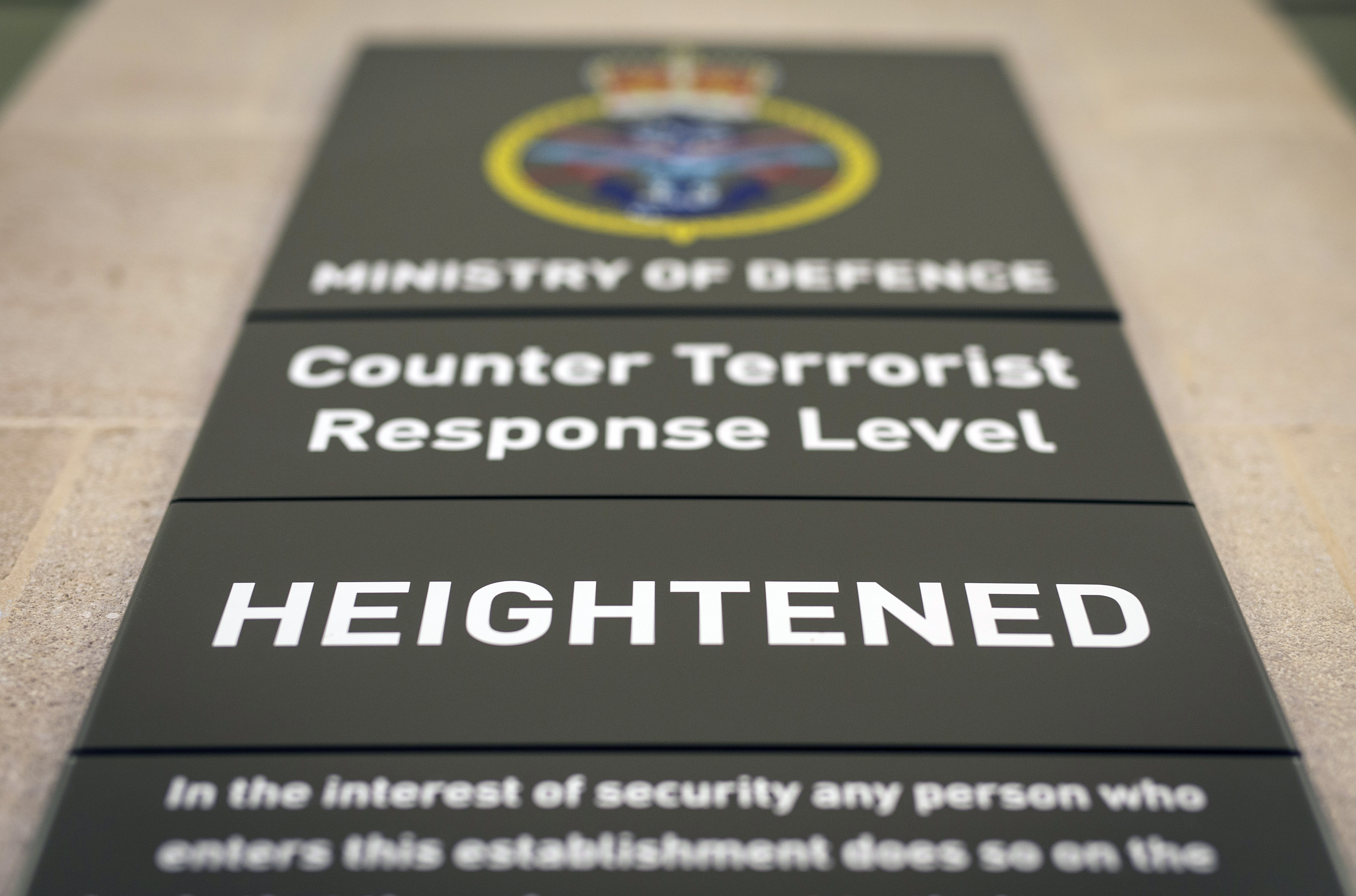
- Sign at the Ministry of Defence Main Building declaring a "HEIGHTENED" counter-terrorist response level

General information
- Current level (National): SEVERE
- Current level (Northern Ireland): SUBSTANTIAL

The United Kingdom Terror Threat Levels, often referred to as UK Threat Levels, are the alert states that have been in use since 1 August 2006 by the British government to warn of forms of terrorist activity. In September 2010, the threat levels for Northern Ireland-related terrorism were also made available. In July 2019, changes were made to the terrorism threat level system, to reflect the threat posed by all forms of terrorism, irrespective of ideology. There is now a single national threat level describing the threat to the UK, which includes Islamist, Northern Ireland, left-wing and right-wing terrorism. Before 2006, a colour-based alert scheme known as BIKINI state was used. The response indicates how government departments and agencies and their staffs should react to each threat level.

== Categories of threat ==
Since 23 July 2019, the Home Office has reported two different categories of terrorist threat:

- National Threat Level.
- Northern Ireland-related Threat Level to Northern Ireland

Previously, since 24 September 2010, the Home Office has reported three different categories of terrorist threat:

- Threat from international terrorism.
- Terrorism threat related to Northern Ireland in Northern Ireland itself.
- Terrorism threat related to Northern Ireland in Great Britain (i.e. excluding Northern Ireland).

A fourth category of terrorist threat is also assessed but is not disclosed, relating to threats to sectors of the UK's critical national infrastructure such as the London Underground, National Rail network and power stations.

The Joint Terrorism Analysis Centre (JTAC) is responsible for setting the threat level from international terrorism and the Security Service (MI5) is responsible for setting both threat levels related to Northern Ireland. The threat level informs decisions on protective security measures taken by public bodies, the police and the transport sector.

== Threat levels ==
Threat level		Response	
Critical	An attack is highly likely in the near future.	Exceptional	Maximum protective security. Critical measures to meet specific threats and to minimise vulnerability and risk.
Severe	An attack is highly likely.	Heightened	Additional and sustainable substantial and severe protective security measures reflecting the broad nature of the threat combined with specific business and geographical vulnerabilities and judgements on acceptable risk.
Substantial	An attack is likely.	Heightened	Additional and sustainable substantial and severe protective security measures reflecting the broad nature of the threat combined with specific business and geographical vulnerabilities and judgements on acceptable risk.
Moderate	An attack is possible, but not likely.	Normal	Routine protective security. Low and moderate measures appropriate to the business concerned.
Low	An attack is highly unlikely.	Normal	Routine protective security. Low and moderate measures appropriate to the business concerned.

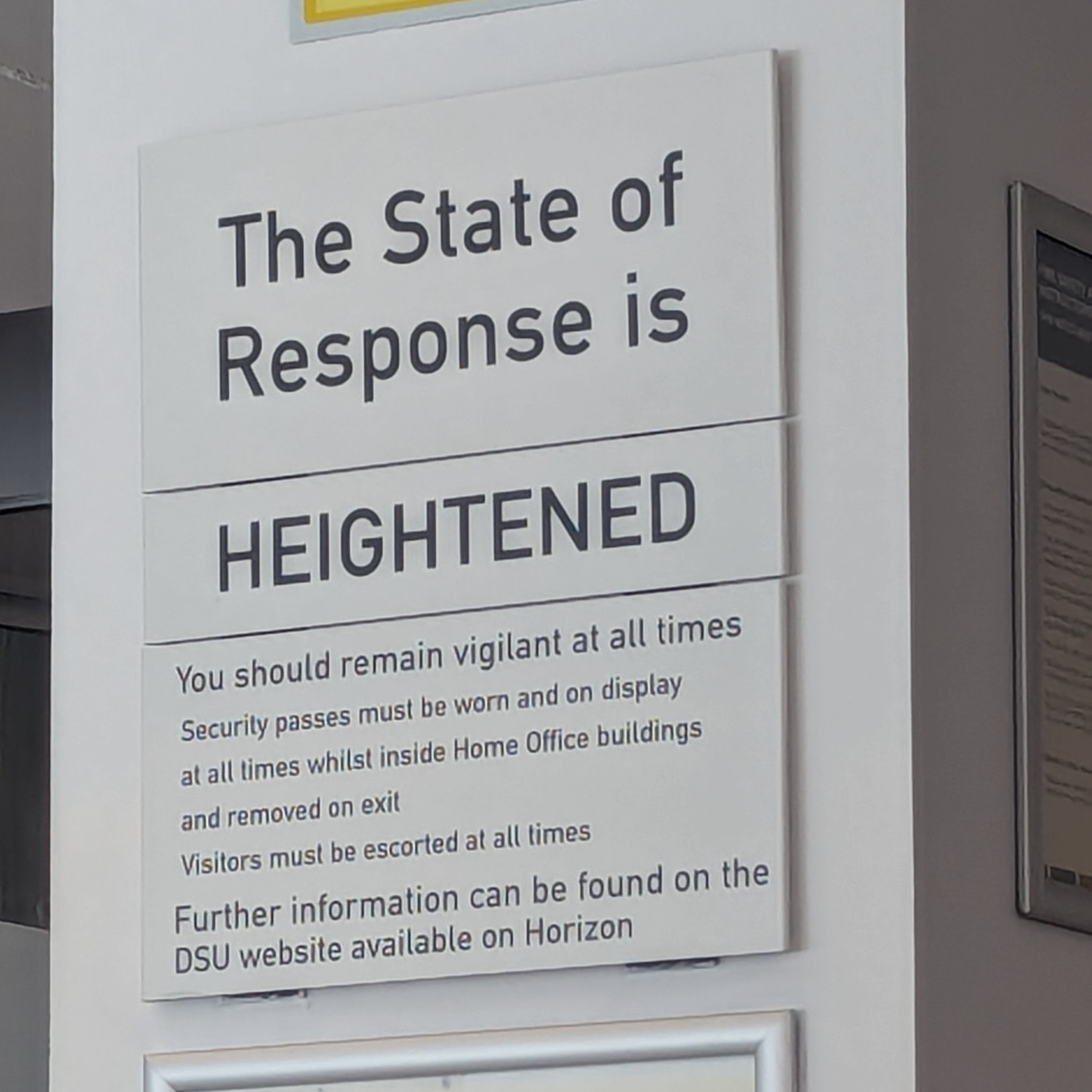
The UK's State of Response listed as "HEIGHTENED" at 2 Marsham Street, the headquarters of the Home Office, in July 2024

Threat Levels are decided using the following information:

- Available intelligence. It is rare that specific threat information is available and can be relied upon. More often, judgements about the threat will be based on a wide range of information, which is often fragmentary, including the level and nature of current terrorist activity, comparison with events in other countries and previous attacks. Intelligence is only ever likely to reveal part of the picture.
- Terrorist capability. An examination of what is known about the capabilities of the terrorists in question and the method they may use based on previous attacks or from intelligence. This would also analyse the potential scale of the attack.
- Terrorist intentions. Using intelligence and publicly available information to examine the overall aims of the terrorists and the ways they may achieve them including what sort of targets they would consider attacking.
- Timescale. The threat level expresses the likelihood of an attack in the near term. We know from past incidents that some attacks take years to plan, while others are put together more quickly. In the absence of specific intelligence, a judgement will need to be made about how close an attack might be to fruition. Threat levels do not have any set expiry date, but are regularly subject to review in order to ensure that they remain current.

== History ==
Threat levels were originally produced by MI5's Counter-Terrorism Analysis Centre for internal use within the British government. Assessments known as Security Service Threat Reports or Security Service Reports were issued to assess the level of threat to British interests in a given country or region. They had six levels: Imminent, High, Significant, Moderate, Low and Negligible. Following terrorist attacks in Indonesia in 2002, the system was criticised by the Intelligence and Security Committee of Parliament (ISC) as insufficiently clear and needing to be of greater use to "customer departments".

The 7 July 2005 London bombings prompted the government to update the threat level system following a recommendation from the ISC that it should deliver "a greater transparency of the threat level and alert systems as a whole, and in particular [it is recommended] that more thought is given to what is put in the public domain about the level of threat and required level of alert." The system was accordingly simplified and made easier to understand. Since 2006, MI5 and the Home Office have published international terrorism threat levels for the entire UK on their websites, and since 2010 they have also published threat levels for Northern Ireland, with separate threat levels for Northern Ireland and the rest of the UK.

=== 2019 'New Reporting Format' ===
In July 2019, changes were made to the terrorism threat level system creating a 'New Format' of threat levels, to reflect the threat posed by all forms of terrorism, irrespective of ideology or motivation.

== Changes to threat levels ==
The following table records changes to the threat levels from July 2019 – Present:

Date	National Threat Level	Northern Ireland-related Threat Level to Northern Ireland
23 July 2019	Severe	Severe
4 November 2019	Substantial	Severe
3 November 2020	Severe (Note: Threat level increased following the 2020 Vienna attack.)	Severe
4 February 2021	Substantial	Severe
15 November 2021	Severe (Note: Threat level increased following the Liverpool Women's Hospital bombing.)	Severe
9 February 2022	Substantial	Severe
22 March 2022	Substantial	Substantial
28 March 2023	Substantial	Severe (Note: Threat level increased following the shooting of John Caldwell.)
6 March 2024	Substantial	Substantial
30 April 2026	Severe (Note: Threat level increased following the 2026 Golders Green attack.)	Substantial

=== Old-format historical threat levels ===
Since 2006, information about the national threat level has been available on the MI5 and Home Office websites. In September 2010 the threat levels for Northern Ireland-related terrorism were also made available. The following table records changes to the threat levels from August 2006 – July 2019 before the 'New Format' was put into place:

Date	National Threat Level of International Terrorism	Threat from Northern Ireland-related terrorism	
Date	National Threat Level of International Terrorism	in Northern Ireland	in Great Britain
1 August 2006	Severe	Not Reported	
10 August 2006	Critical (Note: Threat level increased following the 2006 transatlantic aircraft plot.)	Not Reported	
13 August 2006	Severe	Not Reported	
30 June 2007	Critical (Note: Threat level increased following the 2007 Glasgow Airport attack.)	Not Reported	
4 July 2007	Severe	Not Reported	
20 July 2009	Substantial	Not Reported	
22 January 2010	Severe	Not Reported	
24 September 2010	Severe	Severe	Substantial
11 July 2011	Substantial	Severe	Substantial
24 October 2012	Substantial	Severe	Moderate
29 August 2014	Severe	Severe	Moderate
11 May 2016	Severe	Severe	Substantial
23 May 2017	Critical (Note: Threat level increased following the Manchester Arena bombing.)	Severe	Substantial
27 May 2017	Severe	Severe	Substantial
15 September 2017	Critical (Note: Threat level increased following the Parsons Green bombing.)	Severe	Substantial
17 September 2017	Severe	Severe	Substantial
1 March 2018	Severe	Severe	Moderate

== See also ==
- UK Emergency Alert System
- DEFCON
- Combat readiness
- EMERGCON
- FPCON
- INFOCON
- LERTCON
- REDCON
- Situation awareness
- Torino scale
- COGCON
- Operation Temperer
- Terrorism in the United Kingdom
- National Terrorism Advisory System, a similar scale for terrorism threat used in the United States

Historic/Defunct:

- HANDEL
- BIKINI state
- CONELRAD
- National Emergency Alarm Repeater
- Homeland Security Advisory System
- United States color-coded war plans
- Four-minute warning
- Preparing for Emergencies
