= Ready 5 =

Naval aviation term

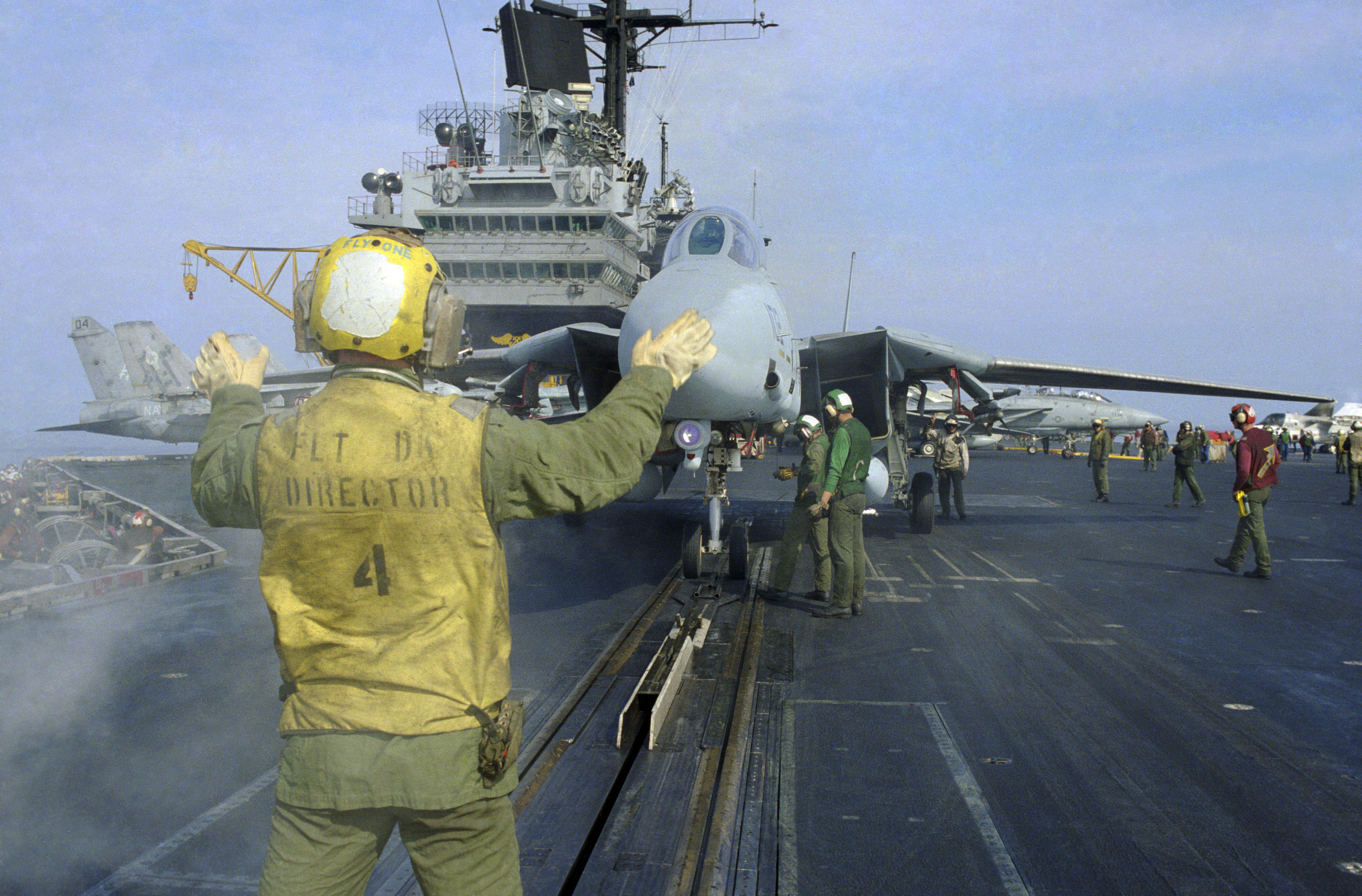

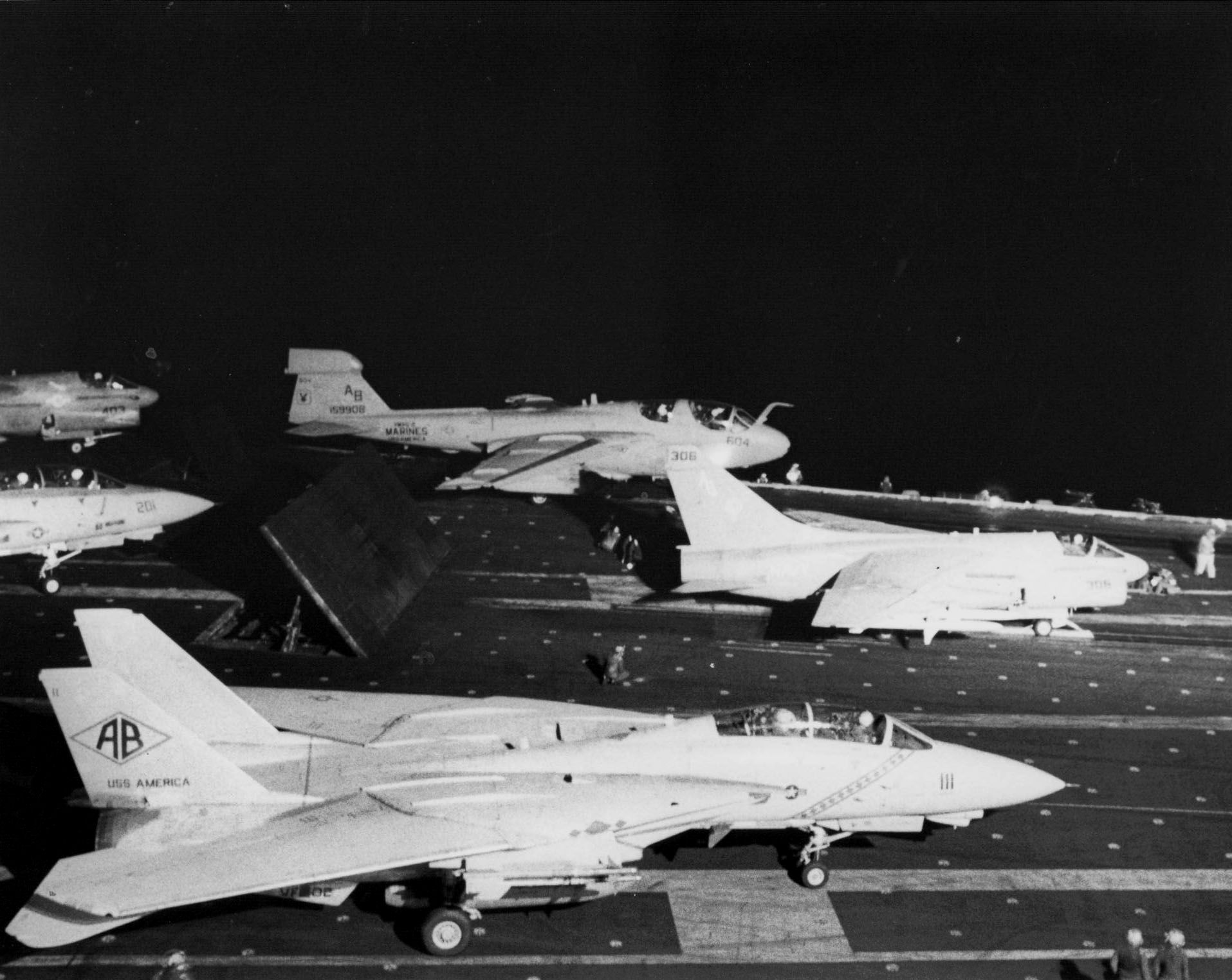

Ready Five, also referred to as Alert Five, is a condition of high alert for aircraft crews on the flight deck of an aircraft carrier, in which they are ready to launch within five minutes. Fighter aircraft are placed on the steam catapult complete with flight crew, armament, and fuel, ready to defend the carrier battle group from any unforeseen threat.

Flight crews sometimes dread being assigned Ready Five, as they can be ordered to remain there for hours on end, in addition to the high probability of being sent into combat on short notice.

- Alert 5: Aircraft is on the catapult with electrical and starting power already hooked up but not started, and the crew strapped in to their ejection seats. (Crews rotated every 2 hours.)
- Alert 15: Same as above, except the crew remains in the ready room in full flight gear.
- Alert 30: Aircraft remains on the cat, but the crew is free unless called.
- Alert 60: Aircrew is assigned; maintenance is allowed on the aircraft, as well as minor maintenance on the catapult and arresting gear.

== See also ==
- Alert crew
- Alert state
- COGCON
- DEFCON
- Mobilization
- Scrambling (military)
- List of established military terms
