= WATCHCON =

South Korean and US military alert system

WATCHCON (Watch Condition) is an alert state system used by and coordinated between the South Korean armed forces and United States Department of Defense to measure reconnaissance posture, utilized often in matters concerning North Korea.

== Hierarchy of Stages ==
There are four WATCHCON stages.

- WATCHCON 4 is in effect during normal peacetime.
- WATCHCON 3 is in effect amidst indications of an important threat.
- WATCHCON 2 is in effect amidst indications of a vital threat.
- WATCHCON 1 is in effect during wartime.

== See also ==
- DEFCON
- Force Protection Condition
- LERTCON
- REDCON
