= Threat level =

Threat level is a term used by governments to indicate the state of preparedness required by government servants with regard to threats to the state:

== Current ==
- UK Threat Levels, the system used by the United Kingdom since 2006
- National Terrorism Advisory System, the system used by the United States since 2011

== Former ==
- BIKINI state, the system used by the United Kingdom 1970–2006
- Homeland Security Advisory System, the system used by the United States 2002–2011
