= Alert Level System =

Alert Level System may refer to:

== COVID-19 ==
- COVID-19 Alert Levels System, Philippines
- Local COVID-19 Alert Levels, England
- COVID-19 alert levels in New Zealand

== Volcanoes ==
- Volcanic Alert Level, New Zealand
- Vanuatu Volcanic Alert Level
- Cascade Ranges volcano warning system, United States

== Other uses ==
- Terror Alert Level, U.S. Homeland Security
- MARSEC alert levels, U.S. Coast Guard
- UK Threat Levels, a terrorism alert system used in the United Kingdom.
