= DEFCON =

Alert posture used by the United States Armed Forces

DEFCON levels

The defense readiness condition (DEFCON) is an alert state used by the United States Armed Forces. The DEFCON system was developed in 1959 by the Joint Chiefs of Staff (JCS) and unified and specified combatant commands. It prescribes five graduated levels of readiness (or states of alert) for the U.S. military. It increases in severity from DEFCON 5 (least severe) to DEFCON 1 (most severe) to match varying military situations, with DEFCON 1 signaling the impending outbreak of nuclear warfare. For security reasons, the U.S. military does not announce a DEFCON level to the public.

DEFCONs are a subsystem of a series of "Alert Conditions", or LERTCONs, which also include Emergency Conditions (EMERGCONs).

== Definition ==
The DEFCON level is controlled primarily by the U.S. president and the U.S. secretary of defense through the chairman of the Joint Chiefs of Staff and the combatant commanders; each level defines specific security, activation and response scenarios for the personnel in question.

Different branches of the U.S. Armed Forces (i.e. U.S. Army, U.S. Navy, U.S. Air Force, U.S. Marine Corps, U.S. Coast Guard, U.S. Space Force) and different bases or command groups can be activated at different defense conditions. According to Air & Space/Smithsonian, as of 2022, the U.S. DEFCON level has never been more severe than DEFCON 3. The DEFCON 2 levels in the 1962 Cuban Missile Crisis and 1991 Gulf War applied only to the U.S. Strategic Air Command (SAC).

DEFCONs should not be confused with similar systems used by the US military, such as Force Protection Conditions (FPCONS), Readiness Conditions (REDCONS), Information Operations Condition (INFOCON) and its future replacement Cyber Operations Condition (CYBERCON), and Watch Conditions (WATCHCONS), or the former Homeland Security Advisory System used by the U.S. Department of Homeland Security.

Although a higher DEFCON number refers to a more relaxed defence posture, the term has been misused in popular culture in which "DEFCON 5" is incorrectly used to describe an active conflict situation (such as in the title of the video game Defcon 5), or more figuratively, to describe an aggravated state of mind ("going to DEFCON five").

== Levels ==
Defense readiness conditions vary between many commands and have changed over time, and the United States Department of Defense uses exercise terms when referring to the DEFCON levels during exercises. This is to prevent confusing exercise commands with actual operational commands.

On January 12, 1966, NORAD "proposed the adoption of the readiness conditions of the JCS system", and information about the levels was declassified in 2006:

Readiness condition	Exercise term	Description	Readiness
DEFCON 1	COCKED PISTOL	Nuclear war is imminent or has already begun	Maximum readiness. Immediate response.
DEFCON 2	FAST PACE	Next step to nuclear war	Armed forces ready to deploy and engage in less than six hours
DEFCON 3	ROUND HOUSE	Increase in force readiness above that required for normal readiness	Air Force ready to mobilize in fifteen minutes
DEFCON 4	DOUBLE TAKE	Increased intelligence watch and strengthened security measures	Above normal readiness
DEFCON 5	FADE OUT	Lowest state of readiness	Normal readiness

== History ==
After NORAD was created, the command used different readiness levels (Normal, Increased, Maximum) subdivided into eight conditions, e.g., the "Maximum Readiness" level had two conditions "Air Defense Readiness" and "Air Defense Emergency". In October 1959, JCS chairman Nathan F. Twining informed NORAD "that Canada and the U.S. had signed an agreement on increasing the operational readiness of NORAD forces during periods of international tension." After the agreement became effective on October 2, 1959, the JCS defined a system with DEFCONs in November 1959 for the military commands. The initial DEFCON system had "Alpha" and "Bravo" conditions (under DEFCON 3) and Charlie/Delta under DEFCON 4, plus an "Emergency" level higher than DEFCON 1 with two conditions: "Defense Emergency" and the highest, "Air Defense Emergency" ("Hot Box" and "Big Noise" for exercises).

The United States has never declared a readiness condition of DEFCON 1 to prepare for nuclear war.

== Instance of DEFCON 2 ==
=== Cuban Missile Crisis ===
During the Cuban Missile Crisis on October 16–28, 1962, the U.S. Armed Forces (with the exception of United States Army Europe (USAREUR)) were ordered to DEFCON 3. On October 24, Strategic Air Command (SAC) was ordered to DEFCON 2, while the rest of the U.S. Armed Forces remained at DEFCON 3. SAC remained at DEFCON 2 until November 15. While at DEFCON 2, 92.5% of SAC's weapons systems (approx. 1,479 strike aircraft; 182 Atlas, Titan, and Minuteman missiles; 2,962 total nuclear weapons; and available refueling tankers) were ready to launch within one hour, while its airborne alert program expanded to include one-eighth of SAC's bomber forces, allowing an average of 65 planes in the air in position to be directed at targets in the Soviet Union at any given time.

== Instances of DEFCON 3 ==
=== Yom Kippur War ===
On October 6, 1973, Egypt and Syria launched a joint attack on Israel resulting in the Yom Kippur War. The United States became concerned that the Soviet Union might intervene, and on October 25, US forces, including Strategic Air Command, Continental Air Defense Command, European Command and the Sixth Fleet, were placed at DEFCON 3.

According to documents declassified in 2016, the move to DEFCON 3 was motivated by CIA reports indicating that the Soviet Union had sent a ship to Egypt carrying nuclear weapons along with two other amphibious vessels. Soviet troops never landed and the declassified documents did not disclose the fate of the ship and its cargo.

Over the following days, the various forces reverted to normal status with the Sixth Fleet standing down on November 17.

=== Operation Paul Bunyan ===
Following the axe murder incident at Panmunjom on August 18, 1976, readiness levels for US forces in South Korea were increased to DEFCON 3, where they remained throughout Operation Paul Bunyan.

=== September 11 attacks ===
During the September 11 attacks, Secretary of Defense Donald Rumsfeld ordered the DEFCON level be increased to 3, and also a stand-by for a possible increase to DEFCON 2. It was lowered to DEFCON 4 on September 14.

== In popular culture ==
- WarGames (1983): raised to DEFCON 3, lowered to DEFCON 4, then raised back to DEFCON 3, to DEFCON 2, and finally to DEFCON 1
- Crimson Tide (1995): raised to DEFCON 4, to DEFCON 3, and finally to DEFCON 2
- Independence Day (1996): raised to DEFCON 3
- Beavis and Butt-Head Do America (1996): raised to DEFCON 4
- Armageddon (1998): raised to DEFCON 3
- Command & Conquer: Yuri's Revenge (2001): raised to DEFCON 2 in first movie during Allies mission
- Stargate SG-1:
  - in season one, episode 5 (The Broca Divide) (1997): DEFCON 1 living conditions mentioned;
  - in season three, episode 22 (Nemesis) (2000): raised to DEFCON 3, then to DEFCON 2;
  - in season four, episode 20 (Entity) (2001): raised to DEFCON 2;
  - in season seven, episode 22 (Lost City, Part 2) (2004) raised to DEFCON 3, then to DEFCON 1;
  - in season eight, episode 14 (Full Alert) (2005): raised to DEFCON 3, to DEFCON 2, and finally to DEFCON 1
- The West Wing in season one, episode 12 (He Shall, From Time to Time…) (2001): DEFCON 4 mentioned
- Olympus Has Fallen (2013): raised to DEFCON 4. The movie incorrectly identifies this as being "at war".
- Deutschland 83 (2015): raised to DEFCON 3, then to DEFCON 2 in season one, episode seven (Bold Guard), and finally to DEFCON 1 in season one, episode eight (Able Archer). This season depicted the 1983 Able Archer exercise.
- Designated Survivor: 60 Days in episode 2 (2019): DEFCON 2 mentioned
- For All Mankind in season two, episode 10 (2021): raised to DEFCON 2
- A House of Dynamite (2025): raised to DEFCON 4, to DEFCON 2, then to DEFCON 1
- Helldivers 2 (2024): uses a system called LIBCON (Liberty Readiness Condition) which is a reference to DEFCON

== See also ==
- COGCON – Continuity of government readiness level
- Combat readiness
- Doomsday Clock
- FPCON
- HURCON – Hurricane Condition threat rating (military-developed scale)
- National Command Authority (United States)
- National Military Command Center
- National Terrorism Advisory System
- Waffle House Index – Unofficial disaster recovery metric used by FEMA
- UK Threat Levels – Similar British system used for terrorism threats

Historic or defunct:

- BIKINI state
- CONELRAD
- Four-minute warning
- HANDEL
- Homeland Security Advisory System
- Preparing for Emergencies
- United States color-coded war plans
