= MARSEC =

Three-tiered maritime security system developed by the United States Coast Guard

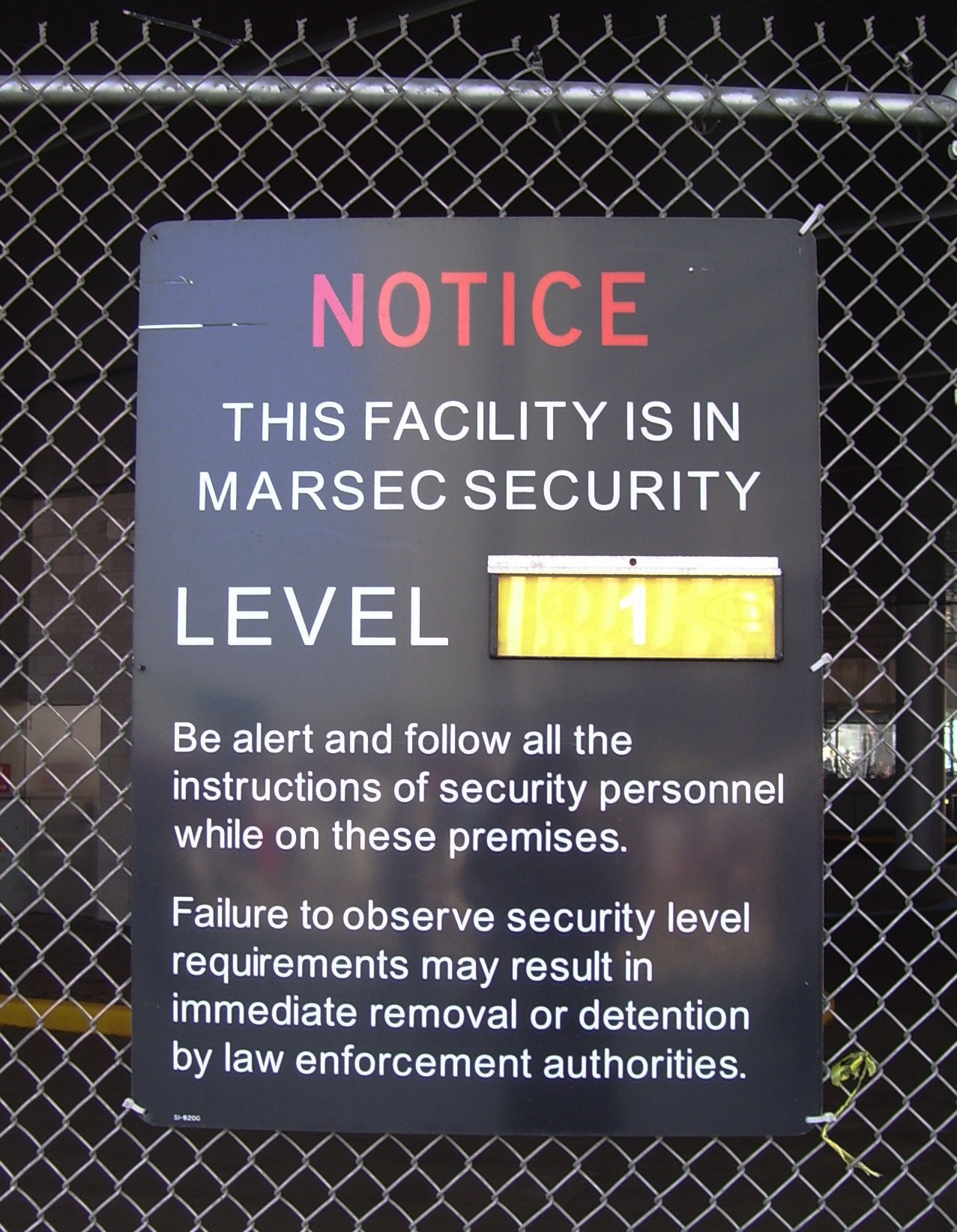
A MARSEC Level 1 sign on the Whitehall Ferry Terminal of the Staten Island Ferry in Manhattan, New York City

MARSEC (MARitime SECurity) is the North American three-tiered Maritime Security system (alert state). It is used by the Bahamas, Canada and United States. United States Coast Guard designed it to easily communicate to the Coast Guard and the maritime industry pre-planned scalable responses for credible threats. Its objective is to provide an assessment of possible terrorist activity within the maritime sectors of transportation, including threats to nautical facilities and vessels falling within the jurisdiction of the United States, the Bahamas and Canada that could be targets of attack.

The Coast Guard originally created MARSEC to be compatible with, and respond in unison to the Department of Homeland Security’s (DHS) Homeland Security Advisory System (HSAS). With the introduction of the National Terrorism Advisory System (NTAS) to replace HSAS, the Commandant of the Coast Guard will adjust the MARSEC Level, if appropriate, based on any NTAS Alert issued by DHS. As of 2005, Transport Canada also uses MARSEC levels as legislated in the Marine Transportation Security Regulations.

== Alert levels ==
Under the HSAS there were three levels to the system:

- Level 1 – Corresponding with the HSAS levels Green, Blue, or Yellow, or no NTAS threat.
- Level 2 – Corresponding with the heightened HSAS risk coded Orange, or an elevated NTAS threat.
- Level 3 – Corresponding with the probable and imminent HSAS risk level coded Red, or an imminent NTAS threat.

The current levels are:

Level 1	minimum appropriate security measures shall be maintained at all times
Level 2	appropriate additional protective security measures shall be maintained for a period of time as a result of heightened risk of a transportation security incident.
Level 3	MARSEC Level 3 means the level for which further specific protective security measures shall be maintained for a limited period of time when a transportation security incident is probable, imminent, or has occurred, although it may not be possible to identify the specific target.
