= Liverpool Women's Hospital bombing =

Explosion outside a hospital in England in 2021

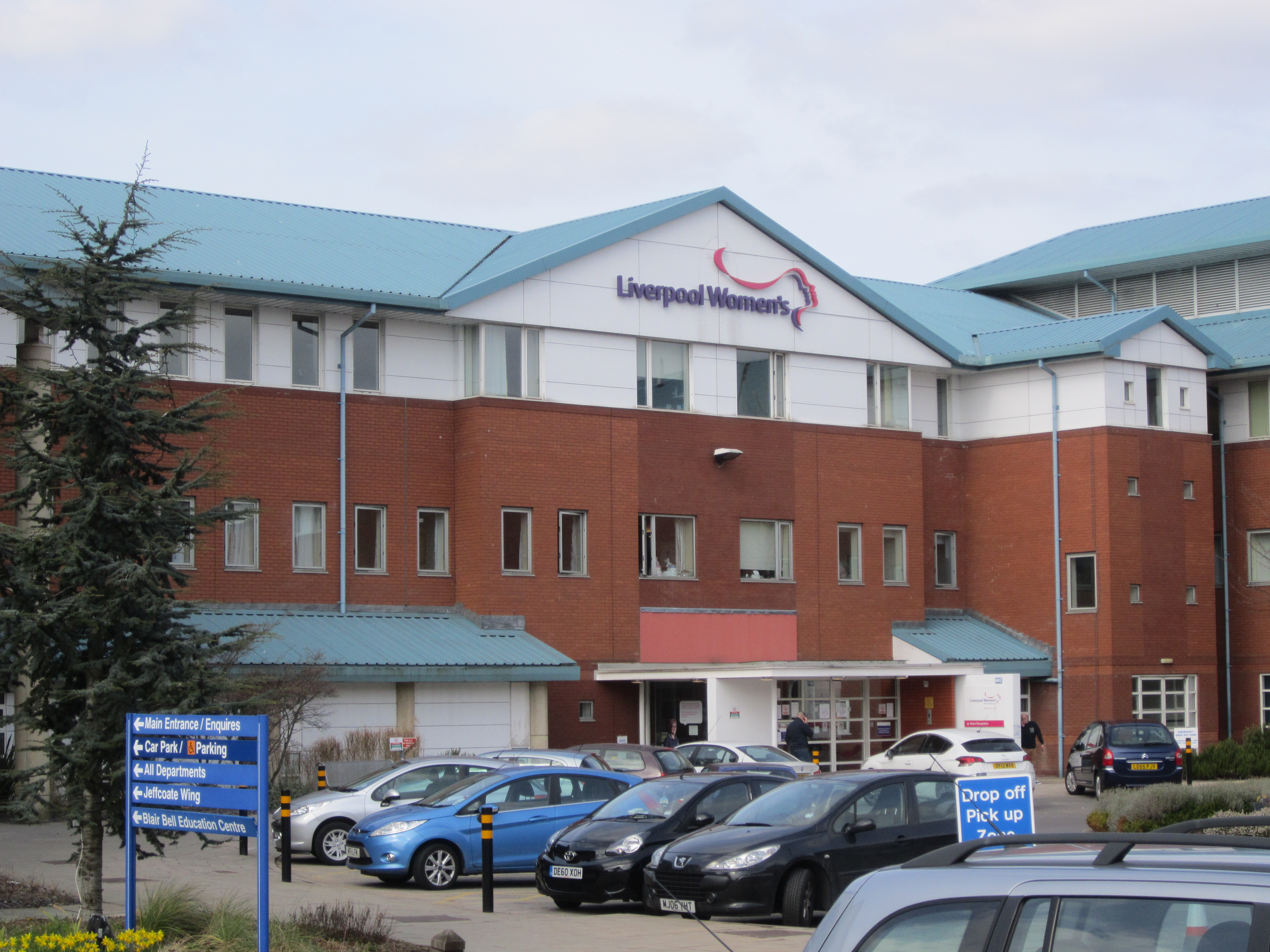
- Liverpool Women's Hospital general entrance and car park
- Location: 53°23′56″N 2°57′34″W; Liverpool Women's Hospital, Liverpool, England
- Date: 14 November 2021 c. 10:59 GMT (UTC±0)
- Attack type: Bombing, terrorism
- Weapon: Improvised explosive device
- Deaths: 1 (the perpetrator)
- Injuries: 3
- Perpetrator: Emad al-Swealmeen

On 14 November 2021, a taxi carrying a passenger, 32-year-old Emad al-Swealmeen, arrived at the main entrance of Liverpool Women's Hospital in Liverpool, England. An improvised explosive device (IED) carried by the passenger ignited, killing him and injuring the driver. The police later declared it to be a terrorist incident; the perpetrator had been refused asylum in 2014, lost appeals in 2015, and lived in England until his attack.

At the official inquest, on 30 December 2021, it was found that the device, manufactured and carried by the passenger, had been "designed to project shrapnel, with murderous intent". A counter-terrorism investigation concluded in October 2023 that the attacker was most likely motivated by the rejection of his asylum claim, combined with mental health issues.

== Incident ==
On 14 November 2021, at approximately 10:59 am GMT, an explosion occurred inside a taxi as it arrived in front of the main entrance of the Liverpool Women's Hospital in Liverpool, England. The driver left the vehicle seconds later and ran to safety, after which a fire badly burned the car. The explosion was caused by an improvised explosive device carried by the taxi's passenger, who was killed. The taxi driver was admitted to hospital with injuries including an ear needing to be sewn back on. He was released the following day. Merseyside Police attended along with fire and ambulance crews and the Royal Logistic Corps' Bomb Squad. The hospital was placed under a lockdown, roads were closed and a cordon was in place around the hospital by the evening, with armed police in attendance.

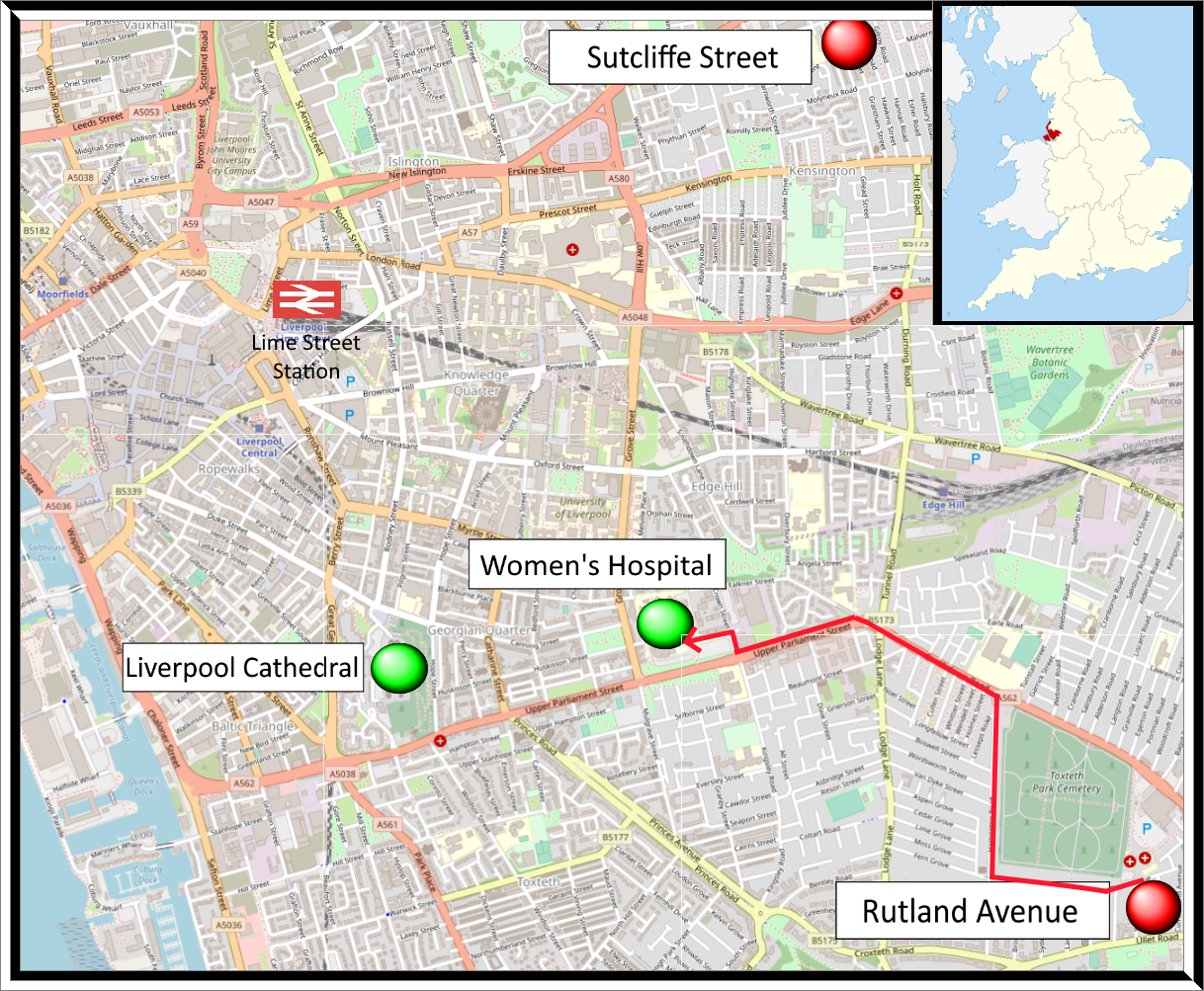
Geography of events, including the route of the taxi journey.

The passenger's motivation was not immediately known. One theory emerged that he was intending to walk the short distance to Liverpool's Anglican cathedral, and detonate his device as thousands of veterans, military personnel, and members of the public left the Remembrance Sunday service for the subsequent parade. The explosion occurred shortly before the associated two-minute silence usually observed at 11 am. The police said one line of enquiry was whether the event was linked to nearby remembrance events.

== Investigation ==
It was established that the taxi driver picked up the passenger in Rutland Avenue, approximately 10 minutes drive from the hospital. Early reports suggested that on arrival he locked the doors of his vehicle on his passenger before it went up in flames, although a Counterterrorism spokesman noted that officers had not yet spoken to the driver as of Sunday evening.

Police subsequently confirmed that the fire had been caused by the ignition of a home-made explosive device. Merseyside Police armed units raided a property in the Sefton Park area, although the BBC reported that police had not confirmed whether the two incidents were related. Three men aged 29, 26, and 21 were arrested in Liverpool in the early morning of the next day, under the Terrorism Act. Police later said the arrests were a direct response to the attack. A fourth man, aged 20, was arrested the next day, 15 November. The arrest of the fourth man turned into a siege at the property he was in, and police negotiators were deployed. This arrest was supported by United Kingdom Special Forces. A number of houses in the Sefton Park area were evacuated. The Independent noted that this was a "usual precaution ... where explosive materials are suspected or found". A controlled explosion was carried out in the middle of Sefton Park, "a few hundred metres" from the house in Rutland Avenue where bomb-making equipment was discovered. The four arrested men were released on 15 November, the police saying "We are satisfied with the accounts they have provided and they have been released from police custody".

=== Perpetrator ===
The suspected perpetrator died during the incident. He was identified, a day after the explosion, as 32-year-old Emad al-Swealmeen, who was reported as having changed his name to Enzo Almeni; he was not known to MI5. A post-mortem found he died from injuries caused by the explosion and fire. He came to the UK on holiday in 2014, to watch Britain's Got Talent in Belfast, having applied for a visa in the United Arab Emirates. He claimed asylum as a Syrian refugee, which was denied as officials believed him to be Jordanian rather than Syrian; his immigration status at the time of the incident is unknown. Seven years before the incident he was sectioned after trying to kill himself and waving a knife in Liverpool city centre; following this he converted from Islam to Christianity in 2015. He had served time in a Middle East prison for serious assault. Police said that they believed he had lived at the Sutcliffe Street address for some time but had recently started renting a property in Rutland Avenue, where the bomb was made. Two days prior to the incident, al-Swealmeen called his brother, who lives in the United States, to say he might do "something bad".

Reports suggested that al-Swealmeen had converted to Christianity solely for asylum purposes, but the Church of England said that there was no evidence that converts' asylum claims are fast-tracked. He had been baptised in 2015 and confirmed in 2017, before losing contact with Liverpool Cathedral the following year; the Church of England said that it had processes in place "for discerning whether someone might be expressing a genuine commitment to faith". His most recent denial of asylum was in January 2020, due to concerns that his claimed conversion to Christianity was not genuine. It was later revealed by investigators that al-Swealmeen had reverted to Islam months before the attack. A coroner determined the improvised explosive device was made with "murderous intent" but it was unclear if the device was intended to detonate when it did.

Police found a Quran and prayer mat when searching al-Swealmeen's premises. Coroner Andre Rebello said: "It was fairly evident that he carried out the religious duties of someone who is a follower of Islam, not withstanding the reported conversion to Christianity."

In October 2023, an investigation by Counter Terrorism Police North West concluded that al-Swealmeen's most likely grievance was his rejected asylum claim, combined with mental ill health.

=== Device ===
The explosive device was handmade by the suspect using components and chemicals purchased over several months, often using a false name. How the purchases were made is being investigated. Ball bearings were found to have been used inside the weapon, which would have increased its lethality had it detonated normally. Police said the partial detonation at the hospital may have been triggered prematurely from movement of the vehicle or during final assembly. They also stated the weapon was different from the bomb used in the 2017 Manchester Arena bombing.

== Response ==
The driver was widely praised by members of the public and media following the incident, with some calling him a "hero" for stopping al-Swealmeen from getting inside the hospital by locking the doors of his taxi. Prime Minister Boris Johnson congratulated the driver, saying "it does look as though the taxi driver in question did behave with incredible presence of mind and bravery". On 15 November 2021, the police declared the explosion a terrorist incident, and the UK terror threat level was raised from substantial to severe. (Note: This increase in alert indicated that further attacks were considered highly likely due to two attacks in a month. The threat level is set by the Joint Terrorism Analysis Centre, which is led by MI5. The previous attack was the murder of David Amess, Conservative MP for Southend West, who was stabbed in a church hall on 15 October 2021.) MI5 joined the investigation on the same day of the incident in a support role for the local police, while COBR met on the morning of 15 November.

Home Secretary Priti Patel said that the bombing showed that Britain's asylum system is "dysfunctional" and that a "merry-go-round" of appeals by lawyers was keeping failed asylum seekers in the country.

The inquest was held at Liverpool and Wirral Coroner's Court on 30 December 2021. The senior coroner concluded that al-Swealmeen had "manufactured the improvised explosive device, designed to project shrapnel, with murderous intent."

Merseyside Police assistant chief constable Jon Roy said following their investigation in 2023 that "In the face of adversity, [the public] were strong and determined and unbowed. Ultimately, the aim of terrorists is to create conflict, distrust and fear, but that didn't happen here and people across Liverpool stood shoulder to shoulder".
