= Terror alert system =

Terror alert systems are standardised emergency population warning systems for describing and disseminating information about terrorism-related threats. They became more popular after the September 11 attacks on the United States in 2001.

== Australia ==
National Counter-Terrorism Alert Level

- Certain - terrorist attack is imminent or has occurred
- Expected- terrorist attack is highly likely
- Probable - terrorist attack is likely
- Possible - terrorist attack could occur
- Low - terrorist attack is not expected

Administered by the Federal Attorney-General's Department.

== France ==
Plan Vigipirate

- Yellow - to stress vigilance
- Orange - to warn of terrorist action
- Red - to warn of serious attempts
- Crimson - to warn of major attempts

== Ireland (Republic of) ==
International Terror Threat Level

- Low: An attack is deemed unlikely.
- Moderate: An attack is possible, but not likely.
- Substantial: An attack is a strong possibility.
- Severe: An attack is highly likely.
- Critical: An attack is imminent or has occurred.

Administered by the Garda Síochána.

Since November 2015, the international terrorism threat level is considered to be at moderate, meaning an attack is "possible but not likely".

== Russia ==
- Blue - an unconfirmed information about real terroristic threat
- Yellow - a confirmed information about real terroristic threat
- Red - an information about committed terrorist act

== United Kingdom ==
- Low - an attack is unlikely
- Moderate - an attack is possible, but not likely
- Substantial - an attack is a strong possibility
- Severe - an attack is highly likely
- Critical - an attack is expected imminently or has occurred

Administered by the Joint Terrorist Analysis Centre

== United States ==
Homeland Security Advisory System

- Low - Low risk of terrorist attacks
- Guarded - General risk of terrorist attacks
- Elevated - Significant risk of terrorist attacks
- High - High risk of terrorist attacks
- Severe - Severe risk of terrorist attacks

Administered by the Department of Homeland Security

National Terrorism Advisory System

- Elevated Threat - Significant or high risk of terrorist attacks
- Imminent Threat - Critical risk of terrorist attacks
