= HURCON =

Hurricane alert scale

Hurricane Condition (HURCON) is an alert scale used by the United States Armed Forces in the North Atlantic and the North Pacific to indicate the state of emergency or preparedness for an approaching hurricane. This designation is especially important to installations in the southern Atlantic region, as it is most affected by hurricanes. In the western Pacific, where hurricanes are referred to as typhoons, the scale is called Tropical Cyclone Condition of Readiness (TCCOR). A HURCON or TCCOR can be issued up to 96 hours before a hurricane is expected to strike the installation.

== HURCON conditions ==
As of 2021, the scale – which has been updated several times, and has minor variations between different military bases – consists of 5 levels, from HURCON 5 to HURCON 1, with three additional sub-levels for HURCON 1. As with civilian alerts, buildings may be boarded up and personnel evacuated. In addition; aircraft, ships, equipment, and other assets will be relocated, tied down, bunkered, or otherwise secured. The contraction was chosen in line with other military terminology in use like DEFCON and FPCON to communicate hazardous conditions.

HURCON	Hours	Criteria	Instructions
5	96	Destructive winds are possible within 96 hours.	Monitor weather stations. Review family/personal plan. Inspect/inventory shelter or evacuation kit. Check vehicles, prescriptions and food. Brief family members on situation. Determine plan for pets. Ensure vehicle and generator fuel tanks are full.
4	72	Destructive winds are possible within 72 hours.	Ensure you have completed all steps/precautions listed for HURCON 5. Continue to monitor local T.V. and radio. Prepare home for hurricane. Clear yard of loose materials that could possibly turn into projectiles. Update Air Force Personnel Accountability and Assessment System (AFPAAS). Identify closest shelter.
3	48	Destructive winds are possible within 48 hours.	Ensure you have completed steps/precautions listed for HURCON 4 and 5. Finish preparations for storm. Gather evacuation items. Secure home and belongings. Prepare for potential evacuation.
2	24	Destructive winds are possible within 24 hours.	Ensure you have completed all steps/precautions listed for HURCON 3, 4 and 5. Monitor T.V. and radio. Brief family members on evacuation/ride out plan. If going to a shelter, don't forget evacuation/shelter kit. Remain in shelter until released by proper officials.
1	12	Destructive winds are possible within 12 hours.	Ensure you have completed all steps/precautions listed for HURCON 2, 3, 4 and 5. Evacuate if still safe to do so. Monitor T.V. and radio. Remain in shelter until released by proper officials. If not sheltered, find shelter immediately, or prepare to “ride-out” in your home.
1C	0	Caution: Winds of 40-57 mph sustained are occurring.	All outside activity is prohibited. Remain in shelter until released by proper officials. If not sheltered, find shelter immediately.
1E	0	Emergency: Winds of 58 mph sustained and/or gusts of 69 mph or greater are occurring.	Remain in shelter until released by proper officials.
1R		Recovery: Surface winds in excess of 58 mph are no longer occurring and storm has passed.	Non-essential functions remain closed unless directed otherwise by the wing commander. All but emergency personnel remain in quarters until further notice. If evacuated do not return to base until directed to do so.

== TCCOR conditions ==
As of 2021, TCCOR consists of TCCOR 5 to TCCOR 1, three additional sub-levels for TCCOR 1, TCCOR Storm Watch, and TCCOR All Clear.

TCCOR	Hours	Criteria	Instructions
5	96	Destructive winds are possible within 96 hours. Only used outside of the typical typhoon season; from December 1 to May 31.	Review all other TCCOR level actions.
4	72	Destructive sustained winds of 50 knots or greater possible within 72 hours. Lowest level of alert during the typhoon season (June 1-November 30)	Stock up and maintain 72 hours' worth of food, bottled water, dry milk, batteries, flashlights, candles and other emergency supplies.
3	48	Destructive sustained winds of 50 knots or greater possible within 48 hours.	Fill vehicles and gas grill tanks. Clean debris from gutters and storm drains.
2	24	Destructive sustained winds of 50 knots or greater anticipated within 24 hours.	Secure all outdoor property such as picnic tables, barbecue grills, etc. Place sandbags on doorsills.
1	12	Destructive sustained winds of 50 knots or greater are anticipated within 12 hours.	Fill any available containers with water. Turn refrigerator/freezer to coldest setting. DODDs schools are closed. Individuals in low lying areas where flooding may occur may move inland.
1C	0	Caution: Winds of 35-49 knots sustained are occurring (at a particular installation).	Pregnant women at 37 weeks (34 weeks w/twins) report to Naval Hospital. Pick up children from child development centers & school age programs as soon as possible. Commissary & AAFES are closed. Monitor AFN for updates.
1E	0	Emergency: Destructive winds are occurring (at a particular installation).	All outside activities are prohibited. Report damage/utility outages to Housing Maintenance. Be patient and remain indoors.
1R		Recovery: Destructive winds have subsided and are no longer forecast to occur.	Survey and work crews are sent out to determine the extent of damage and to establish safe zones around hazards (e.g., downed power lines, unstable structures). All outside activities are prohibited. Essential base recovery is occurring.
Storm Watch		Strong winds are possibly due to proximity of a tropical cyclone.	Monitor for changes in TCCOR and services closure information.
All Clear		Destructive winds have passed and no longer forecast to occur. Recovery efforts are considered complete.	Report damage & outages to Housing Maintenance. Reset refrigerator/freezer settings. Remove sandbags from doorsills.

=== Notes ===
- It is possible to return to TCCOR Storm Watch or TCCOR 4 from a higher level of alert if the storm is no longer forecast to reach destructive wind criteria at the installation.
- Destructive wind criteria: 50 knots sustained or gust factors of 60 knots or greater.
