= Combat readiness =

Condition of armed forces

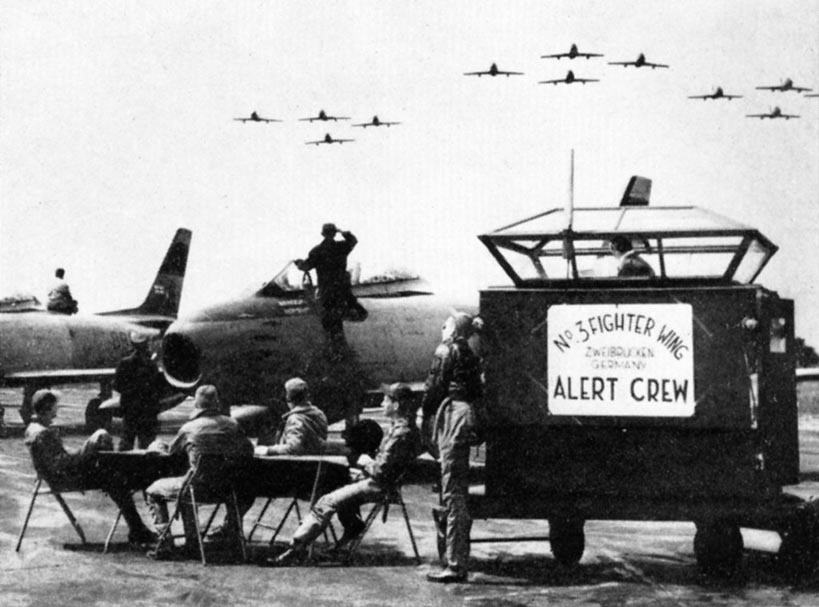
Royal Canadian Air Force alert crew at Zweibrücken Air Base in West Germany waiting to scramble in 1957

Combat readiness is a condition of the armed forces and their constituent units and formations, warships, aircraft, weapon systems or other military technology and equipment to perform during combat military operations, or functions consistent with the purpose for which they are organized or designed, or the managing of resources and personnel training in preparation for combat.

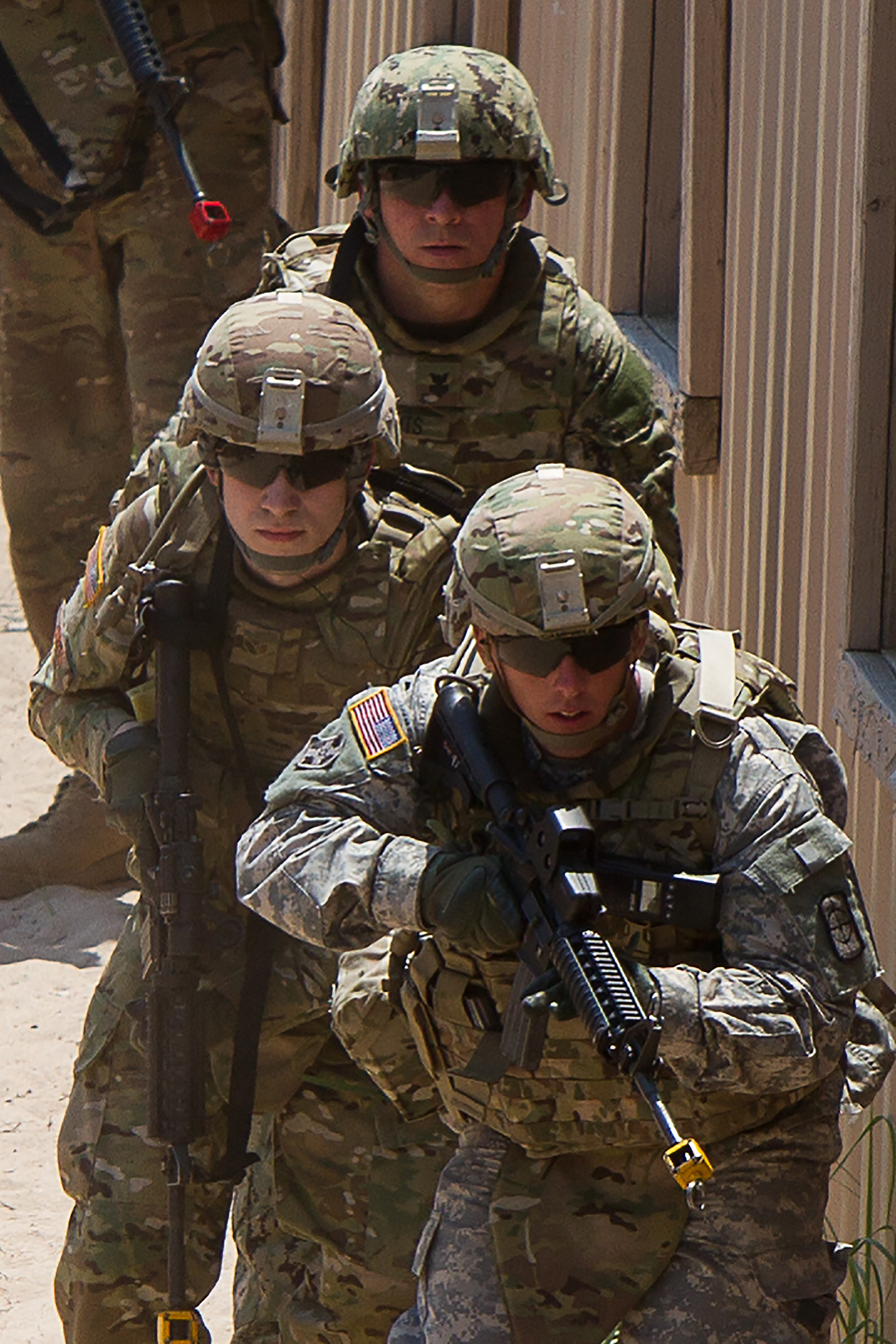
Three United States Armed Forces rear and non-combat personnel—a U.S. Army military construction supervisor, a U.S. Air Force cyber transport technician, and a U.S. Navy cook—during combat training to ensure combat readiness, in 2014

Different armed forces maintain different levels of readiness for the troops to engage in combat, varying from minutes to months; economic considerations are a major factor in explaining the variation.

== See also ==
- Alert crew
- Alert state
- COGCON
- DEFCON
- Mobilization
- Scrambling (military)
- List of established military terms

== Citations ==
- Andrews, Robert P. & Shambo, James F., (thesis), A system dynamics analysis of the factors affecting combat readiness, Faculty of the School of Systems and Logistics of the Air Force Institute of Technology, Air University, June 1980
- Jordan, Thomas M. (September–December 2000). "Improving Combat Readiness: Developing and Implementing Effective Training". Infantry Magazine. 90 (3). Archived from the original on November 9, 2010 – via FindArticles.
- Kruys, G.P.H., Combat readiness with specific reference to armies, (Chapter Five), Institute for Strategic Studies, University of Pretoria, Institute for Strategic Studies 2001
