= Alert state =

Military forces on forms of threat

An alert state, alert level, or state of alert is an indication of the state of readiness of a country's the armed forces for military action to respond to military attack, terrorism, or natural disasters. The phrase frequently used is "on high alert". Examples of scales indicating alert state are the DEFCON levels of the US military, South Korea's "Jindogae" system, and the UK Threat Levels. High alert states are synonymous with "red alert".

== See also ==
- Combat readiness
- EMERGCON
- FPCON
- INFOCON
- LERTCON
- REDCON
- Situation awareness
- Torino scale
- COGCON

Historic/Defunct:

- United States color-coded war plans
- HANDEL
- Homeland Security Advisory System
- BIKINI state
- CONELRAD
- Four-minute warning
- Preparing for Emergencies
