= LERTCON =

US military term for "alert condition"

In United States military doctrine, LERTCON is an abbreviation of alert condition, and is a measure of the level of action and readiness to be taken in a given situation. LERTCON is used by US and Allied forces who are assigned to NATO. There are specific procedures laid out for responses to changes in LERTCON. LERTCON levels can be broken down into high-alert emergency condition levels (EMERGCONs) and the more common Defense Condition levels (DEFCONs).

== Levels ==
- LERTCON 5/4: Peacetime conditions
- LERTCON 3.5: Military vigilance
- LERTCON 3: Simple alert
- LERTCON 2: Reinforced alert
- LERTCON 1: General alert

== See also ==
- FPCON
- INFOCON
- DEFCON
- REDCON
- Alert state
