= EMERGCON =

United States readiness level

EMERGCON (emergency condition) is a state of readiness that is separate from DEFCON, or defense readiness condition used by the United States, in that it incorporates civilian measures in addition to the DEFCON military measures.

== Overview ==
Generally, EMERGCONs are a state of readiness following an ICBM (intercontinental ballistic missile) attack. Other forces go to DEFCON 1 during EMERGCONs. There are two types of EMERGCONs:

- Defense Emergency: A major hostile attack on United States and/or allied forces overseas, and/or an overt action made against the United States. This must be confirmed by a unified commander or higher authority.
- Air Defense Emergency: A major hostile attack by aircraft or missiles seems probable, is imminent, or is taking place on the continental United States, Canada, or Greenland. This declaration is made by the Commander of the North American Aerospace Defense Command (NORAD).

Although the United States military has gone into defense readiness at various times (such as the Cuban Missile Crisis), it has never had an EMERGCON.

== See also ==
- DEFCON
- LERTCON
- REDCON
- Alert state
- Information Operations Condition
