= Alert crew =

In the armed forces, most often in military aviation and in land-based missile forces, an alert crew is a group of members of units and formations that maintains a group level of combat readiness. Although it sometimes encompasses the entire unit, today the term is more used for a set group of individuals.

== History ==
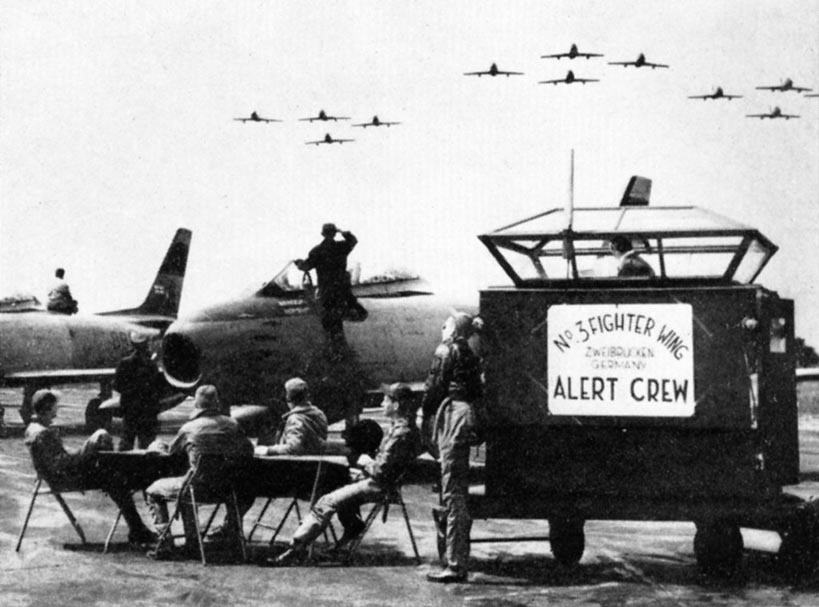
RCAF alert crew at Zweibrücken Air Base, Germany in 1957 waiting to scramble with the Canadair Sabre jet fighters

=== World War I and World War II ===
Although alert crews were probably in use during World War I, the term primarily came of use during World War II, as single seat fighter pilots or multi-seat fighter/pursuit aircraft crews would be scrambled to intercept enemy fighter or bomber aircraft, as was most notably characterized by the Royal Air Force (RAF) during the Battle of Britain in 1940. The concept was later adopted by other services, such as fighter elements (albeit known as "pursuit" aircraft at the time) of the U.S. Army Air Forces.

=== Cold War and strategic forces ===
After World War II ended and the Cold War began, the United States, its NATO and other allies, and the Soviet Union and its Warsaw Pact and other allies would keep a combination of strategic and tactical air and missile forces on alert.

With the establishment of the Strategic Air Command (SAC) and the redesignation of the United States Air Force (USAF), SAC began to include its nuclear strike bomber and aerial refueling aircraft on alert status. At the same time, USAF's Air Defense Command, later renamed the Aerospace Defense Command and later integrated into Tactical Air Command (TAC), would keep dedicated single-seat and multi-seat fighter-interceptor aircraft on 24/7/365 alert, to include those TAC-gained interceptors assigned to the Air National Guard, to defend US territory and air bases. This would later incorporate fighter aircraft of the Royal Canadian Air Force (RCAF) in defense of the North American continent under the aegis of the joint US-Canadian North American Air Defense Command (NORAD), later renamed the North American Aerospace Defense Command.

Other NATO/Allied air forces with a nuclear strike capability, most notably the RAF, would also keep bomber and aerial refueling aircraft on alert during the Cold War.

Conversely, the principal adversary of the period, the Soviet Union, also kept their manned bomber and strategic missile forces on alert in similar fashion.

The United States' experience in maintaining a vast network of alert air crews, and later intercontinental ballistic missiles (ICBM) crews, represents the penultimate iteration of the alert crew concept. SAC crews on alert duty would typically be on alert for seven days out of a 21-day period, while being on rotational alert duty. During their alert duty, they would fly training missions to help keep their skills sharpened and occupy the time. With the introduction of B-47 Stratojet and B-52 Stratofortress bomber aircraft, SAC alert crew members would live apart from the main complex of their respective air base, typically in a Readiness Crew Building known as a "Mole Hole", adjacent to an Alert Apron / Alert Ramp facility colloquially named a "Christmas Tree". These facilities functioned as a home away from home for the bomber and aerial refueling aircraft flight crews for the duration of their alert duty. If the klaxon was sounded, alert crews would exit the mole holes and literally run out to their waiting planes, which would be ready at a moment's notice to launch. As SAC introduced strategic ICBM's into its nuclear strike inventory, these systems were also manned by alert crews, typically pulling one 24-hour alert duty period every 72 hours in hardened underground launch facilities either adjacent to or in the vicinity of their missiles.

Augmenting this arrangement was a SAC airborne command post known as Looking Glass. Using modified EC-135 aircraft, Looking Glass functioned as SAC's alternate command post, with one aircraft always airborne 24/7/365 from its inception until the end of the Cold War. As the Cold War ended, the bomber and tanker combinations were taken off of constant alert and the USAF EC-135 aircraft superseded by the U.S. Navy's E-6 Mercury TACAMO aircraft in the Looking Glass role for SAC's post-Cold War successor, the United States Strategic Command (USSTRATCOM).

In lieu of "Christmas Tree" facilities, the smaller size of USAF fighter and fighter-interceptor aircraft enabled them to be stationed in individual alert hangars during the Cold War, typically located very close to a runway, but separate from their bomber and tanker counterparts.

With the end of the Cold War, in addition to the alert posture of their strategic bomber fleets, the United States and other nations drastically scaled back their fighter alert posture, with the U.S. relegating the mission to a handful of Air National Guard fighter wings. However, following the airliner hijackings and subsequent attacks of September 11, 2001, both the U.S. and other NATO and Pacific Rim nations upgraded their fighter alert postures markedly. Today, fighter aircraft still are stationed on alert throughout the world, ready to launch at a moment's notice.

The USAF's Boeing E-4 fleet, previously operated by SAC and now operated by Air Combat Command (ACC), is also always on constant alert, due to it being designed as a mobile command post for the National Command Authority (namely the President of the United States), the Secretary of Defense, and presidential successors.

=== Alert crews in naval aviation ===
In the U.S. Navy, outside of the land-based TACAMO mission, alert crews have historically been organized and managed in a different fashion. During the Cold War, two land-based maritime patrol P-3 Orion aircraft were typically kept on Ready Alert at multiple stateside and forward deployed operating bases. One pre-flighted aircraft and crew was kept ready to launch within one hour of notification and a second within three hours, typically in response to high priority Soviet Navy submarine targets of interest.

On deployed aircraft carriers underway, in between routine flight operations in regions where flyovers by potentially hostile aircraft were possible, two to four Navy and/or embarked U.S. Marine Corps fighter aircraft would be placed on or in the vicinity of catapults, armed, manned and ready to launch within 5 minutes of notification. This was characterized during the 1960s to present day by F-8 Crusader aircraft, followed by the F-4 Phantom II, the F-14 Tomcat, and today by the F/A-18 Hornet and F/A-18 Super Hornet. This "Ready Five" alert was augmented by a Ready 15 alert of pre-flighted, armed, but unmanned aircraft near the catapults with the pilot or crew standing by in the squadron's ready room, ostensibly able to launch within 15 minutes. Alert flight crews for airborne early warning, fixed-wing and rotary-wing anti-submarine warfare, and search and rescue helicopters were similarly established as required, typically in a Ready 15 or Ready 30 mode. This model was employed during the Cold War and continues to be employed to this day, especially when U.S. Navy aircraft carriers and their strike groups are operating in areas of increased international tension.

== See also ==
- Ready 5/Alert 5
