= Joint Terrorism Analysis Centre =

UK intelligence organisation

Coordinates: 51°29′38.3″N 0°07′32.2″W

Organization overview
- Formed: June 2003
- Headquarters: Thames House
- Minister responsible: Secretary of State for the Home Department
- Organization executive: Ken McCallum, Director General
- Parent Organization: MI5

The Joint Terrorism Analysis Centre (JTAC) is an intelligence body linked to the UK Security Service that assesses terrorist threats and advises the government and operators of critical national infrastructure.

Operating from Thames House on Millbank in central London, JTAC provides regular assessments to government departments and major companies and institutions, predominantly in the transport, financial services, utilities and telecommunications industries.

== Organisation ==
The Director of JTAC reports to the Director General of the Security Service (commonly known as MI5), and directs a staff including personnel from the Security Service, Secret Intelligence Service (commonly known as MI6), Government Communications Headquarters (GCHQ), Defence Intelligence Staff, Counter Terrorism Policing and six other government departments. Staff working at JTAC are seconded from other organisations but remain under the control of their original employers.

As a body closely related to the Security Service, JTAC is bound by the provisions of the Intelligence Services Act 1994 and is subject to the oversight of the Intelligence and Security Committee.

== Dissemination of information ==
Assessments are used to inform the threat levels disseminated through the Security Service, Home Office and Ministry of Defence. Until very recently these threat levels were promulgated in a form known as the BIKINI state and Tesseral State. The current threat system is similar to, and largely aligned with, the US Department of Homeland Security rating system.

== Threat levels ==
The range of five available threat levels is:

- Low – an attack is unlikely
- Moderate – an attack is possible, but not likely
- Substantial – an attack is likely
- Severe – an attack is highly likely
- Critical – an attack is highly likely in the near future

This is a reduction from the previous seven levels in order to simplify communication to the general public.

== Public attention ==
JTAC rose to public prominence following the terrorist attacks in London in July 2005. Media reporting highlighted a reduction in the threat level from "Severe General" to "Substantial" based on the assessment that the risk of an attack was at its lowest point since 9/11. These news reports were the first release of threat gradings outside the Critical National Infrastructure.

== See also ==
- British intelligence agencies
- Counter-terrorism
- Threat level (disambiguation)
- National Counterterrorism Center (NCTC) – a similar body in the United States
