= BIKINI state =

Former alert state of the UK

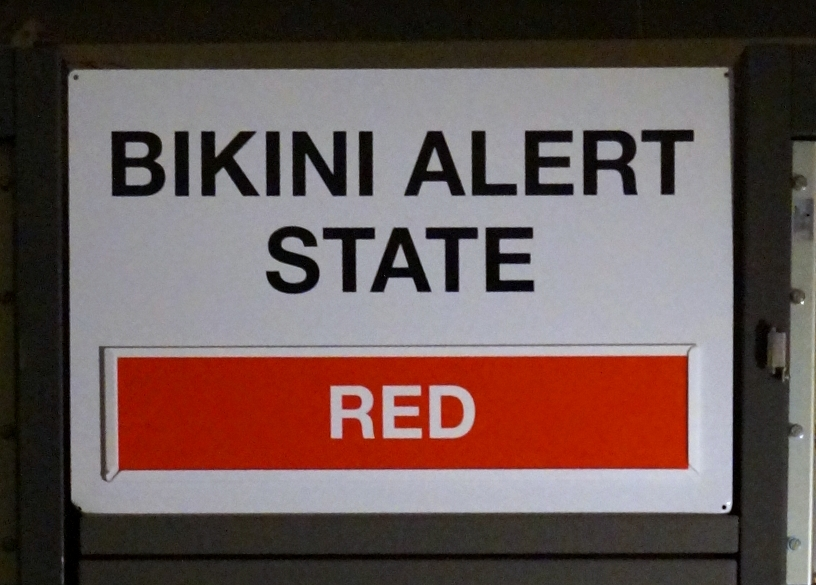
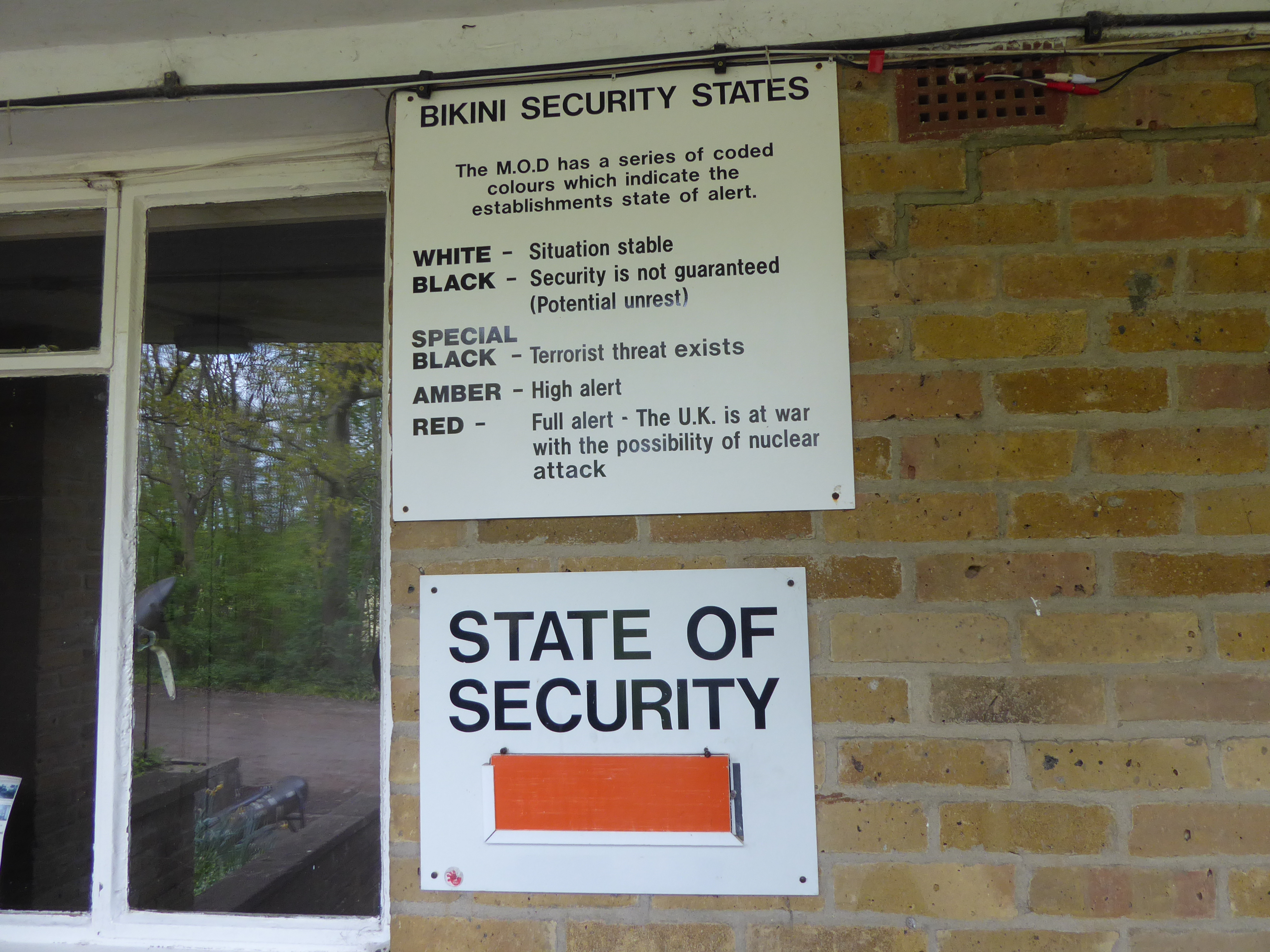
Bikini alert state signage at the Hack Green bunker (left, set at "Red") and the Kelvedon Hatch bunker (right, damaged sign which was previously set at "[Black] Special").

The Bikini state was an alert state indicator previously used by the UK Ministry of Defence to warn of non-specific forms of threat, including civil disorder, terrorism or war. Signs giving the current alert state were displayed at the entrance to government buildings and military installations. It was established on 19 May 1970. According to the Ministry of Defence, the word "bikini" was randomly selected by a computer.

Whilst similar to the DEFCON (defence readiness condition) alert states used in the United States, the Bikini levels were defined by the section of the military or organisation rather than UK-wide, and as a result, countermeasures and reactions to differing states may differ as acutely as from building to building. The highest levels of alert, Red and Amber, were only intended to be maintained for limited times. The White state has rarely been used, and is only known to have been used for periods between the Good Friday Agreement of 1998 and 11 September 2001.

The system was illustrated in the British television drama Threads, produced by the BBC in 1984.

It was replaced by a more general and public terrorism alert status, the UK Threat Levels, an alert state system in use by the British government since 1 August 2006.

== Bikini alert states ==
(most serious at top)
RED	Information has been received about an attack on a specific target. It can also mean "red alert", meaning the United Kingdom is at war, especially if there is a likelihood of a nuclear strike.
AMBER	There has been specific information received and there is a substantial threat to government targets. It can also mean "high alert", which could be a transition to war.
BLACK SPECIAL SPECIAL	There is an increased likelihood of an attack, but no defined target. It can also mean "potential terrorist threat".
BLACK	There has been an assessment made that there is the possibility of an attack, but no defined target. It can also mean "possible civil unrest", meaning safety cannot be guaranteed.
WHITE	No information available about a specific threat. It can also mean "situation stable"

== NATO military alert state ==
In addition to Bikini alerts that applied to individual installation NATO had a "Counter-Surprise" Military Alert System to mobilise its military forces.

NATO Counter-Surprise alert states (most serious at top)
SCARLET	Enemy attack expected within minutes (the alert may have been triggered by enemy aircraft penetrating NATO airspace). Deployment as ORANGE alert state where time permits, plus anti-aircraft weapons manned. Aircraft awaiting combat orders.
ORANGE	Triggered by Intelligence reports suggesting the enemy are preparing to launch an attack within 36 hours. NATO forces go to a high state of operational readiness. Communication networks, War Headquarters and C & R manned. Forces dispersed and moved to operational locations.

== See also ==
- Handel (warning system) UK Cold War warning system
- UK Threat Levels
- Homeland Security Advisory System (United States)
- Vigipirate (France)
