= Homeland Security Advisory System =

Terrorism alert warning system

Homeland Security Advisory System color chart

In the United States, the Homeland Security Advisory System (HSAS) was a color-coded terrorism threat advisory scale created in March 2002 under the Bush administration in response to the September 11 attacks. The different levels triggered specific actions by federal agencies and state and local governments, and they affected the level of security at some airports and other public facilities. It was often called the "terror alert level" by the U.S. media. The system was replaced on April 27, 2011, with a new system called the National Terrorism Advisory System.

== History ==
The system was created by Homeland Security Presidential Directive 3 on March 11, 2002, in response to the September 11 attacks. It was meant to provide a "comprehensive and effective means to disseminate information regarding the risk of terrorist acts to federal, state, and local authorities and to the American people." It was unveiled March 12, 2002, by Tom Ridge, then the Assistant to the President for Homeland Security. However, responsibility for developing, implementing and managing the system was given to the U.S. Attorney General.

In January 2003, the new Department of Homeland Security (DHS) began administering the system. The decision to publicly announce threat conditions is made by the Secretary of Homeland Security in consultation with the Assistant to the President for Homeland Security, according to Homeland Security Presidential Directive-5.

On January 27, 2011, Secretary of Homeland Security Janet Napolitano announced that the Homeland Security Advisory System would be replaced by a new two-level National Terrorism Advisory System in April 2011. Napolitano, who made the announcement at George Washington University, said the color-coded system often presented "little practical information" to the public and that the new system will provide alerts "specific to the threat" and that "they will have a specified end date."

== Description ==
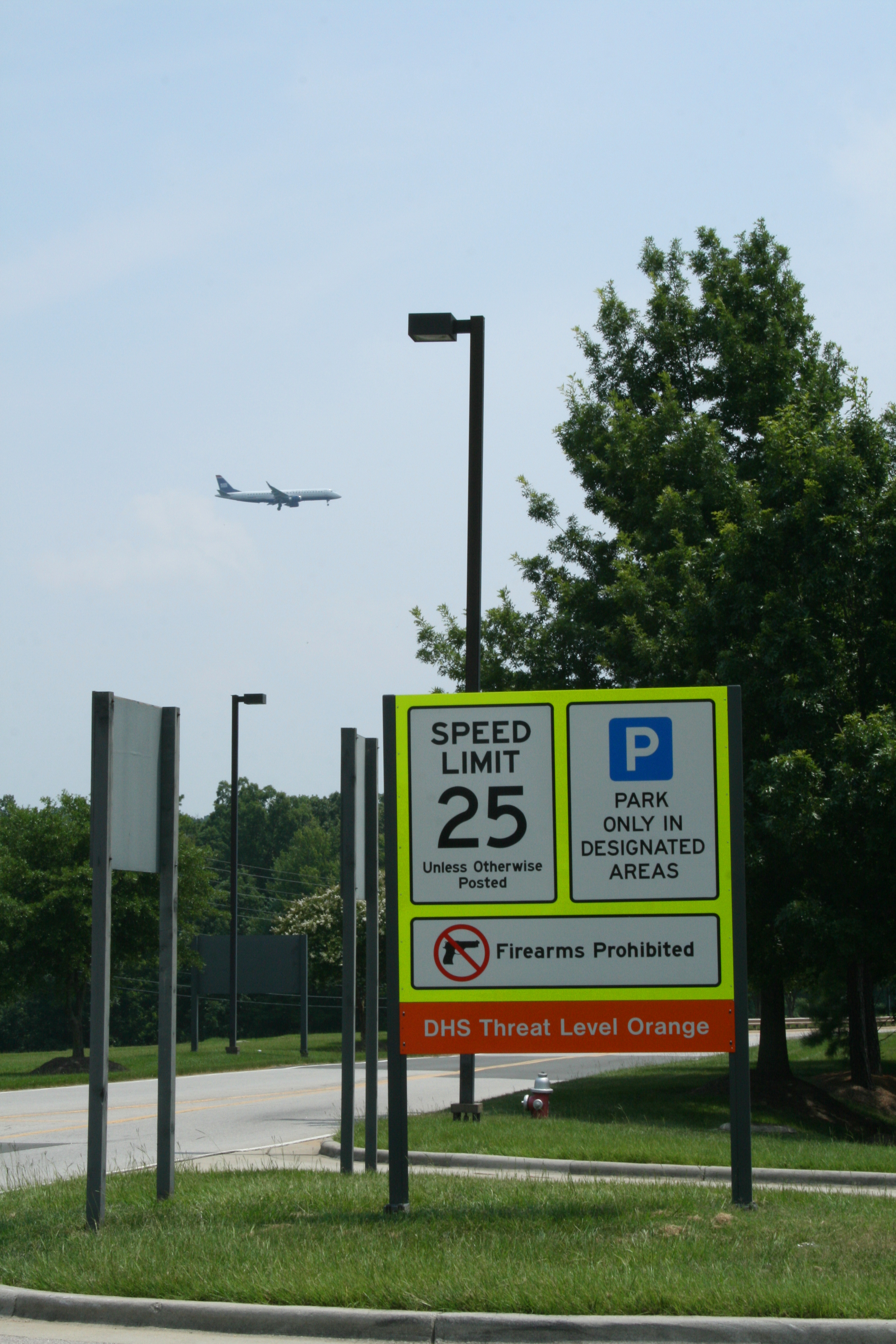
Threat level Orange at Raleigh-Durham International Airport (July 2008)

Inspired by the success of the forest fire color system, the scale consists of five color-coded threat levels, which were intended to reflect the probability of a terrorist attack and its potential gravity.

Severe (red)	severe risk
High (orange)	high risk
Elevated (yellow)	significant risk
Guarded (blue)	general risk
Low (green)	low risk

The specific government actions triggered by different threat levels were not always revealed to the public, although the government had provided general guidance for civilians and federal agencies. Actions previously included increasing police and other security presence at landmarks and other high-profile targets, a closer monitoring of international borders and other points of entry, ensuring that emergency response personnel were ready, and, in some cases, deployment of members of the National Guard and State Guard were sent to assist local law enforcement on security details.

Some of the actions taken as a result of the threat levels have been challenged as being illegal under the U.S. Constitution's Fourth Amendment. For example, in November 2002, the city of Columbus, Georgia, forced all people wishing to protest at the School of the Americas to first submit to a metal detector search. The advocacy group School of the Americas Watch asked a federal trial court to enjoin the mass searches, but the court refused and simply dismissed the complaint. When the protestors appealed, the city justified the metal detector searches in part because of the "yellow" threat level. However, the U.S. Court of Appeals for the Eleventh Circuit found that this was merely a post hoc justification for the searches, because the city had not even mentioned the terror alert system in its arguments at the trial court level. Even if the city did in fact rely on the alert system at the time it acted, said the court,

We ... reject the notion that the Department of Homeland Security's threat advisory level somehow justifies these searches. Although the threat level was "elevated" at the time of the protest, "[t]o date, the threat level has stood at yellow (elevated) for the majority of its time in existence. It has been raised to orange (high) six times." Given that we have been on "yellow alert" for over two and a half years now, we cannot consider this a particularly exceptional condition that warrants curtailment of constitutional rights. We cannot simply suspend or restrict civil liberties until the war on terror is over, because the War on Terror is unlikely ever to be truly over. September 11, 2001, already a day of immeasurable tragedy, cannot be the day liberty perished in this country. Furthermore, a system that gave the federal government the power to determine the range of constitutionally permissible searches simply by raising or lowering the nation's threat advisory system would allow the restrictions of the Fourth Amendment to be circumvented too easily. Consequently, the "elevated" alert status does not aid the City's case.

Bourgeois v. Peters, 387 F.3d 1303, 1312 (11th Cir. 2004) Incidentally, this was also the first time that Wikipedia was quoted in a published decision of a federal appeals court.

The published terror alert notices urged American citizens, especially those traveling in the transportation systems, to "be vigilant, take notice of their surroundings, and report suspicious items or activities to local authorities immediately." In addition, DHS advised the public to prepare an emergency preparedness kit and a family emergency plan.

== Criticism of the system ==
=== Objective criteria ===
There were no published criteria for the threat levels, and thus no independent way to tell whether the current threat level was accurate. The threat levels Green (low risk) and Blue (general risk) were never used. The evidence cited to justify changes in threat levels had been stated vaguely (see below) and its sources were seldom revealed. Supporters of the system defended this by stating that providing detailed, current intelligence about terror organizations would endanger the ability to gather similar information in the future.

Some critics worried that the absence of clearly defined, objective criteria had allowed the baseline threat level to be established as elevated (yellow), thus precluding the system from ever dropping down to low (green) or general (blue). That limited the communicative value and options of the system to the three highest values. As persons become habituated to the threat level being perpetually elevated, they were increasingly likely to pay less attention to warnings issued.

=== Political manipulation ===
The lack of disclosure made the system vulnerable to manipulation by government officials. These attributes had been criticized by cartoonists, journalists, entertainers, and security experts.

The alert level was raised once in 2004, an election year, leading some critics to speculate that the Bush administration used them for political rather than strictly security reasons. In 2009, Ridge alleged in his book The Test of Our Times: America Under Siege ... and How We Can Be Safe Again that top aides to President Bush (including defense secretary Donald Rumsfeld and attorney general John Ashcroft) pressured him to raise the alert level on the eve of the November 2004 presidential election. Ridge refused. "After that episode, I knew I had to follow through with my plans to leave the federal government for the private sector," he said.

In December 2004, the Homeland Security Advisory Council voted to review the color-coded system. One panel member suggested that it had outlived its usefulness. In a public forum, Ridge conceded the system had invited "questions and even occasional derision." Ridge also said that he had not always agreed when others pushed to raise the threat level. "Sometimes we disagreed with the intelligence assessment," Ridge said. "Sometimes we thought even if the intelligence was good, you don't necessarily put the country on [alert]. ... There were times when some people were really aggressive about raising it, and we said, 'For that?'"

On its terror alert page, DHS made clear that "Raising the threat condition has economic, physical, and psychological effects on the nation." A study published in the January 2009 issue of the American Journal of Public Health found that the mentally ill, the disabled, African Americans, Latinos, Chinese Americans, Korean Americans, and non-U.S. citizens were likelier to think that the HSAS alert level was higher than it was, and to worry more and change their behavior due to those fears.

=== Finding of flawed and bloated target list ===
The inspector general of the Department of Homeland Security (DHS) found that the list of terrorist target sites contained in the DHS "National Asset Database", the sites that are supposed to receive extra security in response to heightened terror alerts, included many sites “whose criticality is not readily apparent” and should not be included on the list. For example, the list included a beach at the end of a street, a popcorn factory, a doughnut shop, and a petting zoo. By July 2006, the list included 77,069 target sites. The inspector general's report found other wild discrepancies, for example, that the State of Indiana had 8,591 potential terrorist targets, 50% more targets than New York State with 5,687 targets, and more than twice as many as the State of California, which had only 3,212, even though New York and California are larger than Indiana and include more prominent American landmarks. DHS officials denied that there was anything wrong with the list.

=== Task force ===
A September 2009 report from the HSAS Task Force found that the "current system had functioned reasonably well" for institutional audiences, but that the "system's ability to communicate useful information in a credible manner to the public is poor", and that "there is a disturbing lack of confidence in the system." The task force recommended that future threats be more narrowly targeted by "specific region and sector under threat", rather than "elevating the alert status of the nation as a whole", and that the number of levels be reduced from five to three to acknowledge that "the new baseline for the United States is guarded." The task force was divided on whether to recommend abandonment of color-coding in the system, but asserted that if such a coding remains in use, "substantial reform is required."

== Threat level changes ==
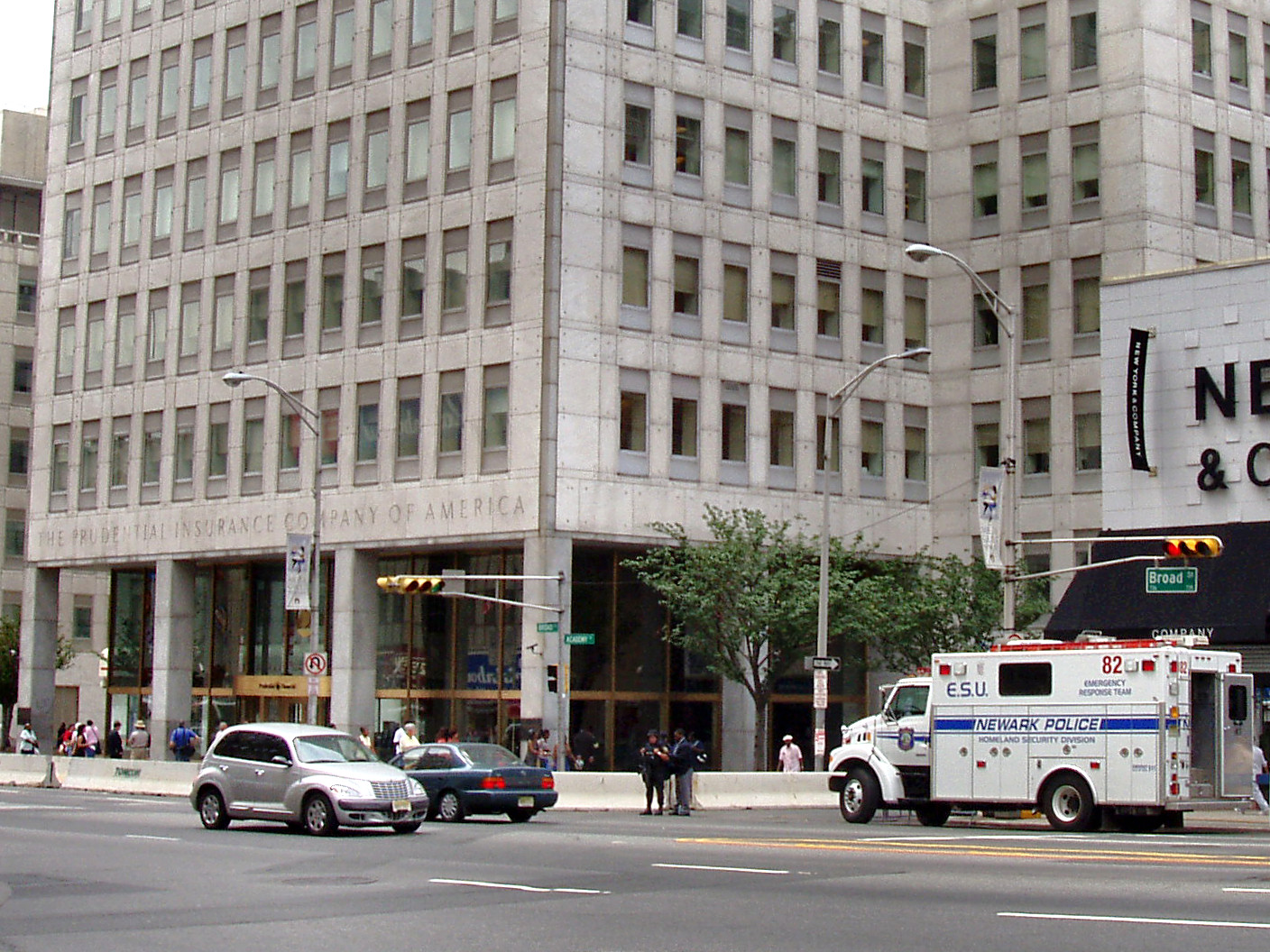
Homeland Security secured the Prudential Financial Building in Newark, New Jersey in August 2004 following the discovery of evidence of a terrorist threat to it.

The HSAS threat level changed 17 times as of September 2009. In August 2004, DHS began identifying specific sectors under possible threat, including aviation, financial services, and mass transit.

=== Severe (Red) ===
The threat level was raised to Severe only once, which applied only to flights coming from the United Kingdom:

- August 10–September 14, 2006, in response to British law enforcement announcing it had disrupted a major terror plot to blow up aircraft, DHS raised the threat level for commercial flights from the United Kingdom to the United States to Severe. The alert was extended into mid-September 2006 to coincide with the 5th Anniversary of the September 11 Attacks. Other noticeable recent attacks are the targeting of U.S. military and Frankfurt Airport.

=== High (Orange) ===
New York City's threat level was High from the system's introduction. On a nationwide level, it was raised to High five times:

- September 10–24, 2002, the first anniversary of the September 11, 2001 attacks.
- February 7–27, 2003, near the end of the Muslim religious holiday Hajj. Intelligence reports suggested the possibility of terrorist attacks against "apartment buildings, hotels, and other soft or lightly secured targets."
- March 17 – April 16, 2003, around the beginning of U.S. and Coalition military action in Iraq.
- May 20–30, 2003, after the Riyadh compound bombings and the Casablanca bombings. According to Tom Ridge: "The U.S. Intelligence Community believes that Al Qaeda has entered an operational period worldwide, and this may include terrorist attacks in the United States."
- December 21, 2003 – January 9, 2004, citing intelligence information suggesting large-scale attacks around the holiday season. Since New York City's level was already at High, NYPD commissioner Ray Kelly characterized this increased threat level as "Orange Plus".

In addition, the alert was raised to High on a select or partial basis three times:

- August 1 – November 10, 2004, for specific financial institutions in northern New Jersey, New York, and Washington, D.C., citing intelligence pointing to the possibility of a car or truck bomb attack, naming specific buildings as possible targets.
- July 7, 2005 – August 12, 2005, for mass transit systems only. The DHS secretary announced the level after the 7 July 2005 London bombings despite the absence of "specific, credible information suggesting imminent attack" in the United States.
- August 10, 2006 – April 27, 2011, for all domestic and international flights to or from the United States, with the exception of flights from the United Kingdom to the United States, which had been under a Severe alert due to the 2006 transatlantic aircraft plot, but were downgraded to High on August 13, 2006.

=== Elevated (Yellow) ===
- March 12 – September 10, 2002
- September 25, 2002 – February 6, 2003
- February 28 – March 16, 2003
- April 17 – May 20, 2003
- May 31, 2003 – August 1, 2004
- November 10, 2004 – July 8, 2005
- August 12, 2005 – April 27, 2011 (Replaced by the National Terrorism Advisory System, but excludes domestic and international flights)

=== Guarded (Blue) and Low (Green) ===
The threat level was never lowered to Low (Green) or Guarded (Blue). It was recommended in a September 2009 Task Force report to remove the Low and Guarded conditions from the Alert System altogether and set Yellow (Elevated) to "Guarded" as the new baseline of the system, without changing the baseline conditions issued when under Yellow in the current system.

=== Other terror warnings ===
Other official terrorism warnings issued without raising the threat level above Elevated:

- July 11, 2007, reports that al-Qaeda has rebuilt operating capability, strength to level not seen before the September 11 attacks; strongest since summer of 2001.
- July 12, 2007, reports that al-Qaeda is stepping up efforts to sneak terrorists into the United States and has rebuilt capability to strike there.

== See also ==
- National Terrorism Advisory System (current U.S. system)
- BIKINI state (United Kingdom)
- UK Threat Levels (United Kingdom)
- DEFCON
- MARSEC
- Vigipirate (France)
