= Preparing for Emergencies =

2004 UK public information campaign

The logo of Preparing for Emergencies

Preparing for Emergencies was a public information campaign produced by the Home Office, a department of the United Kingdom Government. It advised British citizens on what to do in the event of a natural disaster, accident or terrorism. The campaign began on 26 July 2004 in the wake of several major disasters, such as the 11 March 2004 Madrid train bombings, SARS, and the 2001 UK foot and mouth crisis. The campaign was in the form of a 22-page booklet which covered topics such as transport accidents, health, foot and mouth disease, terrorism, and fire safety.

The booklet was distributed to all UK households but received some criticism – comparing it to Protect and Survive, a 1980s series of public information films and a booklet that instructed people on how to remain safe from nuclear war. Some sections of the media also accused the government of "scaremongering".

Within a day of the website accompanying the booklet being launched, a parody website under the URL preparingforemergencies.co.uk was created by Tom Scott, then a linguistics student at the University of York and web developer, who would later document its creation on his YouTube channel in 2018. Presented as being from the fictional "Department of Vague Paranoia", it parodied the seemingly obvious advice given by the booklets, and gave advice such as: "Alien Invasion: Negotiate using sign language, if possible. Failing that, and assuming they aren't armed with futuristic ray guns, run like hell". The Home Office initially objected to the website, stating that the URL was too similar to that of their own website, preparingforemergencies.gov.uk, and demanded the website be taken down. However, after a link to the official website was added, the Home Office conceded the issue, and allowed the site to remain online.

Following the original distribution, no more booklets have been produced, although the website was updated with advice on possible bird flu epidemics and the 7 July 2005 London bombings.

In 2011–2012 the website was permanently closed, and official emergency preparedness information for the UK was moved to the gov.uk website.

== Logo ==
The components of the logo are used to indicate resources or actions to follow during an emergency. From left to right, they are:

- "i" on blue background - Information
- "999" on purple background - What to do in an emergency (Emergency Services)
- Right arrow on green background - Go in
- Lock on red background - Stay in
- Dash on yellow background - Tune in (to local radio or television)
- Plus on turquoise background - Administer first aid

The logo was still used by local government organizations giving information on civil defence a decade or more later. The development of the logo cost £17,000 in 2004.

== See also ==
- Protect and Survive, 1974 UK campaign
- United States Department of Homeland Security § Ready.gov, a similar campaign in the United States.
