= COGCON =

United States government readiness level

COGCON ("continuity of government readiness condition") is a United States government readiness level, roughly analogous to the DEFCON alert state system, tracking the readiness of the government in the event of an emergency.

For example, the Raven Rock Mountain Complex, otherwise known as Site R, will act as an alternative military command centre in the event that other primary command posts are taken offline during an emergency.

== History ==
The system was introduced in National Security Presidential Directive 51, signed by George W. Bush on May 4, 2007, and can also be found in the 102 page national continuity plan. In the event of a catastrophic national emergency, a shadow government can be activated to facilitate the execution of essential state functions with the assistance of the emergency relocation groups assigned to each federal agency and to a specific secure location to be activated as the COGCON level increases.

== Levels ==
- COGCON 4 represents normal peacetime operations.
- COGCON 3 is a state of heightened readiness, with some government officials required to notify a Watch Office as to their location. During the U.S. State of the Union address, the COGCON is raised to this level and a cabinet member is the "Designated Survivor."
- COGCON 2 calls for deployment to a relocation facility with four hours notice.
- COGCON 1 calls for the United States government to be relocated to secure, fully staffed bunkers such as the Mount Weather Emergency Operations Center.
