= REDCON =

U.S. military readiness condition

In the U.S. military, the term REDCON is short for Readiness Condition and is used to refer to a unit's readiness to respond to and engage in combat operations. There are five REDCON levels, as described below in this excerpt from Army Field Manual 71–1.

== Overview ==
- REDCON-1: Full alert; unit ready to move and fight.
  - WMD alarms and hot loop equipment stowed; OPs pulled in. (A hot loop is a field telephone circuit between the subunits of a company.)
  - All personnel alert and mounted on vehicles; weapons manned.
  - Engines started.
  - Company team is ready to move immediately.
- REDCON-1.5
  - WMD alarms and hot loop equipment stowed; OPs pulled in.
  - All personnel alert and mounted on vehicles; weapons manned.
  - Company team is ready to move immediately.
- REDCON-2: Full alert; unit ready to fight.
  - Equipment stowed (except hot loop and WMD alarms).
  - Precombat checks complete.
  - All personnel alert and mounted in vehicles; weapons manned & charged, round in chamber, weapon on safe.
  - (NOTE: Depending on the tactical situation and orders from the commander, dismounted OPs may remain in place.)
  - All (100 percent) digital and FM communications links operational.
  - Status reports submitted in accordance with task force SOP.
  - Company team is ready to move within 15 minutes of notification.
- REDCON-3: Reduced alert.
  - Fifty percent of the unit executes work and rest plans.
  - Remainder of the unit executes security plan. Based on the commander's guidance and the enemy situation, some personnel executing the security plan may execute portions of the work plan.
  - Company team is ready to move within 30 minutes of notification.
- REDCON-4: Minimum alert.
  - OPs manned; one soldier per platoon designated to monitor radio and man turret weapons.
  - Digital and FM links with task force and other company teams maintained.
  - Company team is ready to move within one hour of notification.

== See also ==
- Alert state
- DEFCON
- Force Protection Condition
- Redcon (2016 game)
