= Force protection condition =

United States counter-terrorist threat system

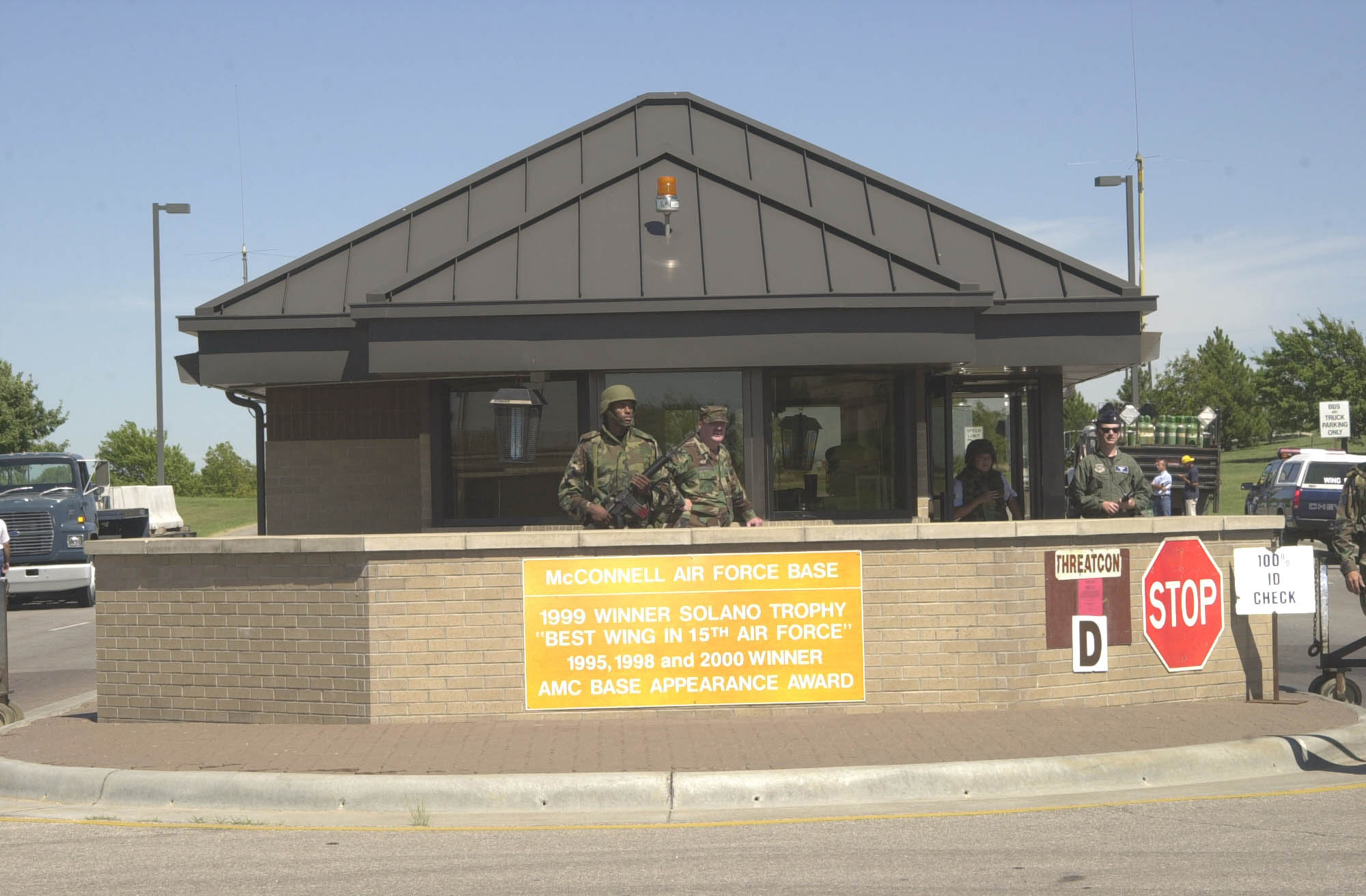
McConnell AFB entrance displaying THREATCON DELTA on the day of the 9/11 attacks.

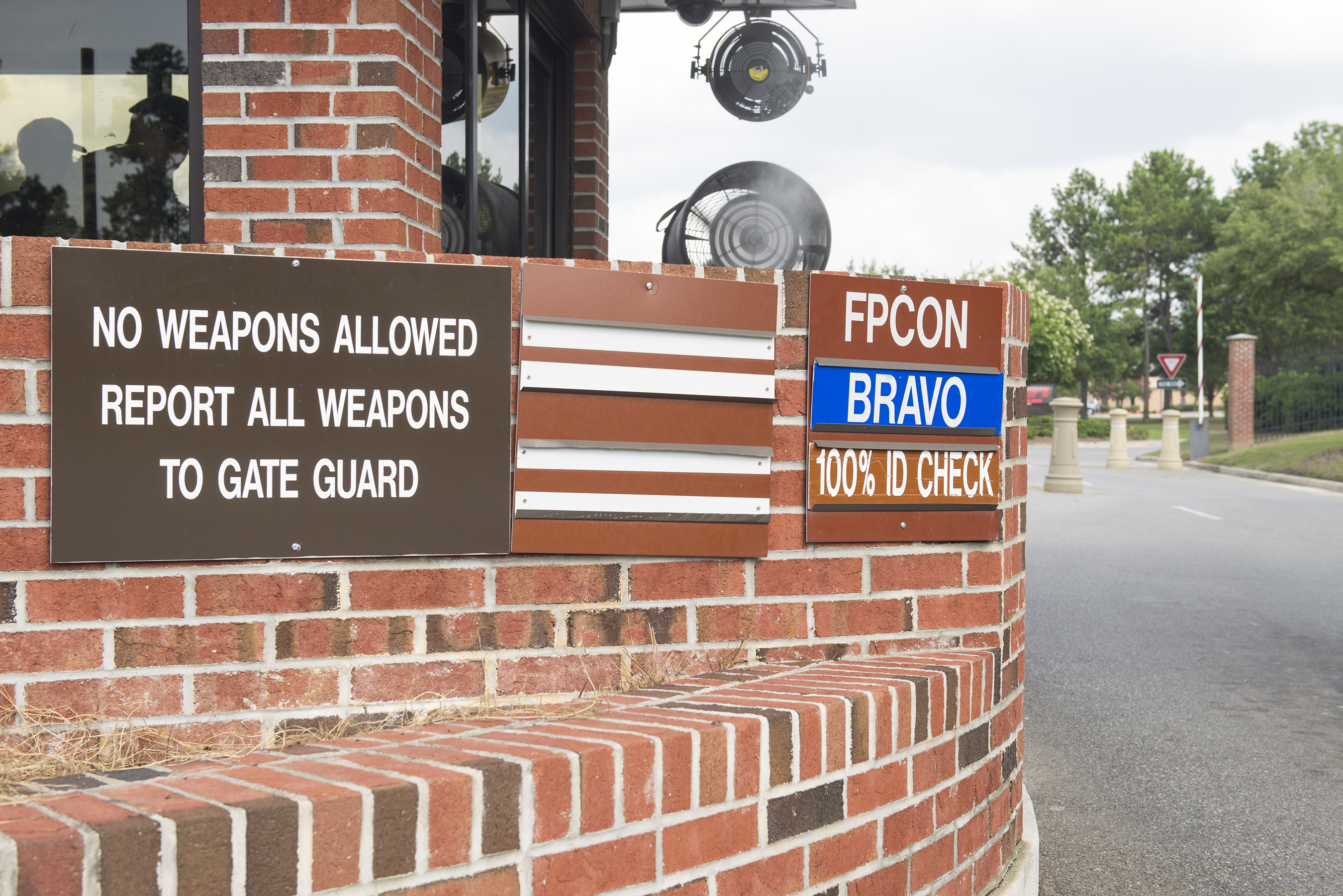
Moody AFB entrance displaying FPCON BRAVO in June 2015.

In United States military security parlance, the force protection condition (FPCON for short) is a counter-terrorist (otherwise known as antiterrorism (AT for short))^{:1} threat system employed by the United States Department of Defense. It describes the number of measures needed to be taken by security agencies in response to various levels of terrorist threats against military facilities, as opposed to DEFCON, which assesses the number of military forces needed to be deployed in a situation with a certain likelihood of an attack against the civilian population.^{:9:E2.16} The decision on what level of FPCON to implement is affected by the current threat of terrorism towards military facilities and personnel, the number of security forces available, and current relationships between the United States and the world, which may affect the chances of an attack. FPCON was previously known as THREATCON, until it was renamed in June 2001 due to confusion with the United States State Department system of threat assessment.^{:7}

== Descriptions of FPCONs ==
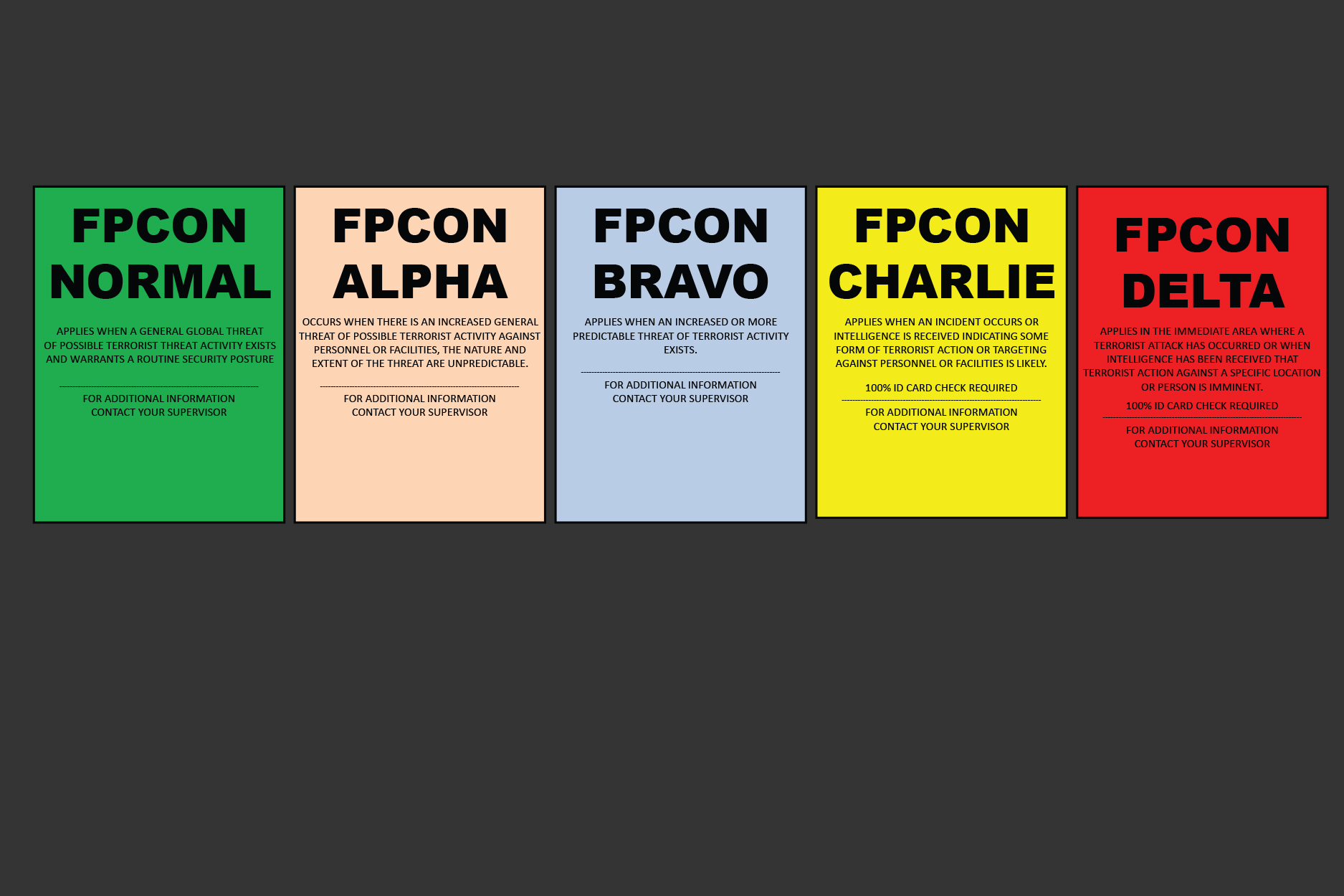
Army infographic concerning FPCON levels.

There are five Force Protection Conditions; the commander of U.S. Northern Command determines what the minimum force protection level will be for every American installation in the continental United States. They set the force protection condition level for so many installations because it is the Unified Combatant Command whose geographic area of responsibility is in North America. Other combatant commands, such as U.S. European Command and U.S. Southern Command, set the force protection condition levels for local American military installations in their areas of responsibility. Individual facility and installation commanders may increase their local force protection levels as they feel is necessary, but they must adhere to at least the minimum level prescribed by the US Northern Command. Force protection can include procedures as basic as checking identification cards at the entrance to an installation and requiring credentials to get inside a building. However, when necessary, force protection procedures can become as stringent as inspecting every vehicle, person, and bag entering an installation.

Sites may have their own FPCON levels as well as have locally specific AT measures for an FPCON, which must be classified CONFIDENTIAL; otherwise, if separated from the AT or Physical Security Plan, they can be downgraded to FOR OFFICIAL USE ONLY if deemed appropriate.^{:39:E4.3.1}

All FPCON levels will apply their subordinate's policies; ALPHA includes NORMAL's policies, BRAVO includes ALPHA and NORMAL's policies, and so on.

- FPCON NORMAL applies when a general global threat of possible terrorist activity exists and warrants a routine security posture.^{:39:E4.2.1} In NORMAL, buildings, rooms and storage areas not in regular use are to be secured and randomly inspected, as well as randomly searching vehicles and people entering bases under the jurisdiction of the United States. Entrances for vehicles and persons must be limited and controlled, when not at the deficit of traffic.^{:39:E4.4.1.1-4}
- FPCON ALPHA applies when there is an increased general threat of possible terrorist activity against personnel or facilities, and the nature and extent of the threat are unpredictable.^{:39:E4.2.2} In ALPHA, personnel and family members must be regularly informed of the possible threat at hand, and to be alert. Resources such as food and water must be under a risk management plan. Intelligence and CI dissemination procedures must be reviewed, as well as other base security plans. If necessary, local law enforcement may be contacted on the current threat and mutual AT measures.^{:39:E4.4.2.2-10}
- FPCON BRAVO applies when an increased or more predictable threat of terrorist activity exists.^{:39:E4.2.3} In BRAVO, control of entry is further enforced, where particularly large vehicles (such as delivery vans or trucks) must be inspected for any large concealed IED. Vehicles and miscellaneous objects (such as crates, or trash bins) must be kept a reasonable distance away from buildings to reduce the possible vulnerability to bomb attacks. Mail heading through the base must be inspected for any suspicious deliveries, as well as daily interior and exterior building inspections at the start and end of workdays.^{:39:E4.4.3.2-6}
- FPCON CHARLIE applies when an incident occurs or intelligence is received indicating some form of terrorist action or targeting against personnel or facilities is likely.^{:39:E4.2.4} In CHARLIE, additional required personnel will be recalled, and personnel entering distribution centers for personal needs must have their identities verified. Entrance and departure from the base must be logged, and personal items may be limited or inspected. Contingency monitoring for CBRN must be initiated, and non-DoD personnel should be disconnected from base water supplies (in the case of contractor-operated supplies, a local alternative should be implemented). Local roads may be closed, and flight should be limited to only those essential for operation.^{:39:E4.4.4.2-15}
- FPCON DELTA applies to the immediate area where a terrorist attack has occurred or when intelligence has been received that terrorist action against a specific location or person is imminent.^{:39:E4.2.5} In DELTA, all vehicles and personnel must be completely, positively identified, with no exceptions. DoD schools are to be closed, and movement that is not essential must be restricted. Flights on base are to be grounded or redirected, except for those specifically authorized. Municipal and military roads may be closed if permitted, and continuous CBRN monitoring is to take place.^{:39:E4.4.5.2-13} Most DELTA conditions are localized and shouldn't be used for a prolonged amount of time for mission and personnel sake; an example of a generally applied FPCON DELTA condition was during the September 11 attacks.

The key significant difference between FPCON DELTA and other, more general FPCONs, is that DELTA will reference a specific, known threat, whereas others are used for preparing for imminent or possible threats of a non-targeted nature. Other FPCONs can also be maintained for a significant length of time, possibly lasting for several weeks, while DELTA is generally only maintainable for several days. An FPCON level may also be designated as "+", meaning the facility shall institute extra security measures beyond those specified for the FPCON level. Generally, this is used to provide an extra layer of security for FPCON ALPHA. There is a list of extra security measures that may be initiated for a "+" security level; normally the facility Force Protection NCO will choose two or three for their installation, and switch them out randomly to prevent a predictable response. Some, however, are nearly always used. For instance, 100% ID checks of all incoming persons are almost always used at FPCON ALPHA+, while armed fence line patrols may be done for two days, then stopped and replaced with anti-surveillance measures to increase randomness and decrease the predictability of defense. FPCON levels can also be raised in a non-progressive manner; for example, the FPCON level can jump from FPCON NORMAL to CHARLIE, completely skipping the ALPHA and BRAVO levels.

== Popular culture ==
In the 2019 science fiction movie Terminator: Dark Fate, Major Dean declares THREATCON DELTA when his group is attacked by a Model Rev-9 Terminator flying a helicopter.

In the 2009 science fiction movie Transformers: Revenge of the Fallen, the U.S. military assumes THREATCON DELTA when they believe that the arrival of multiple Decepticons to Earth is a string of massive terrorist attacks around the world.

In the 2011 science fiction movie Battle: Los Angeles, the U.S. Marines use the term THREATCON DELTA when they discover that the "meteors" are actually alien ships.

In a 2003 episode of the political drama The West Wing, "Red Haven's on Fire," President Bartlet orders military bases in Africa and Europe to go to THREATCON CHARLIE after a suicide bombing.

In a 2003 episode of the legal drama JAG, "Empty Quiver," a U.S. Navy base is shown to be on THREATCON DELTA after a nuclear warhead goes missing.

== See also ==
- Information Operations Condition
- Force protection
- DEFCON
- REDCON
