= National Terrorism Advisory System =

Terrorism alert warning system

NTAS bulletin issued in November 2016

The National Terrorism Advisory System (NTAS) is a terrorism threat advisory scale used by the United States Department of Homeland Security (DHS) since April 26, 2011.

The NTAS is the replacement for the often-criticized, color-coded Homeland Security Advisory System introduced by the George W. Bush administration in 2002. Janet Napolitano said that the color-coded system often presented "little practical information" to the public and that the NTAS will provide alerts "specific to the threat" with "a specified end date."

On December 16, 2015, secretary Jeh Johnson activated the bulletin capability for the first time.

The DHS added an intermediate threat level in 2015, after the department identified a "new phase" in the global terrorist threat against the homeland.

== Background ==
The Homeland Security Advisory System was created in response to the 9/11 attacks by the George W. Bush administration. After its announcement, Peter T. King, a Republican representative from New York, said that the color-based assessments were useful at the time of their creation but that a more specific system was now needed. The five-level color system has been criticized as being vague and ineffective, and alert levels have rarely changed from the yellow ("elevated") and orange ("high") levels.

The color-coded Homeland Security Advisory System is the predecessor to the NTAS.

Mississippi Democratic representative Bennie Thompson said that the color codes were often better at causing "Americans to be scared" rather than at telling citizens "the reason, how to proceed, or for how long to be on alert." The color-coded system has also been ridiculed by television comedians and shows such as Saturday Night Live.

In July 2009, Napolitano created a task force to reassess the scale and concluded that the Homeland Security Advisory System was unclear and lacked public support, and the task force recommended discontinuing the scale. In November 2010, the Department of Homeland Security submitted a draft plan to overhaul the color system and create what one official called "a system that communicates precise, actionable information based on the latest intelligence."

== Launch ==
The system was announced on January 27, 2011, by secretary Napolitano, during a speech at George Washington University. Her official announcement followed reports about the NTAS that had surfaced the day before.

Introducing the NTAS, Napolitano said, "Today I announce the end of the old system of color-coded alerts. In its place, we will implement a new system that's built on a clear and simple premise: When a threat develops that could impact you—the public—we will tell you. We will provide whatever information we can so you know how to protect yourselves, your families, and your communities." Her speech was timed to complement president Barack Obama's 2011 State of the Union Address, two days earlier.

== Modifications ==
In 2011, the DHS added bulletins to the NTAS to distribute information about trends and non-specific threats.

On December 7, 2015, a day after an Address to the Nation by the president from the Oval Office, a plan to add a new "intermediate" threat level to the NTAS was announced by secretary Johnson to reflect a "new phase" in the global terrorist threat against the homeland following the November 2015 Paris attacks and the 2015 San Bernardino attack.

Secretary Johnson stated that the level understood as a normal alert level would have been considered a higher level years ago, but because of the continual threat, a high threat level is now considered as the "baseline."

== Description ==
Alerts are issued under the categories of "elevated," "intermediate," or "imminent." According to Napolitano, "When [the Department of Homeland Security has] information about a specific, credible threat, [it] will issue a formal alert providing as much information as [it] can." When an alert is provided to the public it includes the following information if available: geographic region, mode of transportation, critical infrastructure potentially affected by the threat, protective actions authorities are taking, and steps individuals or communities should be taking to protect themselves and families. That includes providing government agencies and emergency officials with threat assessments as well as using news outlets and social networking resources to notify the public.

It also outlines steps to take in response to a particular terrorist threat. Individual threat alerts are issued for a specific amount of time, and the threat alert then automatically expires.

If new information becomes available, the threat alert may be extended. Information on whether the threat has been extended or is expiring is distributed to the public in the same way that the original notification was made.

== See also ==
- Terror alert
